= Tiger shark (disambiguation) =

The tiger shark, Galeocerdo cuvier, is a large fish in the family Carcharhinidae.

Tiger shark, Tiger Shark and Tigershark may also refer to:

== Arts and entertainment ==
- Tiger Shark (film), a 1932 pre-code film
- Tigershark (film), a 1987 action film
- TigerShark, a 1997 video game
- TigerSharks, a 1980s animated children's TV series
- Tiger Shark (DC Comics), several fictional characters
- Tiger Shark (Marvel Comics), a fictional character
- USS Tiger Shark (disambiguation), the name of several fictional submarines

== Other uses ==
- Tigershark PWC, a personal watercraft manufacturer
- Kozo Urita, or Tiger Shark, a Japanese professional wrestler
- NASC TigerShark XP, an unmanned aerial vehicle
- No. 222 Squadron IAF, whose nickname is Tigersharks
- Northrop F-20 Tigershark, an American fighter aircraft
- Tallahassee Tiger Sharks, an ice hockey team
- "Tigershark," a moniker for Chrysler's second-generation World Gasoline Engine
- 911 Tiger Shark, a 1985 video game for the Commodore 64

== See also ==
- Sand tiger shark, Carcharias taurus
  - Mediterranean sand tiger shark Carcharias taurus europaeus
- Smalltooth sand tiger shark, Odontaspis ferox
