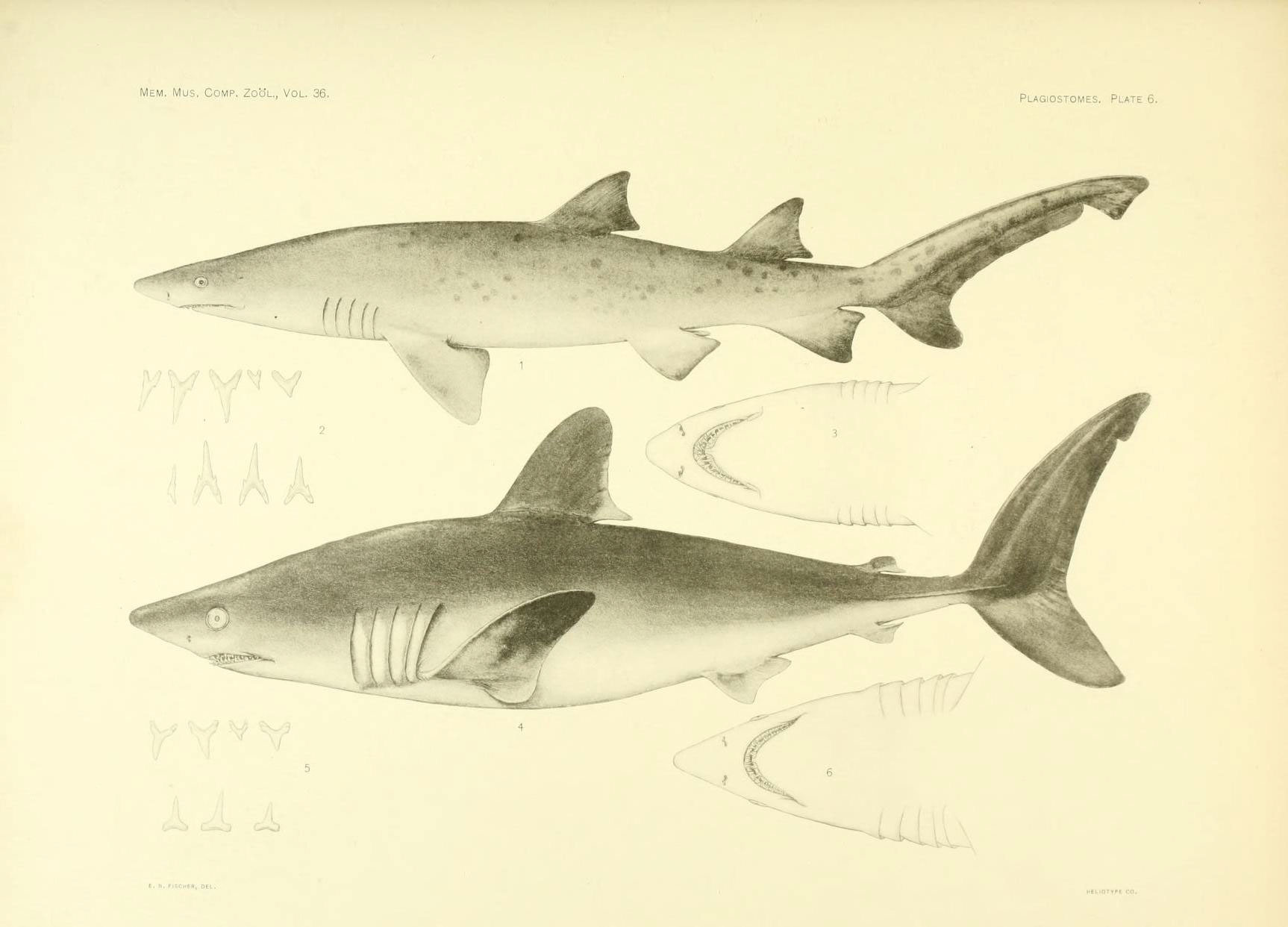
- An illustration of a sand tiger shark (top)

Conservation status
- Critically endangered, possibly extinct (IUCN 3.1)

Scientific classification
- Kingdom: Animalia
- Phylum: Chordata
- Class: Chondrichthyes
- Subclass: Elasmobranchii
- Division: Selachii
- Order: Lamniformes
- Family: Carchariidae
- Genus: Carcharias
- Species: C. taurus
- Subspecies: C. t. europaeus

Trinomial name
- Carcharias taurus europaeus

= Mediterranean sand tiger shark =

Population of shark

The Mediterranean sand tiger shark (Carcharias taurus europaeus), was a population of sand tiger shark that inhabited the Mediterranean Sea.

Over a period of 200 years, 31 occurrence records and 54 publications provided information on the presence of the species in the area. These records were sparse but systematic over time and indicated occurrence hot spots in the southwestern Mediterranean Sea and in the eastern Adriatic Sea. Additionally, 18 juveniles were recorded.

With a population estimated to be less than 200 individuals in the year 2001 combined with the declining population and extremely low birth rate this shark population is presumed extinct. The nearly 50 sightings are difficult to confirm as to whether they were of the sand tiger shark, or if they were misidentifications of the related smalltooth sand tiger shark (Odontaspis ferox). The last confirmed record from the Mediterranean Sea was a specimen caught in 2003. Having not been seen in almost two decades, the species is presumed extinct.

The genetics of the already endangered species as a whole are poorly studied, however during a recent effort results suggested a genetic relationship between Mediterranean sand tiger sharks and those from the Western Indian Ocean (Carcharias taurus tricuspidatus). It is hypothesized that during the Pleistocene the cold Benguela upwelling barrier was temporarily reduced allowing the passage of C. taurus individuals from the Indian to Atlantic Ocean. Some individuals were trapped in the Atlantic Ocean and probably migrated northward colonizing the Western African coasts and the Mediterranean Sea.
