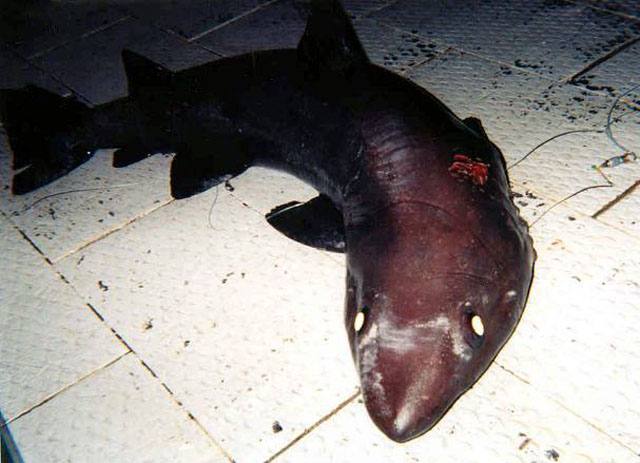

Conservation status
- Least Concern (IUCN 3.1)

Scientific classification
- Kingdom: Animalia
- Phylum: Chordata
- Class: Chondrichthyes
- Subclass: Elasmobranchii
- Division: Selachii
- Order: Lamniformes
- Family: Odontaspididae
- Genus: Odontaspis
- Species: O. noronhai

Binomial name
- Odontaspis noronhai (Maul, 1955)
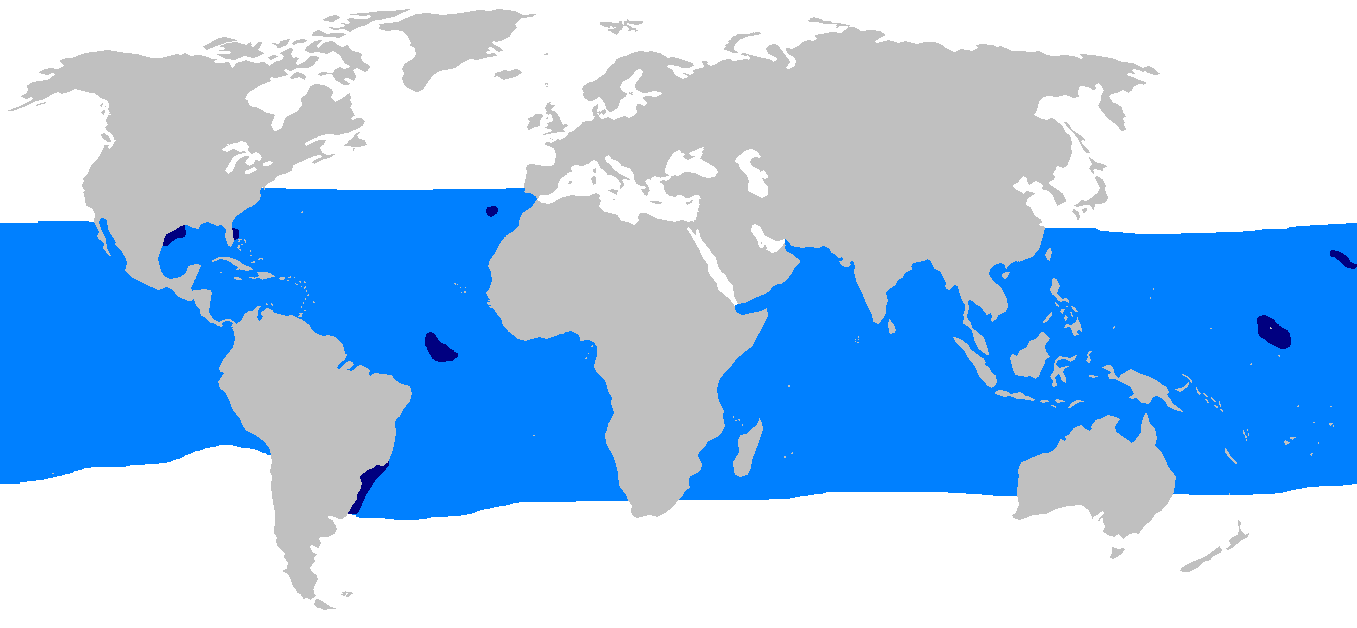
- Confirmed (dark blue) and suspected (light blue) range of the bigeye sand tiger

Synonyms
- Carcharias noronhai Maul, 1955

= Bigeye sand tiger =

Species of shark

The bigeye sand tiger (Odontaspis noronhai) is an extremely rare species of mackerel shark in the family Odontaspididae, with a possible worldwide distribution. A large, bulky species reaching at least 3.6 m (12 ft) in length, the bigeye sand tiger has a long bulbous snout, large orange eyes without nictitating membranes, and a capacious mouth with the narrow teeth prominently exposed. It can be distinguished from the similar smalltooth sand tiger (O. ferox) by its teeth, which have only one lateral cusplet on each side, and by its uniformly dark brown color.

Inhabiting continental margins and oceanic waters at depths of 60–1,000 m (200–3,280 ft), the bigeye sand tiger may make vertical and horizontal migratory movements. It feeds on bony fishes and squid, and its sizable eyes and dark coloration suggest that it may spend most of its time in the mesopelagic zone. Reproduction is probably viviparous with oophagous embryos like in other mackerel shark species. This shark is caught incidentally by commercial fisheries, though so infrequently.

== Taxonomy and phylogeny ==
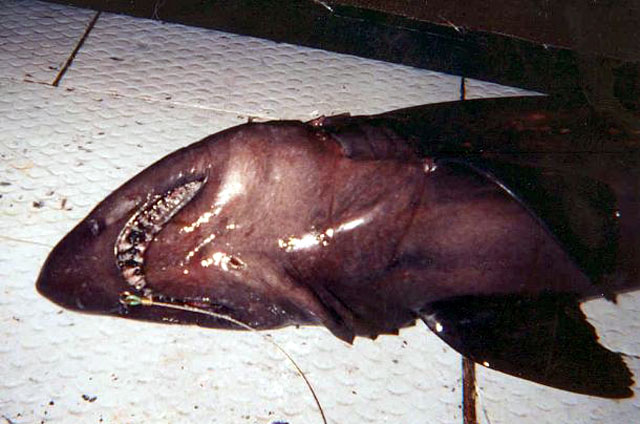
Head

The first known bigeye sand tiger was a female 1.7 m (5.6 ft) long caught off Madeira in April 1941, on a longline set for black scabbardfish (Aphanopus carbo). The specimen was mounted and later formed the basis for a scientific description authored by German ichthyologist Günther Maul in a 1955 article for Notulae Naturae. He named the species noronhai in honor of Adolfo César de Noronha, the late Director of the Funchal Museum. Maul assigned his new species to the genus Carcharias, which at the time was used for all members of the sand tiger shark family. When the Odontaspis came to be recognized as a valid genus separate from Carcharias, the bigeye sand tiger was reassigned as well given its resemblance to the smalltooth sand tiger (O. ferox). Until more specimens were examined in the 1980s, some authors speculated that this species represented an extreme variant of the smalltooth sand tiger. Other names for this shark include black sand tiger, oceanic sand tiger, and bigeye ragged-tooth shark.

Whether the bigeye and smalltooth sand tigers belong in the same family as the superficially similar sand tiger shark (C. taurus) has been debated among systematists, with morphological and dentitional studies giving inconsistent results. A 2012 molecular phylogenetic analysis, based on mitochondrial DNA, supported a sister species relationship between O. noronhai and O. ferox but not a clade consisting of Odontaspis and Carcharias. Instead, Odontaspis was found to be closer to the crocodile shark (Pseudocarcharias kamoharai), suggesting that it and Carcharias should be placed in separate families.

== Description ==
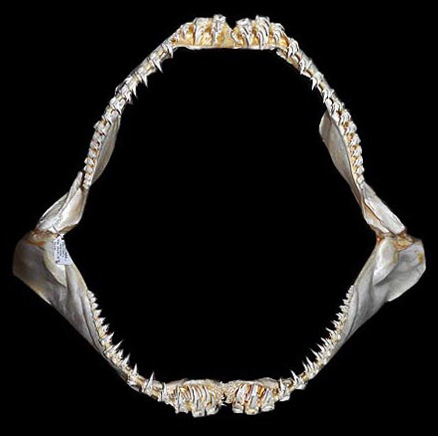
The teeth differ in shape in the bigeye sand tiger and in other, similar species.

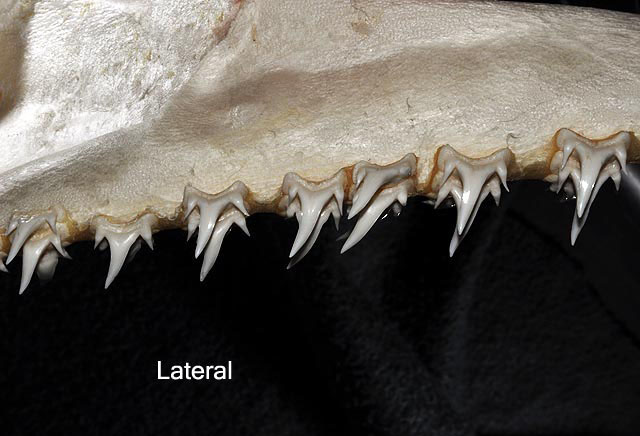
Lateral teeth

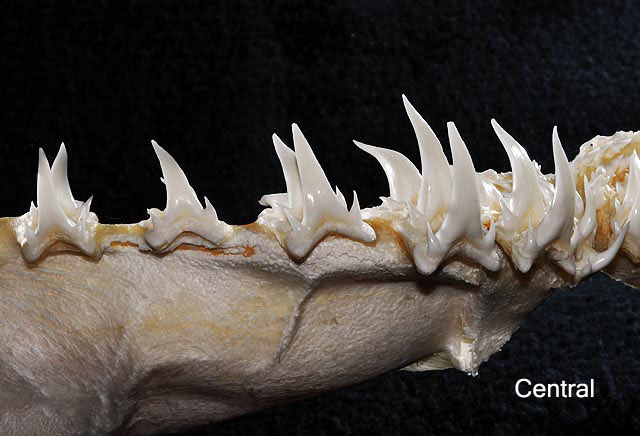
Central teeth

With its heavyset body, conical bulbous snout, and large mouth filled with protruding teeth, the bigeye sand tiger looks much like the better-known sand tiger shark. The large eyes lack nictitating membranes, and behind them are small spiracles. The corner of the mouth extends to behind the level of the eyes, and the jaws are highly protrusible. There are 34–43 upper and 37–46 lower tooth rows; these include zero to two rows of small teeth at the upper symphysis (jaw midpoint) and two to four more rows at the lower symphysis. In each half of the upper jaw, the teeth in the first and second rows are large, those in the third and sometimes fourth rows are small, and those in the rows after are large again. Each tooth has a narrow, awl-like central cusp flanked by one smaller cusplet on each side; this contrasts with the smalltooth sand tiger, which has two or three lateral cusplets on each side. There are five pairs of gill slits.

The pectoral fins are medium-sized and broad with rounded tips. The large first dorsal fin has a rounded apex and is positioned closer to the pectoral than the pelvic fins. The second dorsal fin is about half the size of the first and originates over the rear tips of the pelvic fins. The pelvic fins are almost as large as the first dorsal fin. The anal fin is smaller than the second dorsal fin and positioned behind it. The caudal peduncle has a crescent-shaped notch at the dorsal origin of the caudal fin. The lower lobe of the caudal fin is short but distinct, while the upper lobe is long and has a deep notch in the trailing margin near the tip. The skin is covered by overlapping dermal denticles, each with three horizontal ridges leading to marginal teeth. This species is plain dark reddish brown to chocolate brown, sometimes with black trailing margins on the fins or a white-tipped first dorsal fin. The eyes are dark orange with vertically oval, green-tinted pupils. There are several black patches inside the mouth, such as around the jaws, on the floor of the mouth, and on the gill arches. The largest male and female specimens measured 3.6 and 3.3 m (12 and 11 ft) long respectively.

== Distribution and habitat ==
Though extremely rare, the bigeye sand tiger has been reported from scattered locations around the world, suggesting a wide and possibly disjunct global distribution in tropical and warm-temperate oceanic waters. Most known specimens have come from the Atlantic, where it has been found off Madeira, southern Brazil, Texas, eastern Florida, and the Mid-Atlantic Ridge. The only evidence for its presence in the Indian Ocean is a set of jaws that may have originated from the Seychelles, though the South China Sea is another possibility. The existence of this species in the Pacific Ocean was first suspected in 1970 from teeth recovered from bottom sediments, which was confirmed over a decade later by captures from the Marshall Islands and Hawaii.

The bigeye sand tiger has been caught between the depths of 60 and 1,000 m (200 and 3,280 ft). Some were recorded over continental and insular shelves, both from near the sea floor and in mid-water. Others were fished from parts of the open ocean that were 4.5–5.3 km (2.8–3.3 mi) deep, where they were swimming in the upper levels of the water column. Nighttime captures from relatively shallow depths suggest that this species may make a diel vertical migration, rising from the mesopelagic zone to the epipelagic zone at night to feed. In Brazilian waters, bigeye sand tigers are only captured in spring, hinting at some type of seasonal migratory movement.

== Biology and ecology ==
One account of a bigeye sand tiger that had been caught alive noted that it behaved very aggressively, thrashing and snapping violently in and out of the water. Its large eyes and uniformly dark coloration are characteristic traits of a mesopelagic fish. The bigeye sand tiger feeds on bony fishes and squid. Its reproduction is little-known but probably similar to that of other mackerel sharks, which are viviparous with embryos that feed on unfertilized eggs during gestation (oophagy). Adult females have a single functional ovary, on the right, and two functional uteruses. Males mature sexually at somewhere between 2.2 and 3.2 m (7.2 and 10.5 ft) long, while females mature at around 3.2 m (10 ft) long. No information is available on growth or aging.

== Human interactions ==
Because the bigeye sand tiger is encountered so infrequently, it has no commercial importance. It is caught incidentally on longlines and in gillnets and purse seines, though the paucity of captures suggest that it mostly lives in waters too deep for commercial fisheries. The International Union for Conservation of Nature (IUCN) has listed this species as Least Concern. Since 1997, the National Marine Fisheries Service (NMFS) has prohibited the taking of this species in United States waters.
