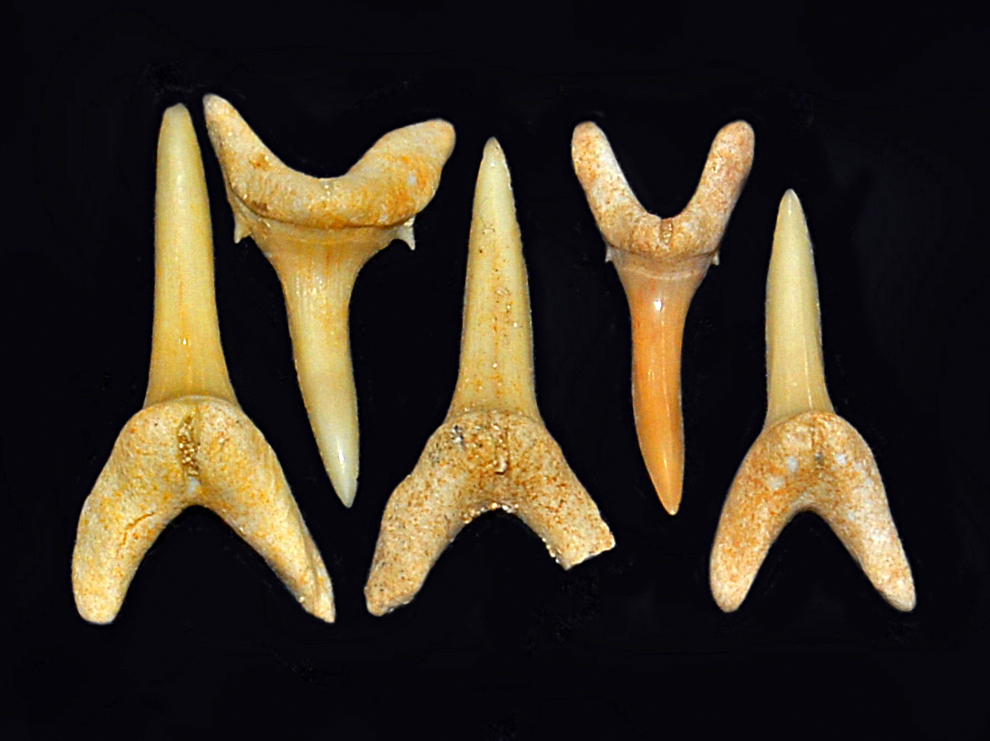
- Fossil teeth of Striatolamia whitei from Khouribga (Morocco)

Scientific classification
- Domain: Eukaryota
- Kingdom: Animalia
- Phylum: Chordata
- Class: Chondrichthyes
- Subclass: Elasmobranchii
- Division: Selachii
- Order: Lamniformes
- Family: Odontaspididae
- Genus: †Striatolamia; Glikman 1964

Synonyms
- Pseudodontaspis

= Striatolamia =

Striatolamia Temporal range: Early Paleocene-Late Miocene ~61.7–10.3 Ma

Extinct genus of sharks

Striatolamia is an extinct genus of sharks belonging to the family Odontaspididae. These extinct sharks lived from the Early Paleocene to Late Miocene (61.7 to 10.3 Ma).

== Etymology ==
The Latin genus name Striatolamia refers to the striations on the surface of the teeth.

== Taxonomy ==
This genus had been assigned to families Mitsukurinidae and Striatolamiidae by other authors.

Similar and related genera include Carcharoides, Parodontaspis, Priodontaspis, Pseudoisurus and Synodontaspis.

=== Species ===
Species within this genus include:

- Striatolamia macrota Agassiz 1843
- Striatolamia striata (Winkler 1874)
- Striatolamia whitei (Arambourg, 1952)

== Description ==
Striatolamia species could reach a length of about 350 centimetres (140 in). Its teeth are notably big and rather common in sediments. The anterior teeth have elongated crowns, with striations on the lingual face and small lateral cusplets. The lateral teeth are smaller and broader, with weaker striations.

S. macrota anterior teeth have smaller roots than S. striata, and they are often recurved. Another difference between these two species is the length of their teeth. Teeth of striata are generally smaller (13 to 51 millimetres (0.51 to 2.01 in)) than macrota (19 to 38 millimetres (0.75 to 1.50 in)).

== Distribution and habitat ==
Most widespread species of Striatolamia are S. striata and S. macrota. Fossil teeth and calcified vertebrae of Striatolamia species have been found all over the world. These sharks lived in waters with low salinity.

== See also ==
- Isurolamna
- Serratolamna
- Otodus
