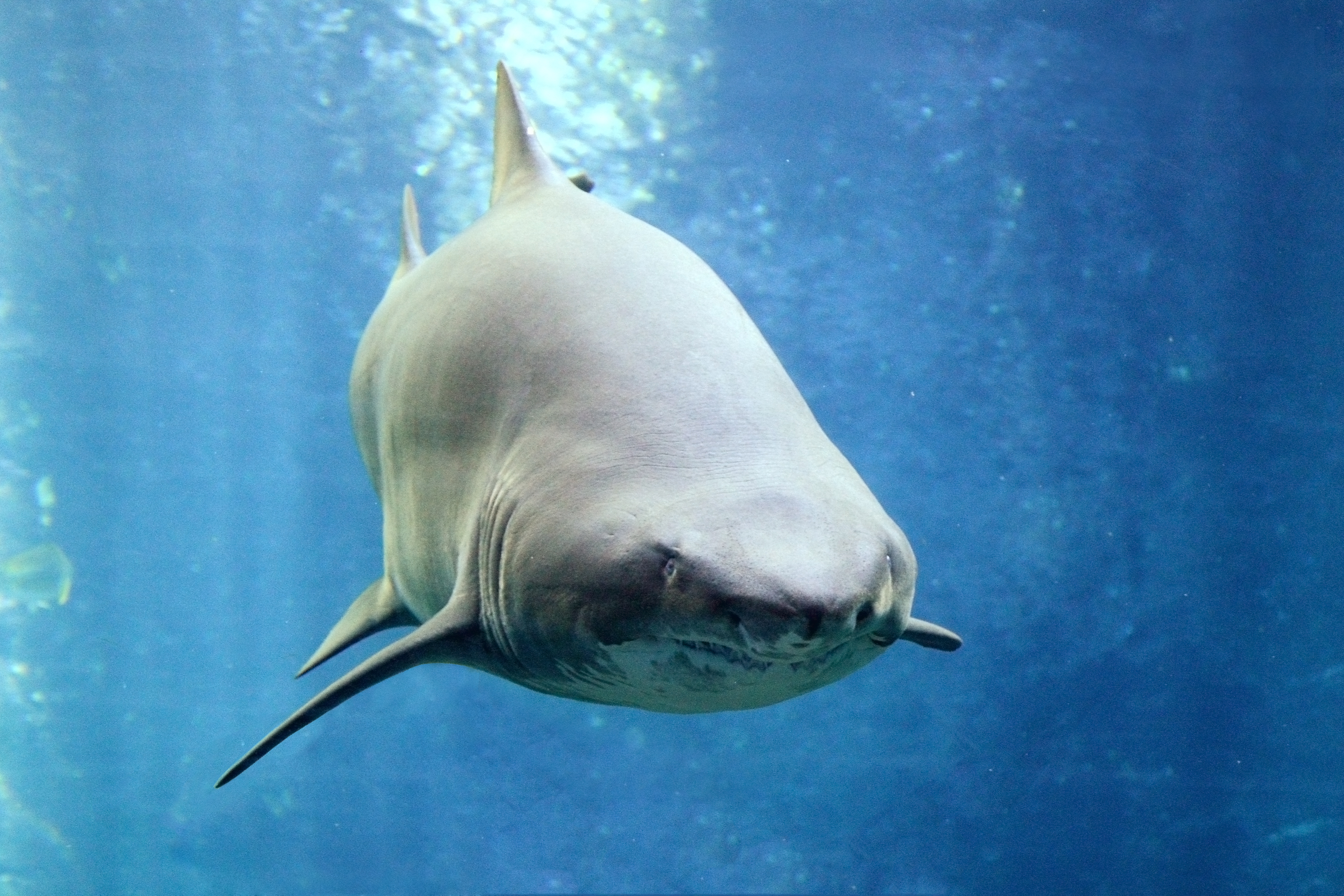
- Sand tiger shark (Carcharias taurus)

Scientific classification
- Kingdom: Animalia
- Phylum: Chordata
- Class: Chondrichthyes
- Subclass: Elasmobranchii
- Division: Selachii
- Order: Lamniformes
- Family: Carchariidae; Müller & Henle, 1838

Genera
- Carcharias; †Araloselachus

= Carchariidae =

Carchariidae Temporal range: Late Cretaceous to present

Family of sharks

Carchariidae is a family of lamniform sharks containing a single extant genus, Carcharias,

The family was recognized as distinct as early as 1838, but afterwards, it was grouped with the superficially very similar genus Odontaspis into the family Odontaspididae. However, phylogenetic studies since the 21st century have discovered that this placement is paraphyletic, with Carcharias being the second most basal extant lamniform after the goblin sharks, while Odontaspis diverged from the rest of the lamniforms only afterwards, and is thus more closely related to derived lamniforms. For this reason, the family Carchariidae was revived in 2019, and is presently accepted by Eschmeyer's Catalog of Fishes and the Shark-References database.

Aside from the stratigraphically widespread genus Carcharias, known from the Late Cretaceous onwards based on named species, the paleontological history of this family is uncertain due to the close similarity of its teeth with those of the Odontaspididae, which was why the two families were long confused. It is possible that some families placed in Odontaspididae may actually belong in Carchariidae. In 2020, the genus Araloselachus was recognized as an extinct member of the Carchariidae, although some authorities like the Shark-References database retain it in the Odontaspididae.

The distinctiveness of the Carchariidae makes the conservation of its only surviving member, the highly endangered Carcharias, even more of a priority, as its extinction would mean the loss of an ancient family that has existed since the Cretaceous.
