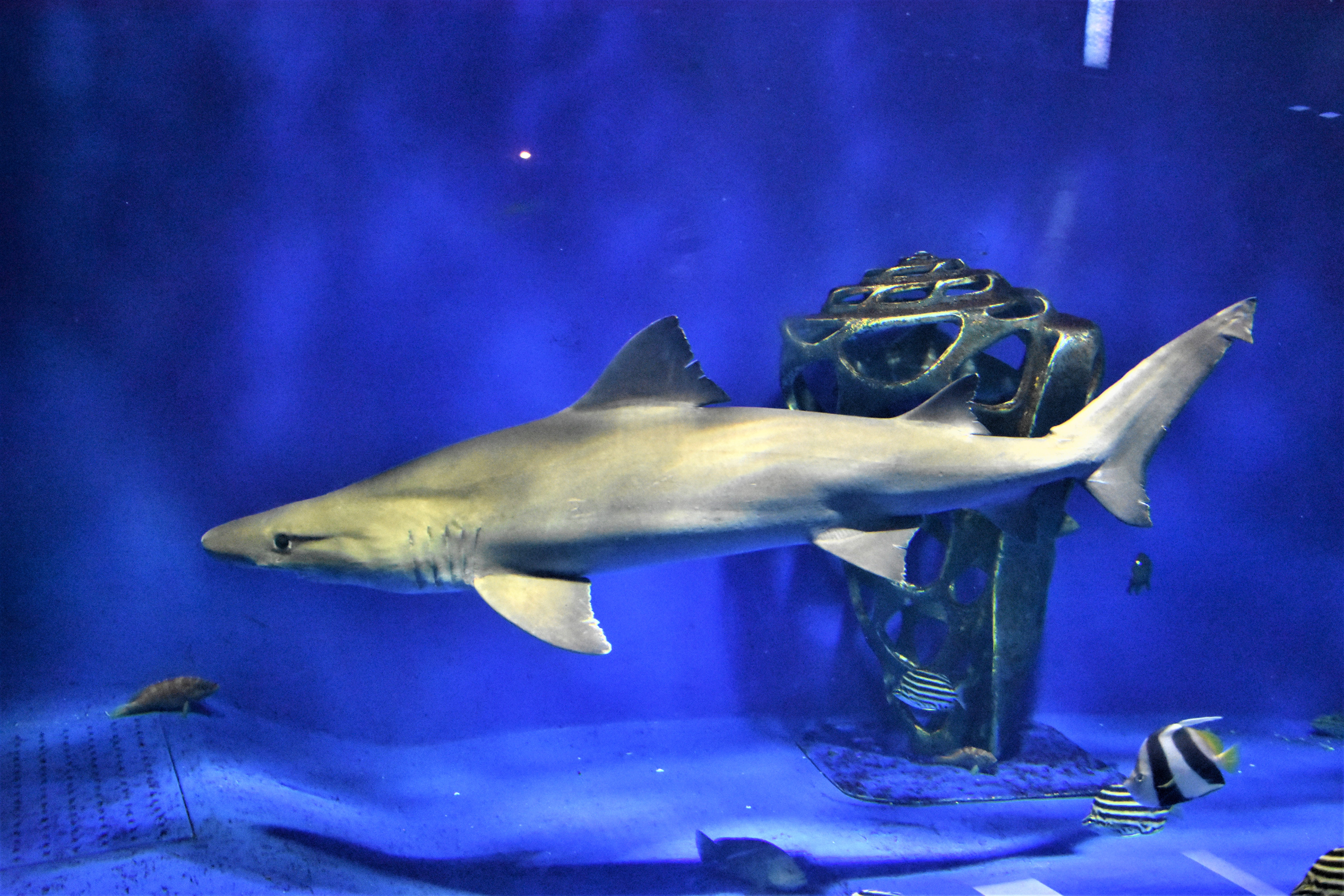
- Smalltooth sand tiger (Odontaspis ferox)

Scientific classification
- Kingdom: Animalia
- Phylum: Chordata
- Class: Chondrichthyes
- Subclass: Elasmobranchii
- Division: Selachii
- Order: Lamniformes
- Family: Odontaspididae; J. P. Müller & Henle, 1839

Type genus
- Odontaspis Agassiz, 1838

= Sand shark =

Sand sharks Temporal range: Upper Cretaceous–recent

Family of sharks

Sand sharks are mackerel sharks of the family Odontaspididae. They are found worldwide in temperate and tropical waters. The family contains two species in a single extant genus (Odontaspis), as well as several extinct genera. The genus Carcharias was formerly included in the family.

== Description ==
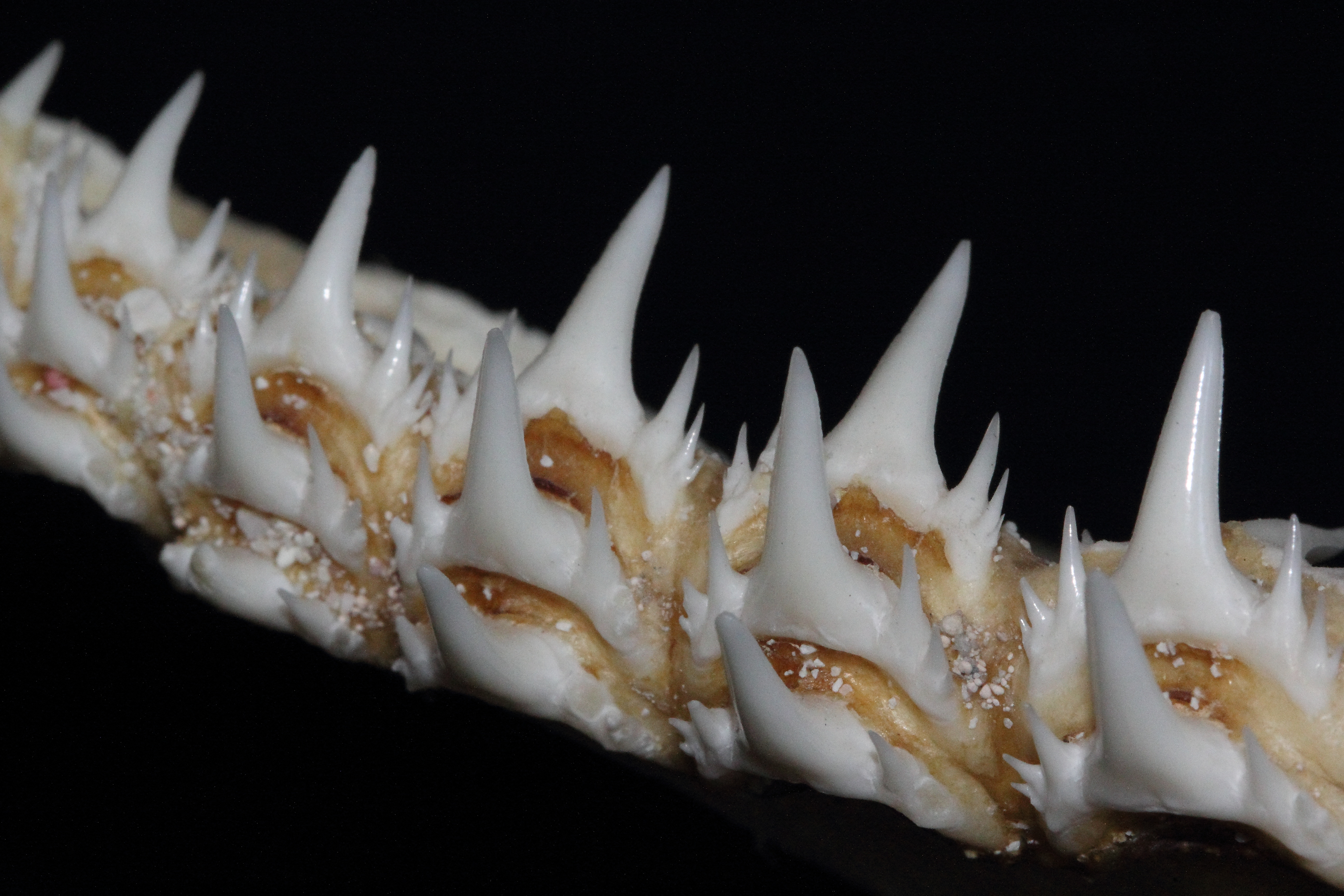
The long, narrow and sharp teeth of Odontaspis ferox.

The body tends to be brown with dark markings in the upper half. These markings disappear as they mature. Their needle-like teeth are highly adapted for impaling fish, their main prey. Their teeth are long, narrow, and very sharp with smooth edges, with one and on occasion two smaller cusplets on either side. Sand sharks have a large second dorsal fin.

== Location and origins ==
The name sand shark comes from their tendency to migrate toward shoreline habitats, and they are often seen swimming around the ocean floor in the surf zone; at times, they come very close to shore. They are often found in warm or temperate waters throughout the world's oceans, except the eastern Pacific. They also frequent the Mediterranean and Adriatic Seas at depths from 20 to 200 m (66 to 656 ft) and sometimes more.

== Behavior ==
The sand shark has a unique hunting strategy. It is able to gulp air from above the surface and collect the air in its stomach. This enables it to become buoyant and approach its prey virtually motionless. During the day, the sand shark stays mostly inactive, but at night, it becomes active and resumes hunting activities. Its staple is small fish, but it eats crustaceans and squid, as well. It occasionally hunts in shivers (groups), and has even been known to attack full fishing nets.

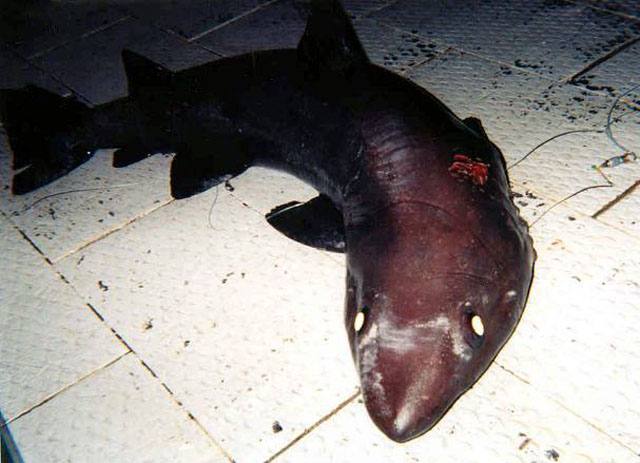
The rarely-seen Odontaspis noronhai

== Reproduction ==
Sand sharks only develop two embryos, one in each uterus. The largest and strongest embryos consume their siblings in the womb (intrauterine cannibalism) before each surviving pup is born. It has one of the lowest reproduction rates of all sharks and is susceptible to even minimal population pressure, so it is listed as vulnerable and is protected in much of its range.

== Attacks on people ==
Sand sharks are not known to attack humans. If a person were to provoke a sand shark, it may retaliate defensively. Sand sharks are generally not aggressive, but harass divers who are spearfishing. In North America, wreck divers regularly visit the World War II shipwrecks to dive with the sharks that make the wrecks their home.

== Conservation ==
A recent report from the PEW Charitable Trusts suggests a new management approach used for large mammals that have suffered population declines could hold promise for sharks. Because of the life-history characteristics of sharks, conventional fisheries management approaches, such as reaching maximum sustainable yield, may not be sufficient to rebuild depleted shark populations. Some of the more stringent approaches used to reverse declines in large mammals may be appropriate for sharks, including prohibitions on the retention of the most vulnerable species and regulation of international trade.

== Species ==
The family contains two extant species in one genus, as well as many extinct species in several genera.

- Genus Odontaspis Agassiz 1838
  - Odontaspis ferox A. Risso, 1810 (smalltooth sand tiger)
  - Odontaspis noronhai Maul, 1955 (bigeye sand tiger)

Until recently, the sand tiger shark in the genus Carcharias was also classified with this group, due to its very close morphological similarities. However, mitochondrial DNA analysis has found it to be significantly more basal than Odontaspis, which is actually more closely related to the rest of the Lamniformes. For this reason, Carcharias and Odontaspis do not actually form a monophyletic clade, making the family polyphyletic as previously defined. Due to these findings, Carcharias was split into its own family, Carchariidae.

=== Fossil taxa ===
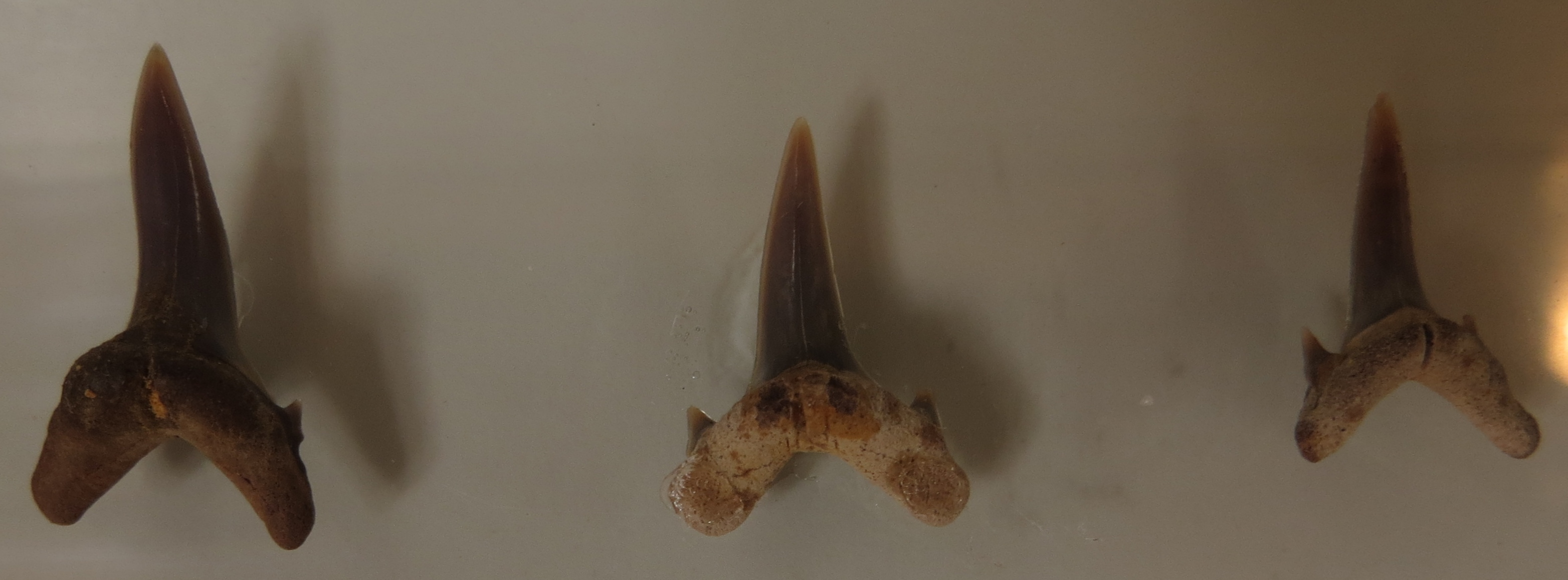
Teeth of Synodontaspis gracilis

The following fossil genera are known:

- Genus Striatolamia † Glikman, 1964
- Genus Carcharoides † Ameghino, 1901
- Genus Parodontaspis † White, 1931
- Genus Priodontaspis † Ameghino, 1901
- Genus Pseudoisurus † Glikman, 1957
- Genus Synodontaspis † White, 1931
- Subfamily Johnlonginae † Shimada, 2015
  - Genus Johnlongia †
  - Genus Pseudomegachasma † (Shimada, 2015)
