= Pseudomegachasma =

Pseudomegachasma Temporal range: Cenomanian

Scientific classification
- Kingdom: Animalia
- Phylum: Chordata
- Class: Chondrichthyes
- Subclass: Elasmobranchii
- Division: Selachii
- Order: Lamniformes
- Family: Odontaspididae
- Subfamily: †Johnlonginae
- Genus: †Pseudomegachasma; Shimada, 2015

Species
- P. casei P. comanchensis

Extinct genus of sharks

Pseudomegachasma ("false megamouth") is an extinct genus of filter-feeding shark that was closely related to the modern sand tiger shark. It is known from Cretaceous strata in Russia and the United States, and is the only known planktivorous odontaspid, as well as the oldest known planktivorous elasmobranch. It most likely derived from its closest relative, the piscivorous shark Johnlongia. As its name suggests, it was originally classified under Megachasma, before it was found to be an odontaspid.
