= Johnlonginae =

Johnlonginae Temporal range: Late Cretaceous

Scientific classification
- Domain: Eukaryota
- Kingdom: Animalia
- Phylum: Chordata
- Class: Chondrichthyes
- Subclass: Elasmobranchii
- Division: Selachii
- Superorder: Galeomorphii
- Order: Lamniformes
- Family: Odontaspididae
- Subfamily: †Johnlonginae; Shimada, 2015

Genera
- Johnlongia; Pseudomegachasma

Extinct subfamily of sharks

Johnlonginae is an extinct subfamily of sand shark with two genera: Johnlongia and Pseudomegachasma. The latter genus is thought to have evolved from former. They are among the older sand sharks, and are only known from the Cretaceous period.
