= Adolfo de Noronha =

Portuguese naturalist

Adolfo César de Noronha
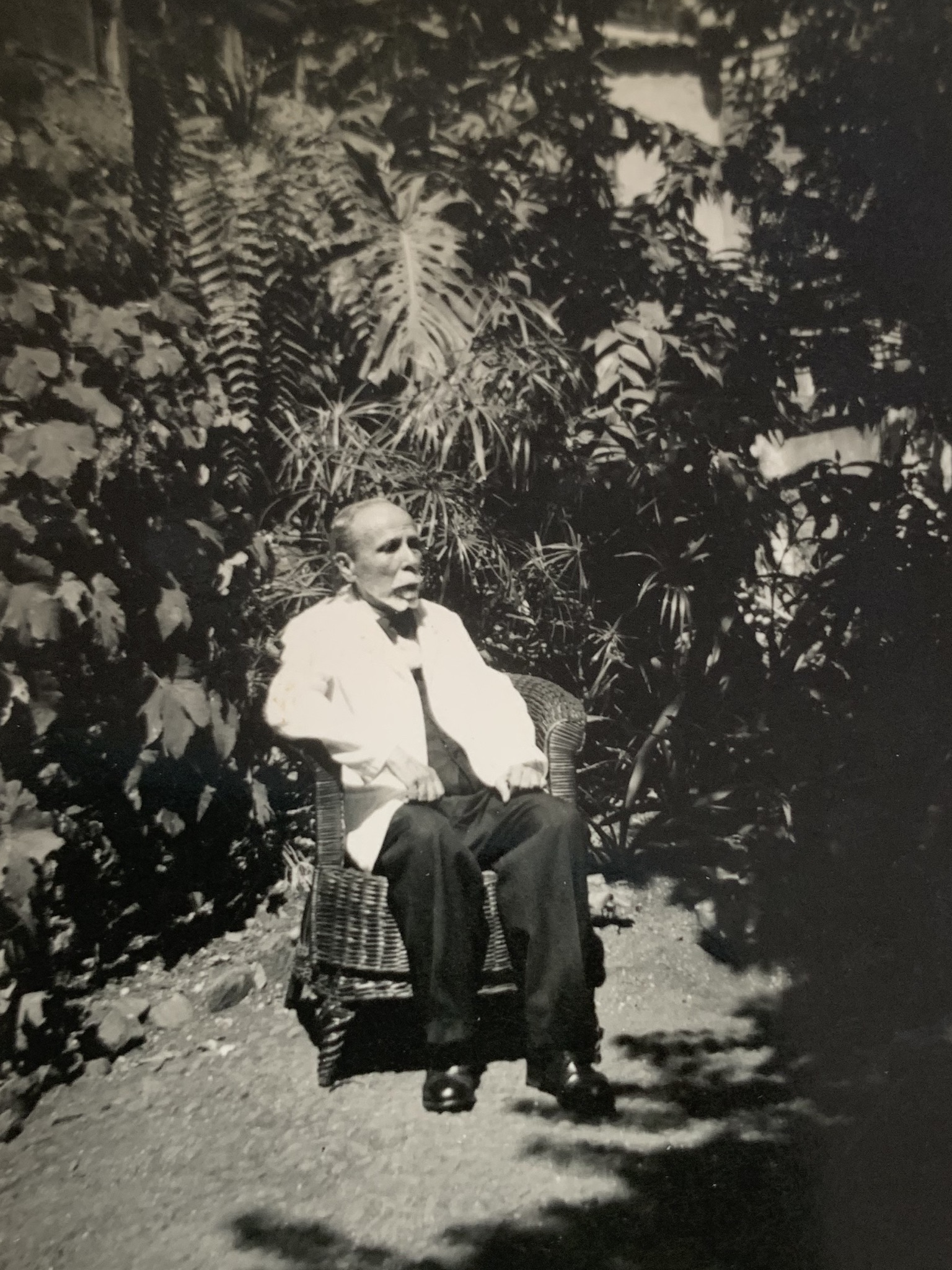
- Born: 9 September 1873; Funchal, Madeira Island, Portugal
- Died: 6 April 1963 (aged 89); Funchal, Madeira Island, Portugal
- Spouse: Georgina Rebelo de Oliveira (m.1923; died 1945)

Adolfo César de Noronha (Funchal, 9 September 1873 — Funchal, 6 April 1963) was a Portuguese naturalist.

== Early life ==
Adolfo César de Noronha was born in Funchal, Madeira Island on September 9, 1873. His father, Augusto Nóbrega de Noronha (1849-1920), was a minor Portuguese landowner. His mother was Adelaide Augusta da Silva (1856-1938).

== Education ==
Noronha completed his secondary education at the Liceu Nacional do Funchal. He continued his studies outside Madeira, where he attended the Polytechnic School of Lisbon and the Polytechnic Institute of Porto.

== Career ==
Noronha returned to Funchal after college. On December 11, 1914, he was appointed librarian at the Municipal Library of Funchal. He became the Director in 1928, a position he held until his retirement in 1943.

In addition to his duties as librarian and Director of the Municipal Library of Funchal, he dedicated himself to the natural history of the Madeira archipelago. He performed meteorological observations and collected plant and animal specimens. Due to his knowledge of the local area and his ability to speak English, French, and German, he supported international scientific expeditions visiting the islands. Their collection of fossils and ornithological observations and, in particular, deep-sea fish caught by Black scabbard fishermen, were notable and in many seminal cases.

Noronha's efforts served as the basis for studies carried out by scientists of the time, notably Serbian paleontologist Živko Joksimović, ornithologist Ernesto Schmitz, and paleontologists Leo Paul Oppenheim and Johannes Böhm.

In addition to multiple specimens of fish caught while swordfishing, he collected sponges and bryozoans, many of which were newly identified species. The best known case was the discovery, during dredging operations carried out in 1909 off the coast of the island of Porto Santo, of an encrusting sponge with limestone and siliceous spicules, which was given the name Merlia normani. These dredging operations were done in conjunction with British spongiologist Randolph Kirkpatrick, who published the description of M. normani. Kirkpatrick dedicated a sponge genus to Noronha in 1908, that is now considered a taxonomic synonym of Merlia. His collaboration and correspondence with scientists of various nationalities resulted in his name being used for several taxa, including Schizoporella noronhai (an abyssal bryozoan), Pecten noronhai, and Spondylus noronhai (fossil bivalve mollusks).

In 1922, he led a scientific expedition to the Savage Islands, which he had also visited in 1906 and 1909, along with Adão Nunes and Damião Peres. After difficulties with transport back to Madeira, the group stayed two months on the islands. The return to Funchal and the reason for the reception, were noted in the Diário de Notícias do Funchal, of June 13, 1922. Meteorological statistics and the collected examples were sent to international experts.

His main contribution to science was in the study of deepwater fish in the Madeira archipelago, a subject in which he was a pioneer. Taking advantage of the abyssal fishing techniques developed to capture the black scabbardfish (Aphanopus carbo), he developed an in-depth study of this species, which he published in 1925. He also studied the deep-sea fish that were caught accidentally in the black scabbardfish fishery, subsequently describing two new species; Diplogonurus maderensis, and a rare deep shark, which he dedicated to his friend Alberto Artur Sarmento with the binomial, Squaliolus sarmenti.

In addition to collaborating with Fernando Augusto da Silva and Carlos Azevedo de Meneses in the preparation of Elucidário Madeirense (1922), he co-authored a paper entitled Os Peixe dos Mares da Wood, with Sarmento in 1934. In 1948, he produced the second volume (dedicated to fish) of the work Vertebrados da Madeira, edited by the General Board of the Autonomous District of Funchal.

Noronha's actions were instrumental in the movement of the Funchal Municipal Library, which was originally housed in a small facility in the Paços do Concelho building. He also led the initiative to acquire a building that would allow for the creation of a museum to house the collections of natural history and other heritage belonging to the Municipality of Funchal.

In 1929, his work led to the founding of the Madeira Regional Museum and the acquisition of the São Pedro Palace (Funchal). He issued a postage stamp from Madeira, the proceeds from which were put toward the acquisition of the palace, and with the collaboration of Günther E. Maul, the museum opened in 1933, giving rise to the current Museum of Natural History in Funchal.

== Personal life ==
Noronha married Georgina Rebelo de Oliveira in 1923, at age 49 and the couple rented a house in Rua do Quebra-Costas, Funchal. They had no children.

When his wife died in 1945, Noronha moved back to the house where he grew up, then owned by his nieces Adelaide Susana de Noronha Wilbraham Soares de Sousa (1915-2017) and Laura Cristina de Noronha Wilbraham (1917-2008). He would live in this house for the rest of his life.

== Retirement and death ==
He retired on September 9, 1943. On the same day, the Funchal City Hall gave his name to the main room of the Museum.

Noronha died on April 6, 1963, in the house where he had been born.
