= Johnlongia =

Johnlongia Temporal range: Albian-Coniacian

Scientific classification
- Kingdom: Animalia
- Phylum: Chordata
- Class: Chondrichthyes
- Subclass: Elasmobranchii
- Division: Selachii
- Order: Lamniformes
- Family: Odontaspididae
- Subfamily: †Johnlonginae
- Genus: †Johnlongia; Siverson, 1996

Species
- J. parvidens; J. allocotodon

Extinct genus of shark

Johnlongia is an extinct genus of sand shark from the Cretaceous period. It contains two described species, J. parvidens and J. allocotodon, and possibly a third unnamed species from the Niobrara Chalk. It is presumed piscivorous; however, it forms a clade with an early filter-feeding shark genus, Pseudomegachasma.
