= Johannes Böhm (geologist) =

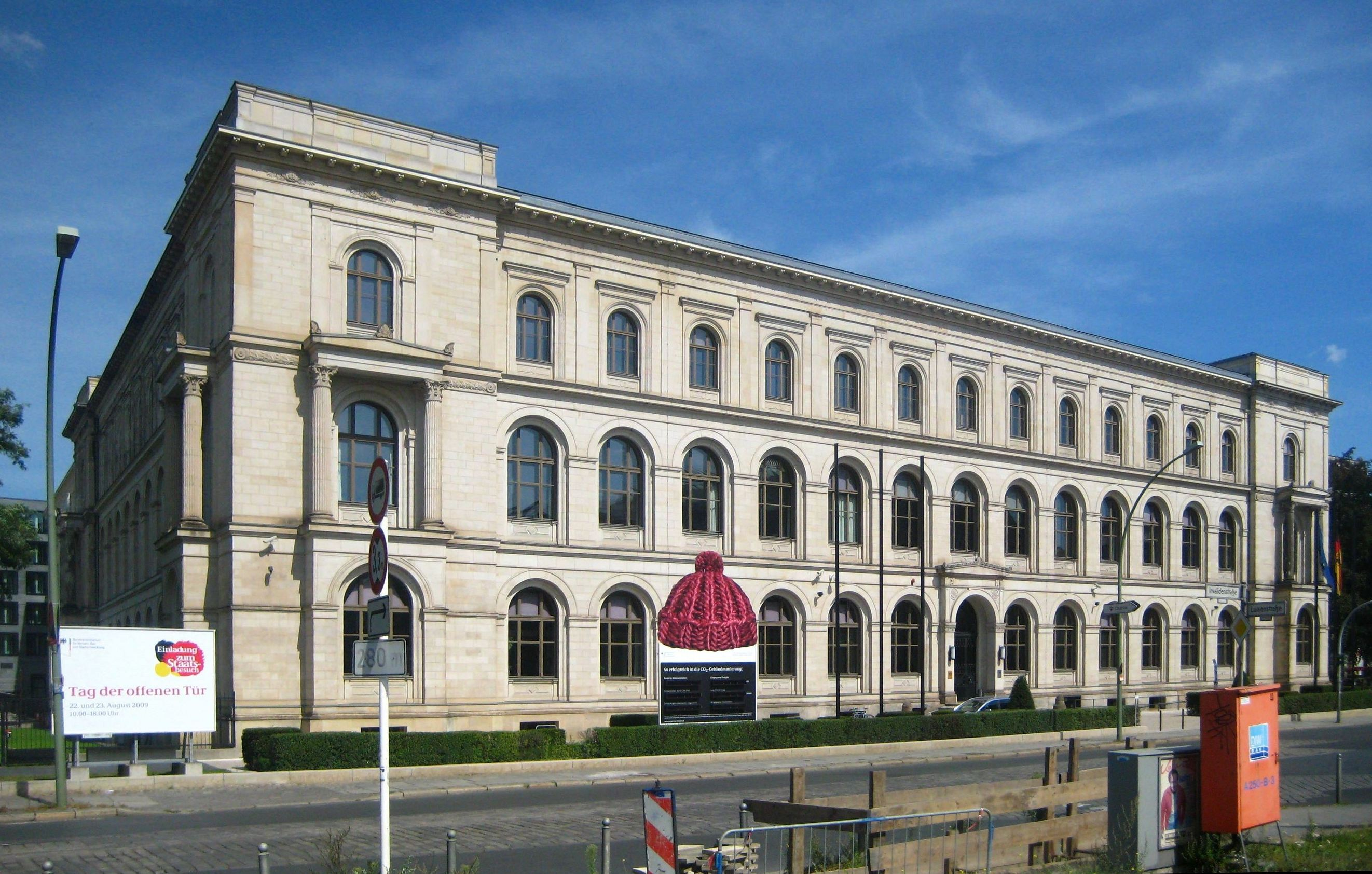
Invalidenstraße 44 Preußische Geologische Landesanstalt

Johannes Böhm (1857–1938) was a German geologist and palaeontologist.

He was a researcher in the Prussian Geological Institute in Berlin (Preußische Geologische Landesanstalt)

== Works ==
partial list

- Der Grünsand von Aachen und seine Molluskenfauna Bonn, Universitäts Bonn, Buchdruckerei von C. Georgi,1885. online
- Die Fossilien von Java auf Grund einer Sammlung von Dr. R.D.M. Verbeek und von Anderen – Die Mollusken der Njalindungsschichten, Schluss: Echinodermata und Arthropoda. with K. Martin and H. Gerth. Leiden, Brill, 1909.Series:Sammlungen des Geologischen Reichs-Museums in Leiden, n.F, Bd.1, Abt.2, Heft 4
- Über die obertriadische Fauna der Bäreninsel Stockholm, kungl. Boktryckeriet, 1903.
- Geologie und paläontologie der Subhercynen kreidemulde with Henry Schröder. Berlin, Im vertrieb bei der Königlichen geologischen landesanstalt: Abhandlungen der Königlich preussischen geologischen landesanstalt. neue folge., hft. 56 1909.
