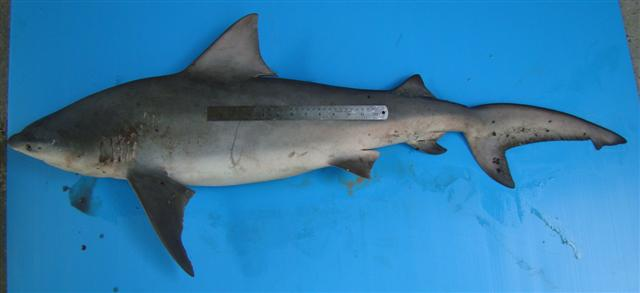

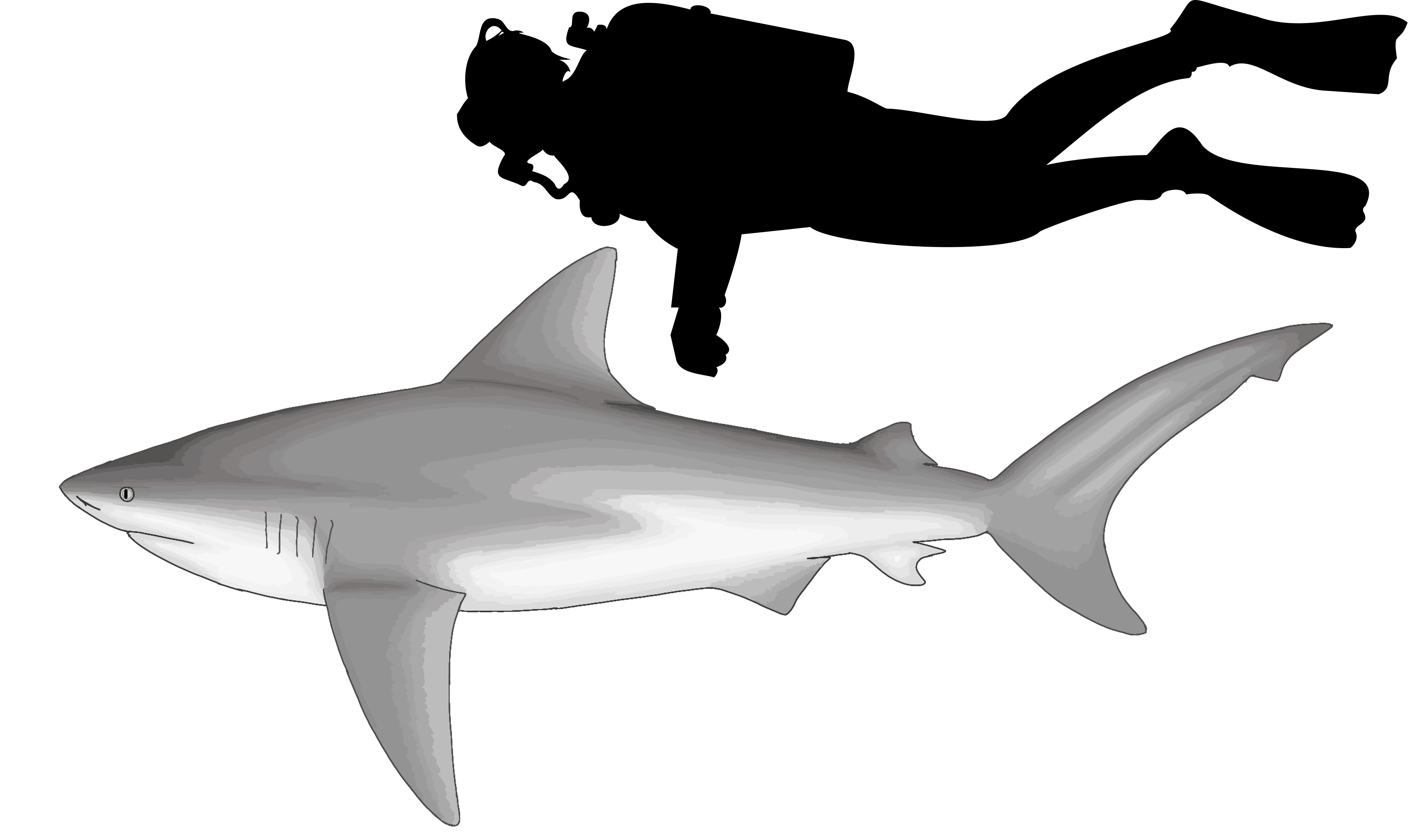
- 2.8 metre (9’2) female Pigeye shark compared to a 1.8 metre (5’11) human

Conservation status
- Vulnerable (IUCN 3.1)

Scientific classification
- Kingdom: Animalia
- Phylum: Chordata
- Class: Chondrichthyes
- Subclass: Elasmobranchii
- Division: Selachii
- Order: Carcharhiniformes
- Family: Carcharhinidae
- Genus: Carcharhinus
- Species: C. amboinensis

Binomial name
- Carcharhinus amboinensis (Müller & Henle, 1839)
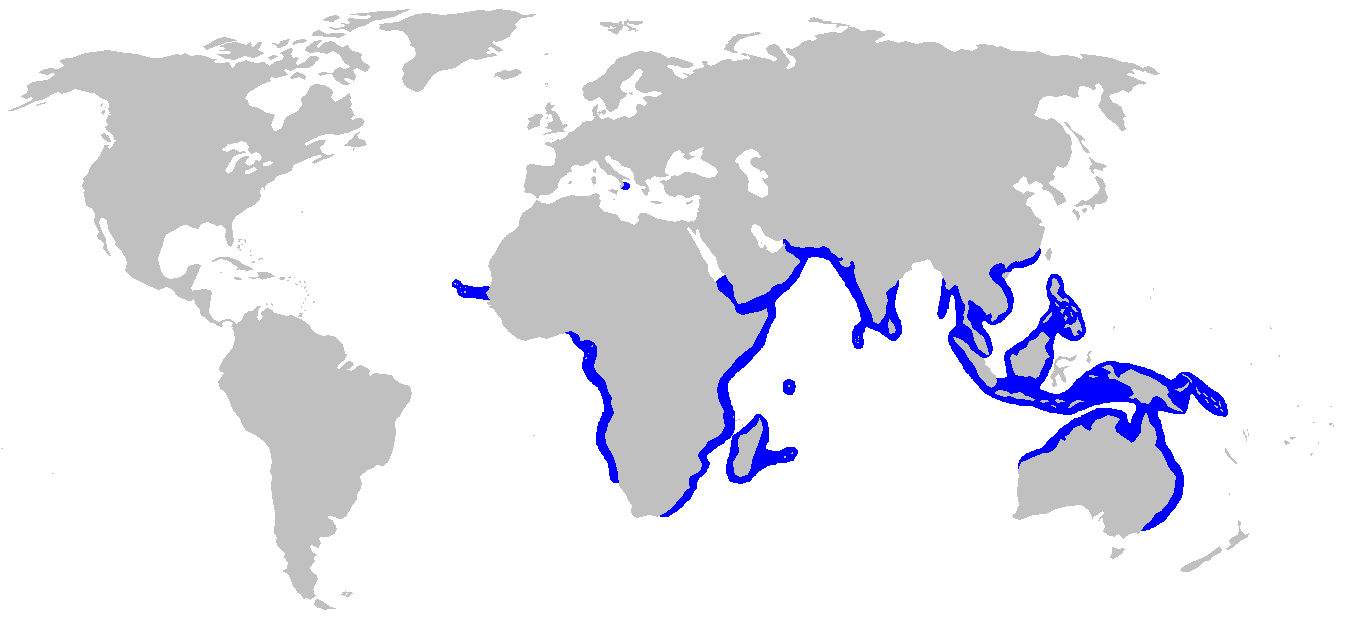
- Range of the pigeye shark

Synonyms
- Carcharias amboinensis Müller & Henle, 1839; Carcharias henlei Bleeker, 1853; Carcharias brachyrhynchos Bleeker, 1859; Triaenodon obtusus Day, 1878

= Pigeye shark =

Pigeye shark Temporal range: Late Miocene to present

Species of shark

The pigeye shark or Java shark (Carcharhinus amboinensis) is an uncommon species of requiem shark, in the family Carcharhinidae, found in the warm coastal waters of the eastern Atlantic and western Indo-Pacific. It prefers shallow, murky environments with soft bottoms, and tends to roam within a fairly localized area. With its bulky grey body, small eyes, and short, blunt snout, the pigeye shark looks almost identical to (and is often confused with) the better-known bull shark (C. leucas). The two species differ in vertebral count, the relative sizes of the dorsal fins, and other subtle traits. This shark typically reaches lengths of 1.9–2.5 m (6.2–8.2 ft).

The pigeye shark is an apex predator that mostly hunts low in the water column. It has a varied diet, consisting mainly of bony and cartilaginous fishes and also including crustaceans, molluscs, sea snakes, and cetaceans. This species gives birth to live young, with the developing embryos sustained to term via a placental connection to their mother. Litters of three to thirteen pups are born after a gestation period of nine or twelve months. Young sharks spend their first few years of life in sheltered inshore habitats such as bays, where their movements follow tidal and seasonal patterns. The pigeye shark's size and dentition make it potentially dangerous, though it has not been known to attack humans. The shark is infrequently caught in shark nets protecting beaches and by fisheries, which use it for meat and fins. The IUCN presently assesses this species as vulnerable.

== Taxonomy ==
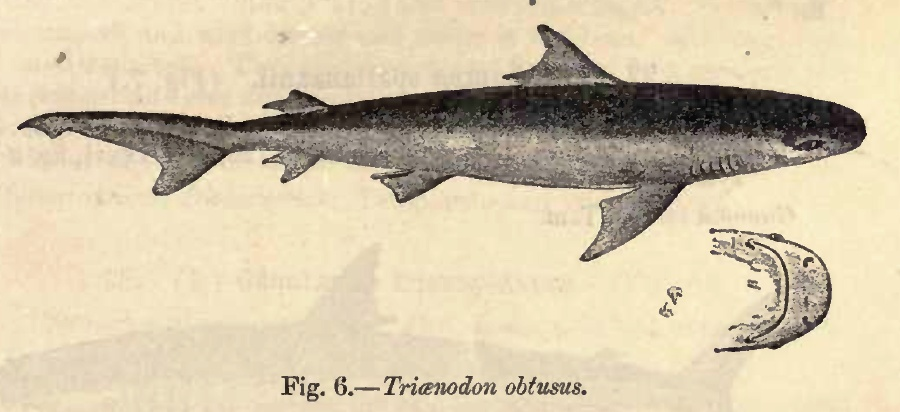
Drawing of Triaenodon obtusus, a synonym of C. amboinensis, from Francis Day's Fauna of British India (1889)

German biologists Johannes Müller and Jakob Henle described the pigeye shark and named it Carcharias (Prionodon) amboinensis in their 1839 Systematische Beschreibung der Plagiostomen. Later authors reassigned it to the genus Carcharhinus. The type specimen is a stuffed female 74 cm (29 in) long, originally caught off Ambon Island in Indonesia, from which the specific epithet is derived. Several junior synonyms are known for this species, among them Triaenodon obtusus, which was based on a near-birth pigeye shark foetus.

Fossil teeth of the pigeye shark are known from the Late Miocene of Brunei, representing the oldest known record of the species.

== Phylogeny and evolution ==
Since the pigeye shark so strongly resembles the bull shark, morphology-based phylogenetic studies have considered the two species to be closely related. Neither this nor any other arrangement is strongly supported by molecular phylogenetic research, which to date has been inconclusive regarding this shark's evolutionary relationship to other Carcharhinus species.

Genetic analysis of pigeye sharks across northern Australia suggest that the evolutionary history of this species was affected by coastline changes during the Pleistocene epoch (2.6 million to 12,000 years ago). The patterns of diversity found in its mitochondrial DNA are consistent with the repeated splitting and merging of its populations as geographical barriers were alternately formed and inundated. The most recent of these barriers was a land bridge across the Torres Strait that reopened only some 6,000 years ago; as a result, significant genetic separation exists between the sharks found off Western Australia and the Northern Territory and those found off Queensland.

== Description ==
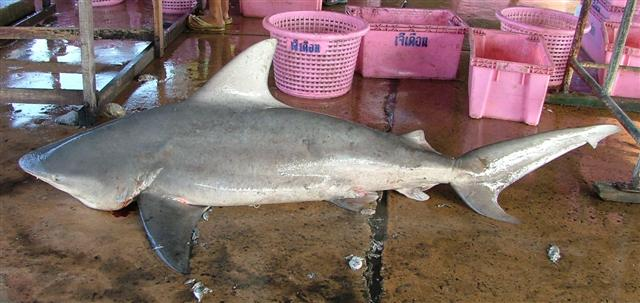

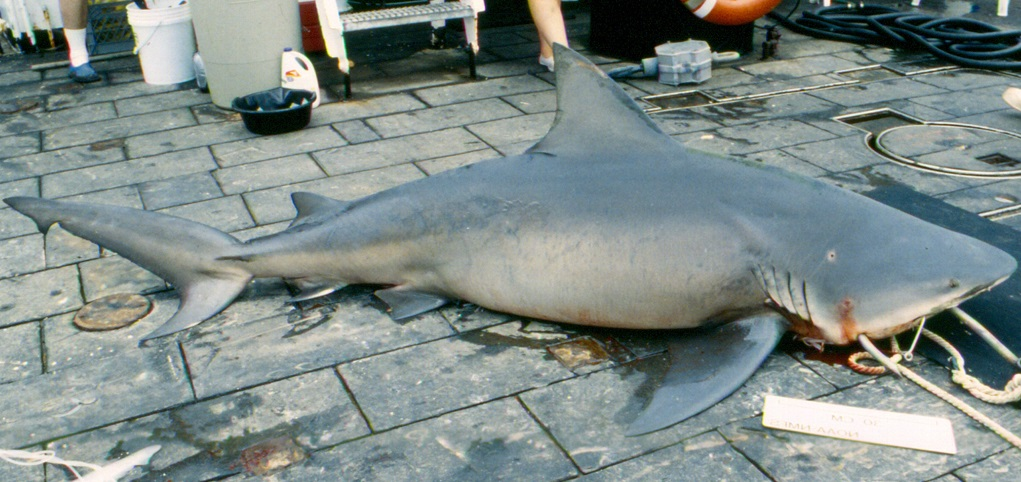
The pigeye shark (top) closely resembles the bull shark (bottom); external differences between the two species include the relative sizes of the dorsal fins and the angle of the notch in the anal fin.

The pigeye shark is a very robust-bodied species with a short, broad, and rounded snout. The small and circular eyes are equipped with nictitating membranes. The anterior rims of the nostrils bear medium-sized flaps of skin. The mouth forms a wide arch and has barely noticeable furrows at the corners. There are 11–13 (usually 12) upper and 10–12 (usually 11) lower tooth rows on each side; in addition, there are single rows of tiny teeth at the upper and lower symphyses (jaw midpoints). The teeth are broad and triangular with serrated edges; those in the lower jaw are slightly narrower, more upright, and more finely serrated than those in the upper. The five pairs of gill slits are of moderate length.

The first dorsal fin is large and triangular, with a pointed apex and a concave trailing margin; it originates roughly over the posterior insertions of the pectoral fins. The second dorsal fin is less than a third as high as the first, and originates ahead of the anal fin. There is no midline ridge between the dorsal fins. The long pectoral fins are broad and slightly falcate (sickle-shaped), becoming narrow and pointed at the tips. The anal fin has a sharply notched trailing margin. The caudal peduncle has a deep notch on its upper surface at the caudal fin origin. The caudal fin is asymmetrical, with a well-developed lower lobe and a longer upper lobe with a notch in the trailing margin near its tip.

The skin is covered by rather large dermal denticles, which become more tightly packed and overlapping with age; each denticle bears three to five horizontal ridges and five posterior teeth. This species is grey above and white below, with a faint pale band on the flanks. The second dorsal fin and lower caudal fin lobe darken at the tips, particularly in juveniles. An albino individual was caught off Queensland in 1987, which was the first known example of albinism in a requiem shark. An adult pigeye shark typically measures 1.9–2.5 m (6.2–8.2 ft) long, while the largest individuals reach 2.8 m (9.2 ft) long.

The pigeye shark can be most reliably distinguished from the bull shark by the number of precaudal (before the caudal fin) vertebrae (89–95 in C. amboinensis versus 101–123 in C. leucas). Externally, it has a greater size difference between its dorsal fins (first-to-second height ratio >3.1:1 versus ≤3.1:1 in C. leucas) and the notch in its anal fin margin forms an acute angle (versus a right angle in C. leucas). This species also usually has fewer tooth rows in the lower jaw (10–12 on each side versus 12–13 in C. leucas).

== Distribution and habitat ==
Though widely distributed in the tropical and subtropical marine waters of Eurasia, Africa, and Oceania, the pigeye shark does not appear to be common anywhere. Existing records are patchy, and the full extent of its range may be obscured by confusion with the bull shark. In the eastern Atlantic, it is found off Cape Verde and Senegal, and from Nigeria to Namibia; there is a single Mediterranean record from off Crotone, Italy. It occurs all along the continental periphery of the Indian Ocean, from eastern South Africa to the Arabian Peninsula (including Madagascar, the Seychelles, and Mauritius), to Southeast Asia and northern Australia. Its range extends into the Pacific, northward to the Philippines and southern China, and eastward to New Guinea and some Micronesian islands. Tagging and genetic data indicate that pigeye sharks, particularly juveniles, are not strongly migratory and tend to remain in a local area. The longest recorded distance covered by an adult is 1,080 km (670 mi).

The pigeye shark inhabits coastal waters down to a depth of 150 m (490 ft), favouring environments with fine sediment and murky water. It sometimes enters estuaries, but unlike the bull shark, it does not ascend rivers and avoids brackish water. The movements and habitat usage of juvenile pigeye sharks have been extensively studied in Cleveland Bay in northeastern Queensland. Young sharks live in the bay year-round, staying mostly in the eastern side where the input from three rivers produces strong currents and high turbidity. Individual home ranges are relatively small, averaging 30 km^{2} (12 sq mi), and increase in size with age. The juveniles generally stay in water less than 40 m (130 ft) deep, with the youngest sharks spending the most time in the shallowest parts of the bay. They swim into the intertidal zone with the rising tide and depart as the tide recedes; this movement may relate to exploiting foraging opportunities on the submerged mud flats, or to avoiding predation or competition by staying out of the deeper waters occupied by larger sharks. There is also an annual movement cycle where the juveniles move closer to the river mouths during the dry season and farther from them during the wet season; since the rainy season brings a higher flow of fresh water into the bay, the sharks may be responding directly or indirectly to the resultant decrease in salinity and dissolved oxygen levels.

== Biology and ecology ==
The pigeye shark is a largely solitary animal, though occasionally several individuals may be found at the same location. In the Mozambique Channel, it outnumbers the bull shark on the east side while the opposite is true on the west side, suggesting there may be competitive exclusion between these similar species. Parasites documented from the pigeye shark include the myxosporean Kudoa carcharhini, the copepods Pandarus smithii and P. cranchii, and the tapeworms Callitetrarhynchus gracilis, Cathetocephalus sp., Floriceps minacanthus, Heteronybelinia australis, Otobothrium australe, O. crenacolle, and Protogrillotia sp. Young pigeye sharks are potentially vulnerable to predation by larger sharks. The natural mortality for juveniles in Cleveland Bay has been measured at no more than 5% per year; this rate is comparable to that in juvenile bull sharks, and is much lower than in juvenile blacktip sharks (C. limbatus) or lemon sharks (Negaprion brevirostris).

=== Feeding ===
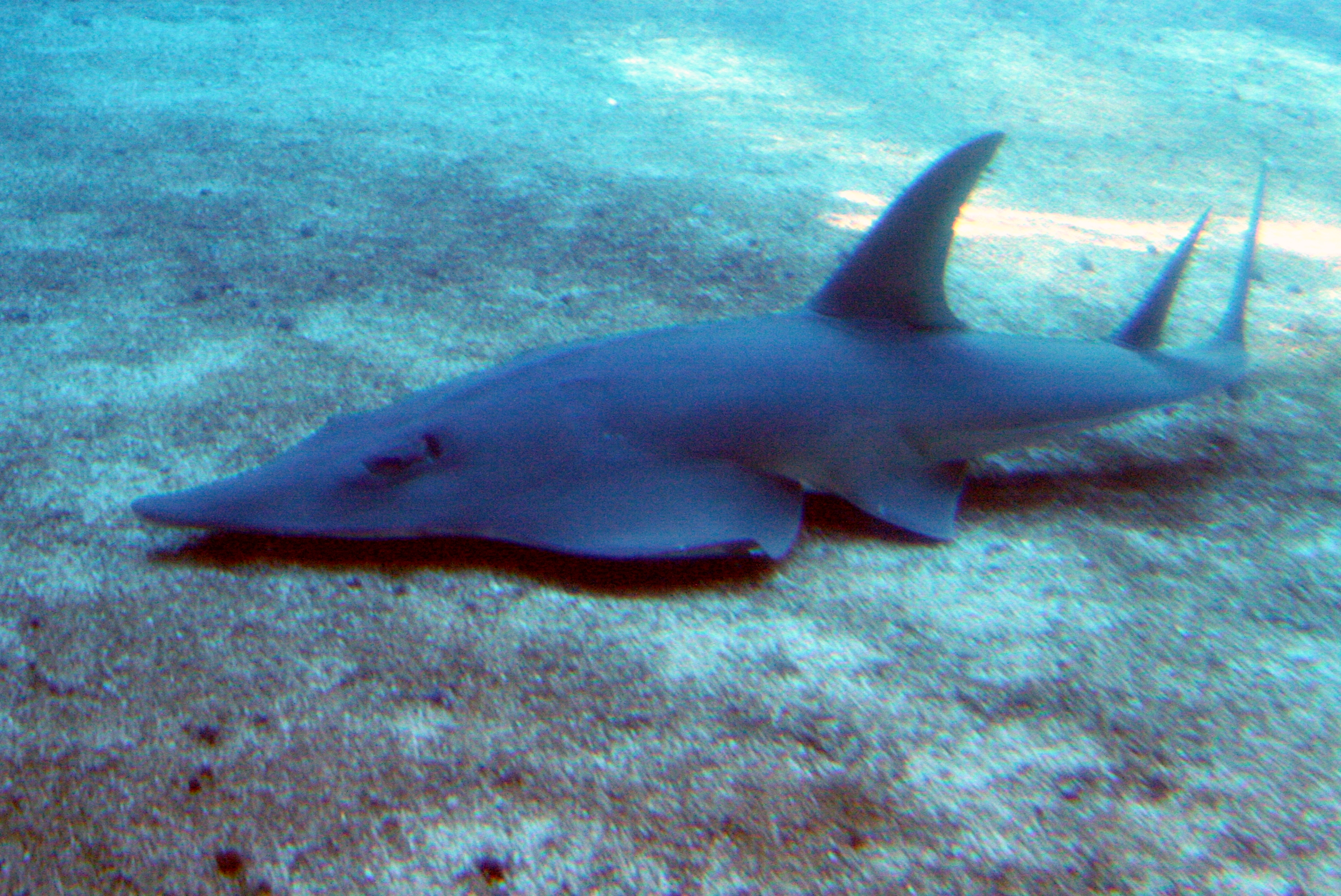
Guitarfishes and other cartilaginous fishes are preyed upon by the pigeye shark, particularly off South Africa.

Though the pigeye shark will take prey from anywhere in the water column, it tends to hunt close to the sea floor. An apex predator, it feeds mainly on teleost fishes such as croakers, flatfishes, and cutlassfishes, and to a lesser extent on cartilaginous fishes, cephalopods, and decapod crustaceans. It has also been recorded eating gastropods, sea snakes, dolphins, and whale carrion. Other sharks and rays figure much more prominently in the diets of South African pigeye sharks than those from other regions; the types consumed include requiem sharks, catsharks, angel sharks, guitarfishes, stingrays, and eagle rays.

=== Life history ===
The pigeye shark is viviparous; like in other requiem sharks, after the developing embryo depletes its supply of yolk, it is sustained to term by its mother through a placental connection formed from the empty yolk sac. Mature females have a single functional ovary and two functional uteruses. Reproductive details vary among regions: off South Africa, the gestation period lasts about 12 months, with mating and birthing both occurring in late summer. The litters range from three to seven pups (average five) and the newborns are around 75–79 cm (30–31 in) long. Off northern Australia, the gestation period lasts 9 months, with birthing taking place in November and December. The litters range from six to 13 pups (average 9) and the newborns are around 59–66 cm (23–26 in) long.

Young sharks can be found in shallow inshore environments such as bays until at least three years of age, suggesting this species uses these sheltered habitats as nurseries. As the sharks grow older, they venture farther from land into deeper water, more and more often, until they eventually disperse. This is a long-lived, slow-growing species; males grow faster and reach a smaller ultimate size than females. Sexual maturity is attained at around 2.1 m (6.9 ft) long and 12 years of age for males, and 2.2 m (7.2 ft) long and 13 years of age for females. The maximum lifespan is at least 26 years for males and 30 years for females.

== Human interactions ==
Large and formidably toothed, the pigeye shark is regarded as potentially dangerous to humans, and has been implicated in at least one attack on a human. In July 2020, at Fitzroy Island off the east coast of Queensland, Australia, free diver Anika Craney was bitten on her lower leg by what was later identified as a pigeye shark. Craney survived the encounter despite sustaining a serious injury, including having her artery severed. This species is caught infrequently on longlines and in gillnets, and is used for meat and fins. As a predator, though, the shark can accumulate ciguatera toxins produced by dinoflagellates within its tissues. In November 1993, some 500 people in Manakara, Madagascar, were poisoned, 98 of them fatally, after eating meat from a pigeye shark. This was the first recorded mass ciguatera outbreak caused by a shark, as well as the first with a significant death toll. The IUCN has listed the pigeye shark overall as vulnerable, while noting that its rarity may render it susceptible to overfishing. In KwaZulu-Natal, South Africa, small numbers of pigeye sharks are caught in shark nets set up to protect beaches. The catch rate and the average size of sharks caught both decreased between 1978 and 1998, leading to concerns that the local population may be depleted. Thus, the IUCN has given this species a regional assessment of Near Threatened in the southwestern Indian Ocean.
