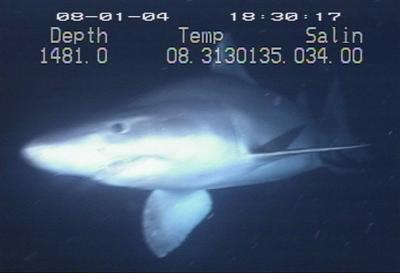
- Smalltooth sand tiger (O. ferox)
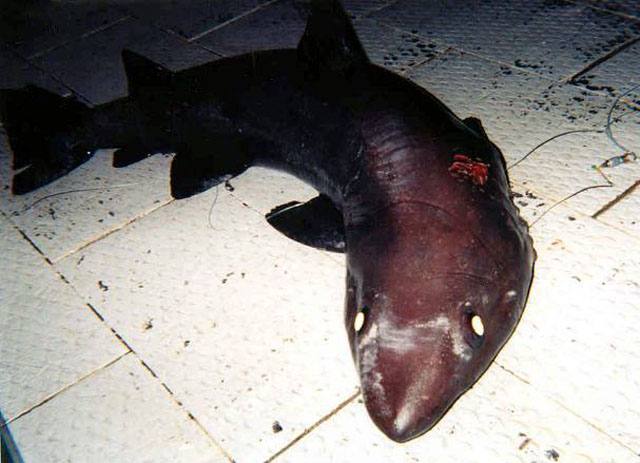
- Bigeye sand tiger (O. noronhai)

Scientific classification
- Kingdom: Animalia
- Phylum: Chordata
- Class: Chondrichthyes
- Subclass: Elasmobranchii
- Division: Selachii
- Order: Lamniformes
- Family: Odontaspididae
- Genus: Odontaspis; Agassiz, 1838

Type species
- Carcharias ferox Risso, 1826

= Odontaspis =

Odontaspis Temporal range: Cretaceous - Present

Genus of sharks

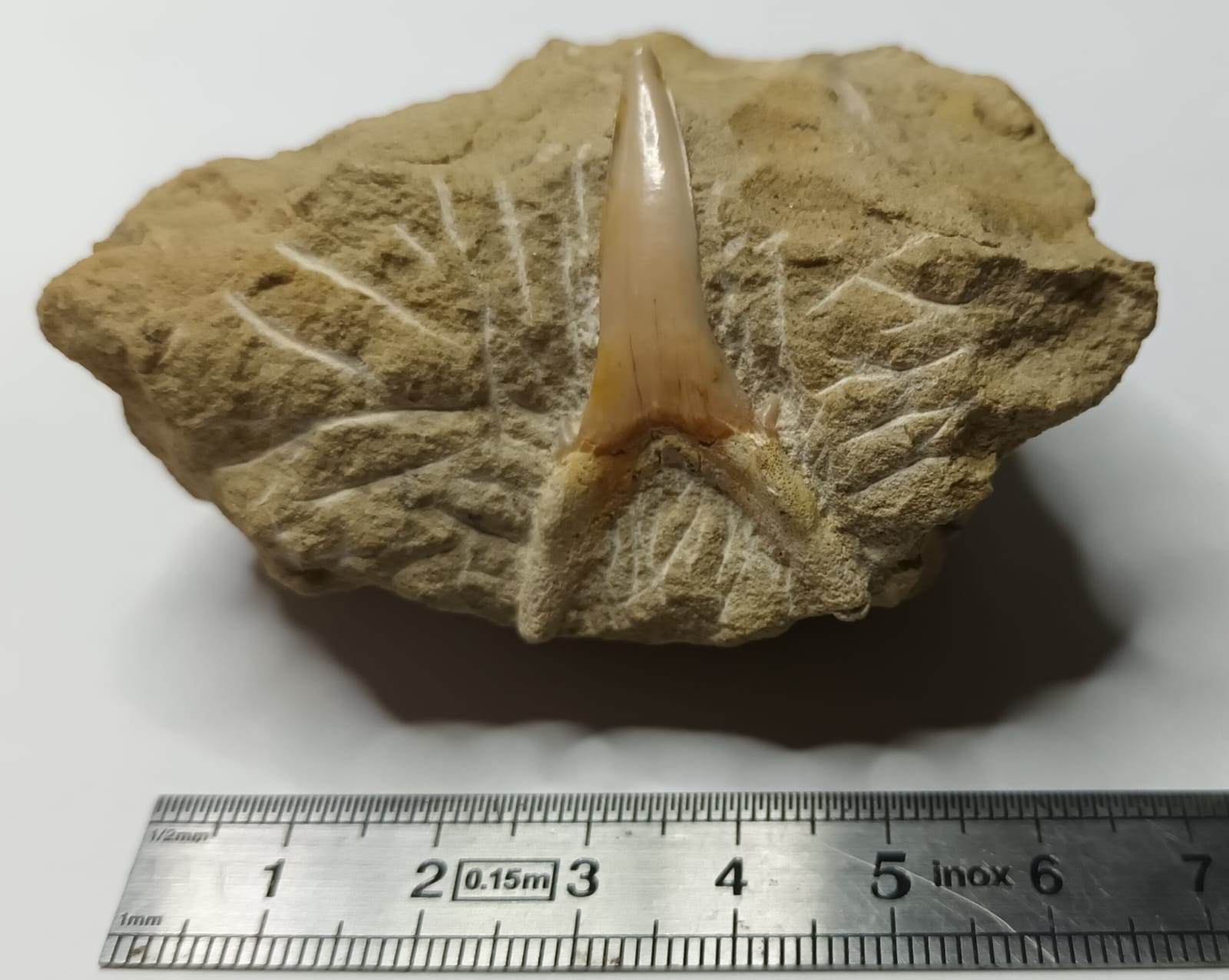
Fossil tooth of Odontaspis acutissima from the lower Burdigalian of Hérault, France. Max Rouger Collection.

Odontaspis (from Greek: ὀδούς odoús 'tooth') and Greek: ἀσπίς aspís 'shield') is a genus of sand shark with two extant species.

== Description ==
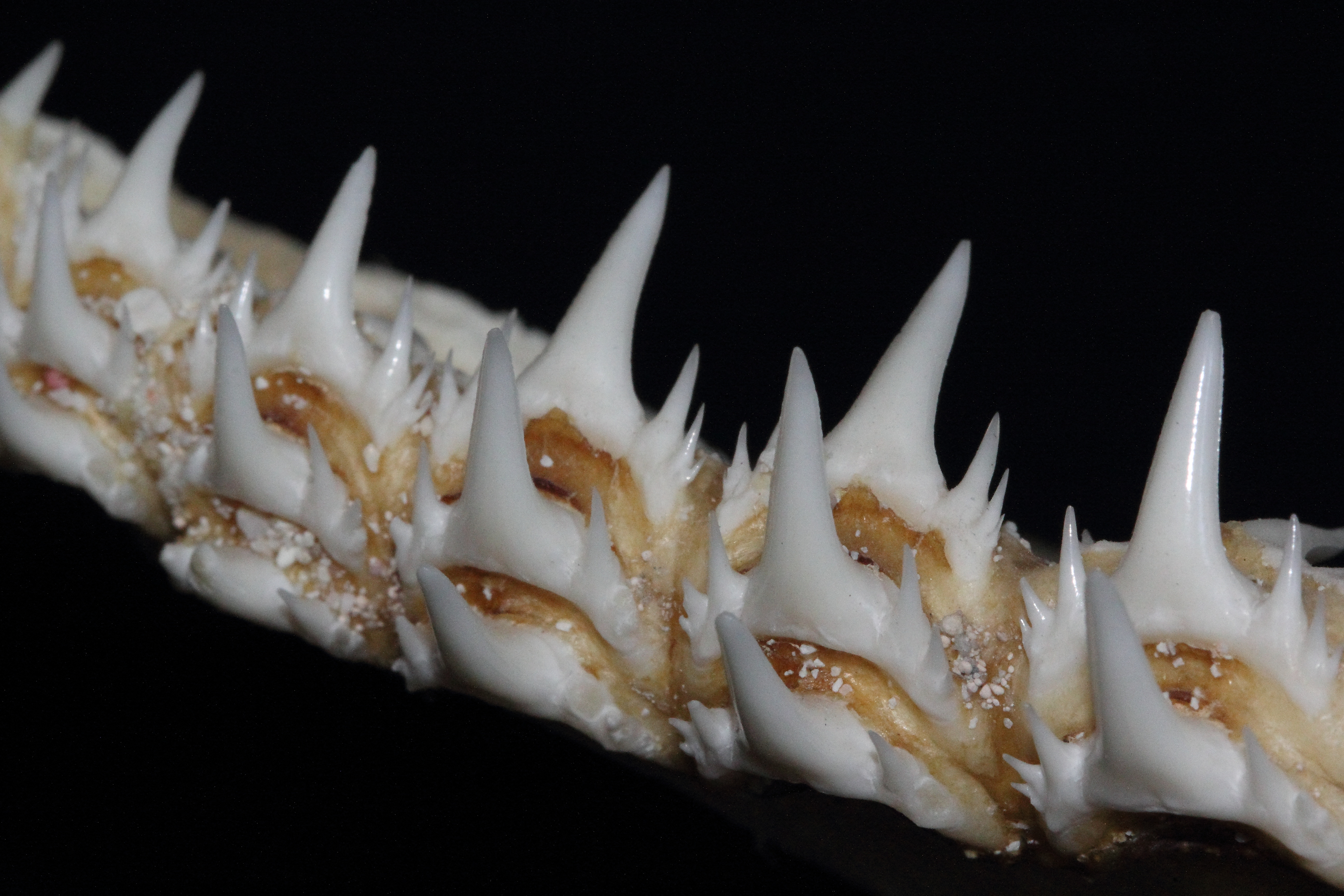
The prominent cusps of one Odontaspis species (O. ferox).

Bigeye sand tigers can reach a length of about 3.6 metres (12 ft) and smalltooth sand tigers of about 4.1 m.

They are large-bodied sharks with long, conical snouts, broad-based dorsal and anal fins, and an asymmetrical caudal fin with a strong lower lobe.

Their teeth are large, with prominent narrow cusps.

They are distinguished from the similar genus Carcharias by the absence of crushing posterior teeth.

These bottom dwelling, deepwater sharks can be found in temperate and tropical waters of all the oceans.

== Extant species ==
- Odontaspis ferox (A. Risso, 1810) (smalltooth sand tiger)
- Odontaspis noronhai (Maul, 1955) (bigeye sand tiger)

== Extinct species ==
Extinct species within this genus include:

- Odontaspis aculeatus Capetta & Case, 1975
- Odontaspis speyeri (Dartevelle & Casier, 1943)
- Odontaspis winkleri Leriche, 1905

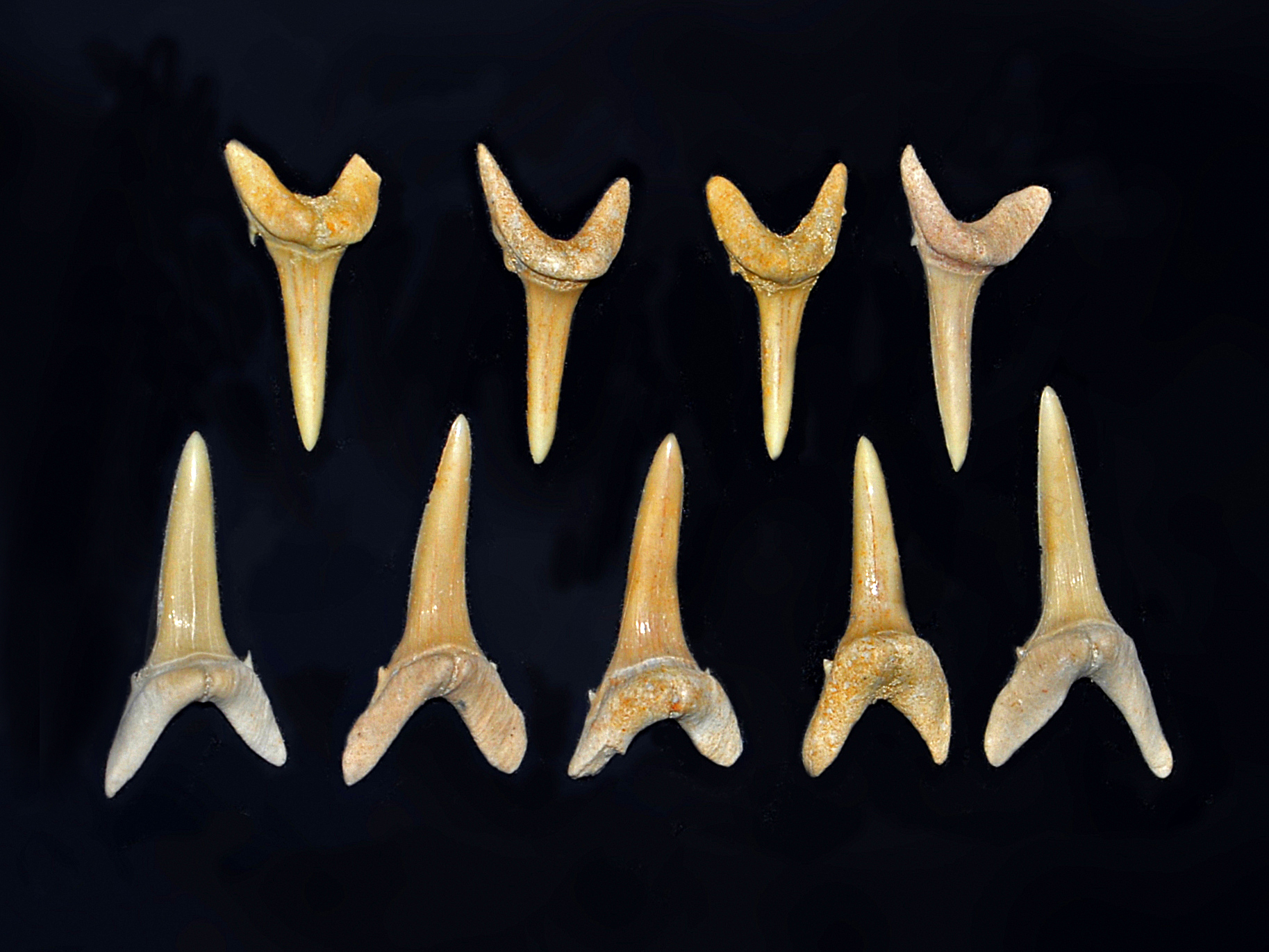
Fossil teeth of Odontaspis winkleri from Khouribga (Morocco), 55-45 mya

Fossils of Odontaspis have been found all over the world. These extinct sand sharks lived from the Cretaceous to the Quaternary periods (from 136.4 to 0.012 Ma). Fossils of these fishes have been found worldwide.

== See also ==
- List of prehistoric cartilaginous fish
