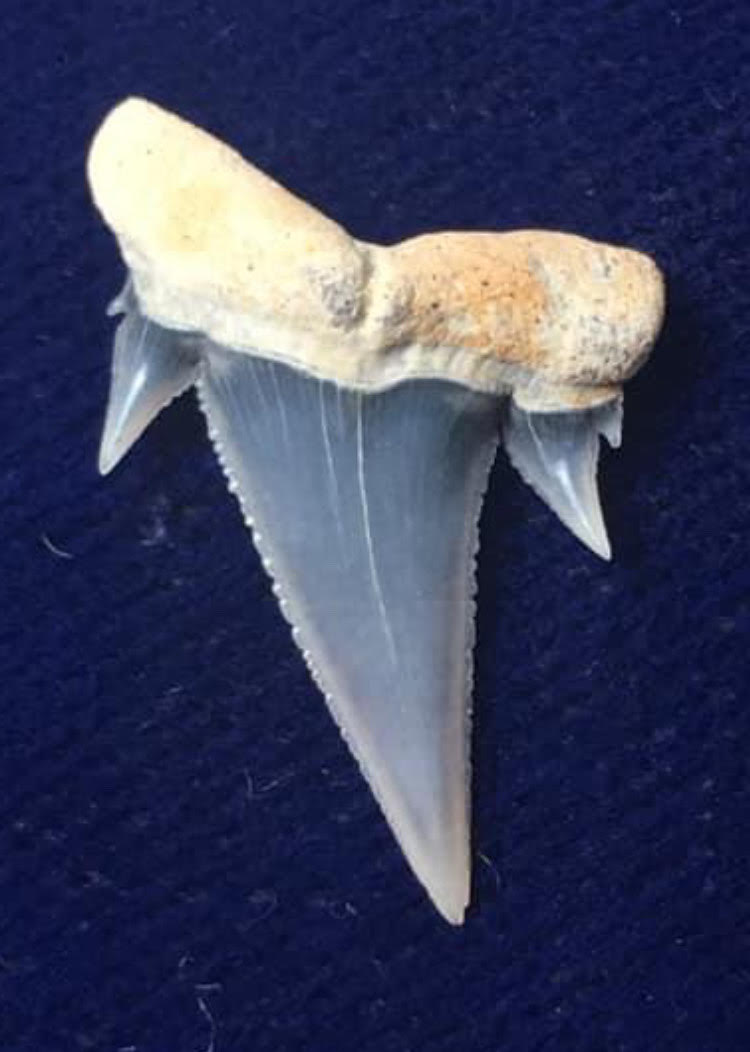
- Carcharoides totuserratus teeth from Argentina

Scientific classification
- Kingdom: Animalia
- Phylum: Chordata
- Class: Chondrichthyes
- Subclass: Elasmobranchii
- Division: Selachii
- Order: Lamniformes
- Family: Lamnidae
- Genus: †Carcharoides; Ameghino, 1901

Species
- †C. catticus Philippi 1846; †C. lipsiensis (Reinecke et al., 2018); †C. tenuidens? Chapman 1913; †C. totuserratus Ameghino 1901

= Carcharoides =

Carcharoides Temporal range: Rupelian–Langhian

Extinct genus of Mackerel shark

Carcharoides is an extinct genus of mackerel shark which lived during the Oligocene and Miocene epochs. It is a widespread genus, known from specimens in North and South America, Europe, Africa, and Australia. It is most common in the European portion of its range, being comparatively uncommon in other places. It is only known from isolated teeth, which are relatively delicate.

== Species and affinities ==
There are three species, C. catticus, C. totuserratus, and C. lipsiensis. C. catticus is much more common and present from the early Oligocene until the middle Miocene. C. totuserratus is a rarer serrated species which exists in the early Miocene. C. tenuidens is a junior synonym of C. totuserratus once applied to teeth from the late oligocene of Australia. Possible transitional teeth from C. catticus to C. totuserratus are known from the late Oligocene Chandler Bridge Formation of South Carolina. C. lipsiensis was described in 2018 from the Rupelian-aged Böhlen Formation of Germany. It is unserrated.

There is debate over the placement of the position of this genus within the order Lamniformes. It has been traditionally considered a gracile member of the family Lamnidae, but some recent authors have suggested it is a robust member of the family Odontaspididae. Either way, the species is an example of convergent evolution. The lack of associated material makes confident placement difficult. Purdy (2001) synonymized this genus with Triaenodon but subsequent authors have refuted this.
