= USS Tiger Shark =

No ship of the United States Navy has ever borne the name USS Tiger Shark or Tigershark, but the name is popular for fictional submarines (although real submarines have been named USS Shark).

- USS Tiger Shark is the setting for the 1951 movie, Submarine Command starring William Holden as a submarine captain haunted by a life and death decision made during wartime.
- The 1959 sci-fi movie The Atomic Submarine is about a submarine named Tiger Shark.
- USS Tigershark is featured in the 1995 episode of the television series JAG.
- USS Tiger Shark is the setting for the 2002 suspense/horror movie Below.

== See also ==
- List of fictional ships
- Ice Station Zebra (film) for a fictional U.S. Navy submarine named USS Tigerfish.
