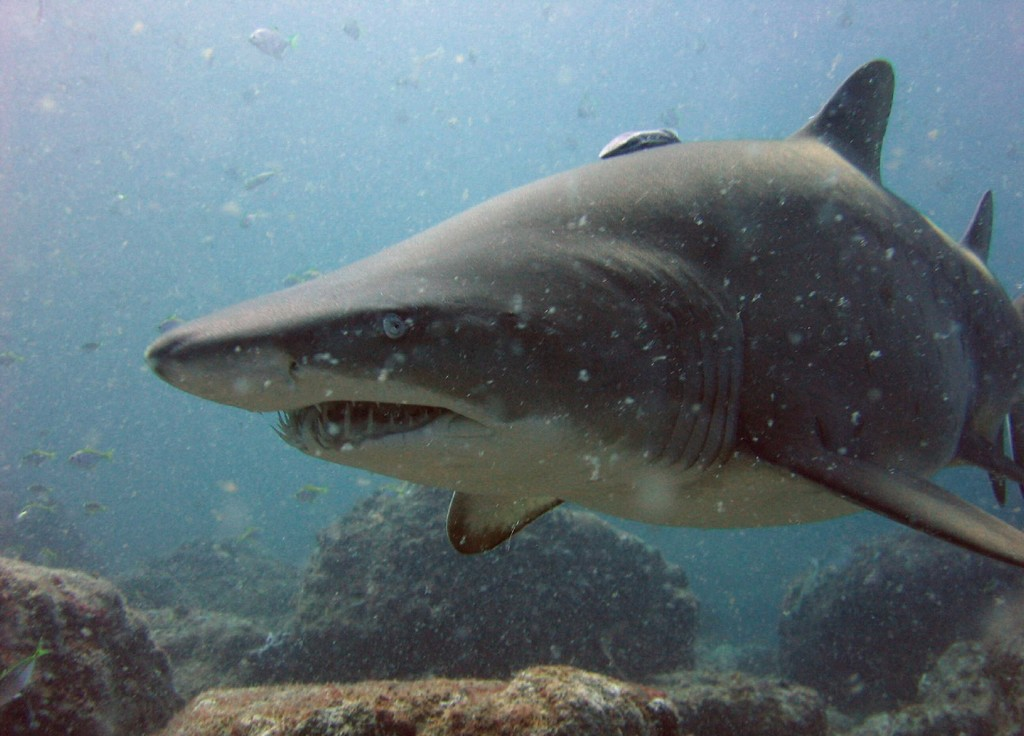
- Sand tiger shark (Carcharias taurus), one of the surviving members of the genus

Scientific classification
- Kingdom: Animalia
- Phylum: Chordata
- Class: Chondrichthyes
- Subclass: Elasmobranchii
- Division: Selachii
- Order: Lamniformes
- Family: Carchariidae
- Genus: Carcharias; Rafinesque, 1810

= Carcharias =

Carcharias Temporal range: Late Cretaceous to present

Genus of sharks

Carcharias, also known as sand tiger sharks, is a genus of mackerel sharks belonging to the family Carchariidae, of which it is the only extant member. Once bearing many prehistoric species, all have gone extinct with the exception of the critically endangered sand tiger shark.

== Description ==
Carcharias are 2.5 m (8 ft 2 in) long on average. The maximum weight of the shark is 158.8 kg (350 lb).

Differentiating species of sharks is usually done by locating and measuring their fins. The tail is one third of the entire body size. The second dorsal fin and the anal fin of Carcharias are large and about equal in size. The pectoral fins are triangular and slightly larger than the dorsal fins. The teeth are long and narrow with sharp points, and smooth with no ridges.

== Diet ==
Carcharias species are generalist predators that hunt bony fish, small sharks, rays, squids, crabs and lobsters.

== Habitat ==
Sand tiger sharks are found in the Pacific, Atlantic and Indian oceans. They live in water depths ranging from 0 to 190 m (0 to 623 ft), and are commonly found in sandy surf zones.

== Species ==
With the Ancient Greek name καρχαρίας (karkharías) literally translating to "shark", many extant species were placed into this genus before being moved to different genera and orders.

=== Extant species ===
Based on Eschmeyer's Catalog of Fishes:

- Carcharias taurus Rafinesque, 1810 (sand tiger shark)

=== Species previously described in this genus ===
- Carcharias acutidens Rüppell, 1837 (accepted as Negaprion acutidens)
- Carcharias borneensis Seale, 1910 (accepted as Carcharhinus sealei)
- Carcharias brachyrhynchos Bleeker, 1859 (accepted as Carcharhinus amboinensis)
- Carcharias brevipinna Müller & Henle, 1839 (accepted as Carcharhinus brevipinna)
- Carcharias falciformis Müller & Henle, 1839 (accepted as Carcharhinus falciformis)
- Carcharias fronto Jordan & Gilbert, 1882 (accepted as Negaprion brevirostris)
- Carcharias hemiodon Müller & Henle, 1839 (accepted as Carcharhinus hemiodon)
- Carcharias sealei Pietschmann, 1913 (accepted as Carcharhinus sealei)

=== Extinct species ===
Extinct species within this genus lived from the Cretaceous period to the Quaternary period (from 99.7 to 0.012 Ma). Fossils have been found all over the world, especially in the Miocene and Oligocene sediments of Europe, the United States and Australia, in the Eocene of Egypt, Europe and the United States, as well as in the Cretaceous of Australia, Canada, the United States, Europe and Africa. Species from the fossil record include:

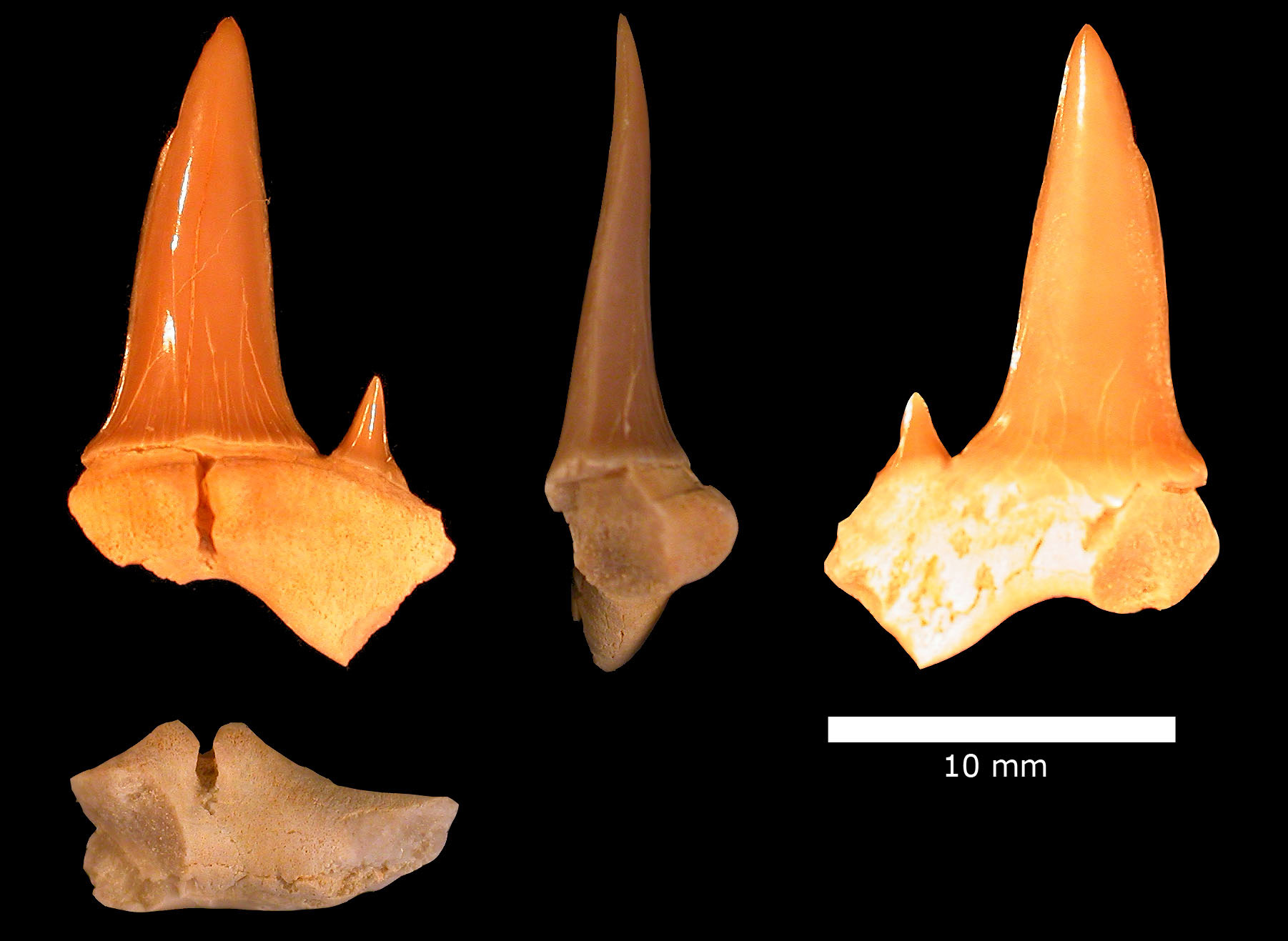
Fossil teeth of Carcharias holmdelensis from Israel, Upper Cretaceous

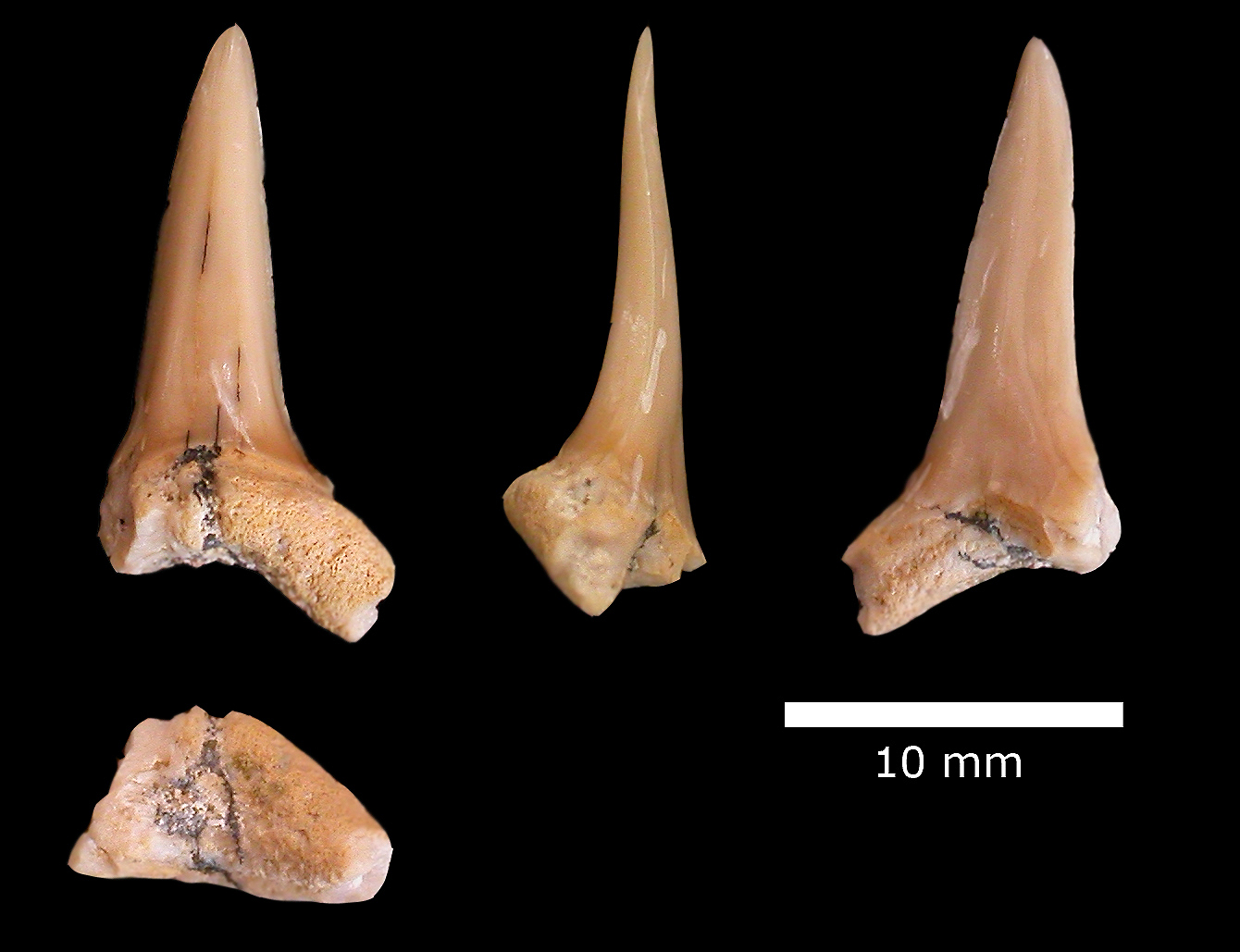
Fossil teeth of Carcharias samhammeri from Israel, Upper Cretaceous

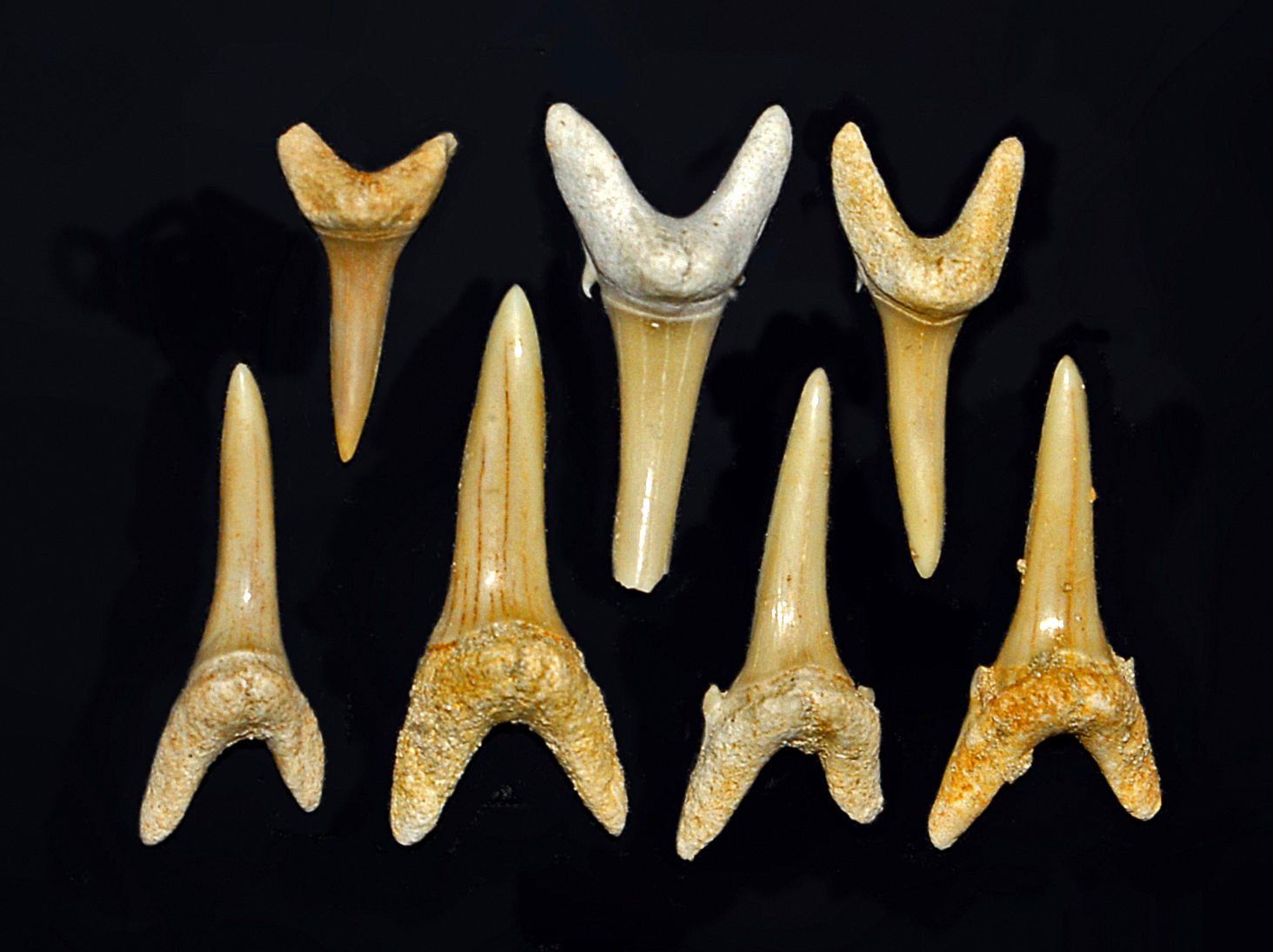
Fossil teeth of Carcharias tingitana from Morocco, Paleogene

=== Cretaceous species ===
- Carcharias tenuiplicatus
- Carcharias holmdelensis Maastrichtian
- Carcharias samhammeri Late Cretaceous
- Carcharias heathi Late Cretaceous

=== Paleogene species ===
- Carcharias acutissima (Agassiz, 1844) - Late Eocene: Fossil replaced as Carcharias sp.
- Carcharias atlasi
- Carcharias hopei (Agassiz, 1843) Late Palaeocene-Eocene: Now more known as Hypotodus verticalis.
- Carcharias koerti (Stromer, 1905)
- Carcharias robusta? (Leriche, 1921) - Early Eocene: Current called as Jaekelotodus robustus.
- Carcharias teretidens - maybe placed into its own genus as Sylvestrilamia teretidens
- Carcharias teretidens (White, 1931), - Late Palaeocene - Eocene
- Carcharias tingitana (Arambourg, 1952)
- Carcharias vincenti (Woodward, 1899): Considered a junior synonym of Brachycarcharias lerichei.
- Carcharias whitei (Arambourg, 1952) - Paleocene: Probably not belongs to Carcharias genus.

=== Neogene ===
- Carcharias acutissima (Agassiz, 1843), Oligocene - Pliocene: Considered a nomen dubium.
- Carcharias reticulata (Probst, 1879), Oligocene - Miocene: Also placed in Odontaspis genus.
- Carcharias cuspidata (Agassiz, 1843), Oligocene - Miocene: Also known as Araloselachus.
- Carcharias taurus Rafinesque, 1810, Pliocene - Present
- Carcharias sp. - unidentified but maybe similar to the Carcharias contortidens as described by Agassiz in 1843, from the Miocene.
