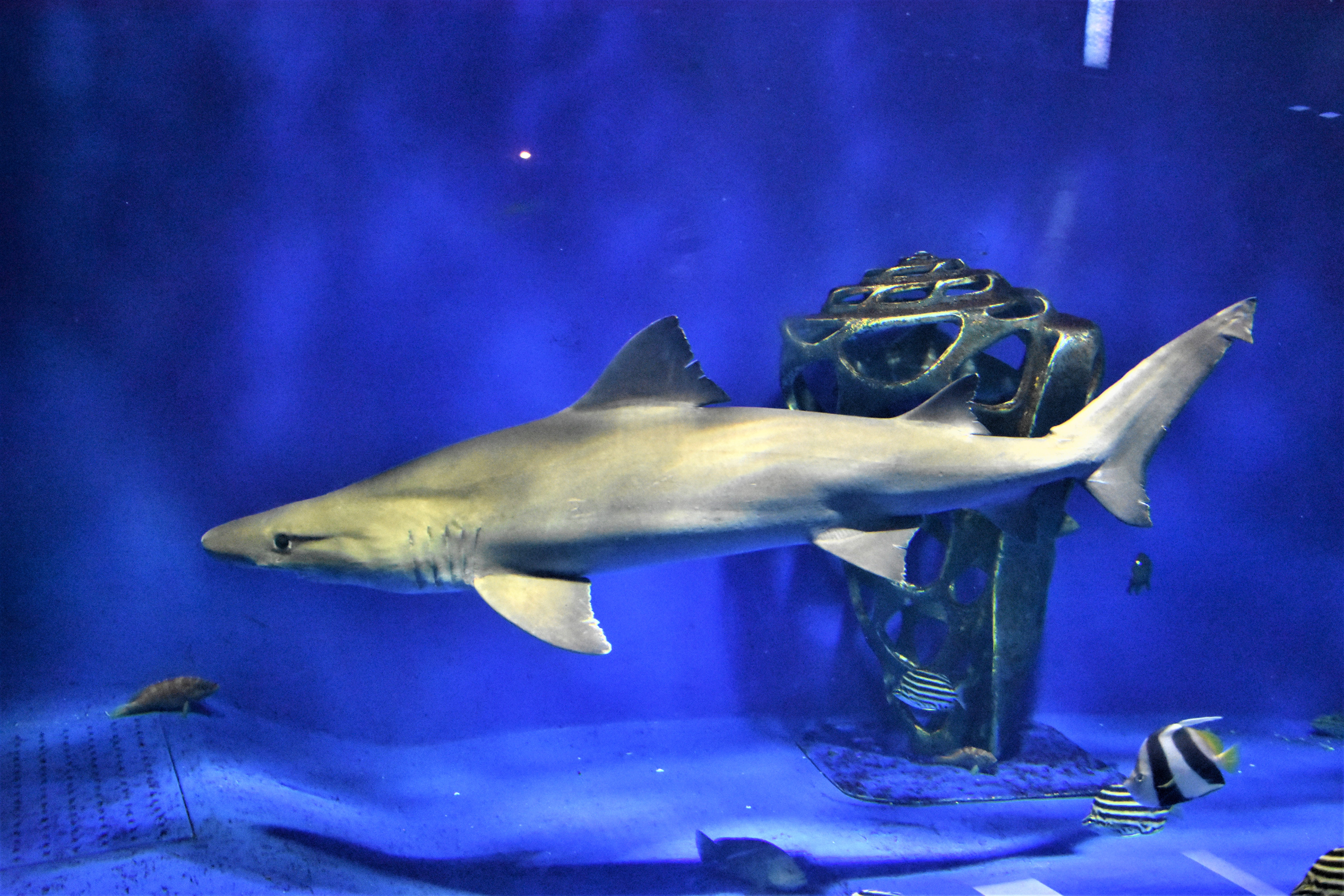
- Smalltooth sand tiger in captivity

Conservation status
- Endangered (IUCN 3.1)

Scientific classification
- Kingdom: Animalia
- Phylum: Chordata
- Class: Chondrichthyes
- Subclass: Elasmobranchii
- Division: Selachii
- Order: Lamniformes
- Family: Odontaspididae
- Genus: Odontaspis
- Species: O. ferox

Binomial name
- Odontaspis ferox (A. Risso, 1810)
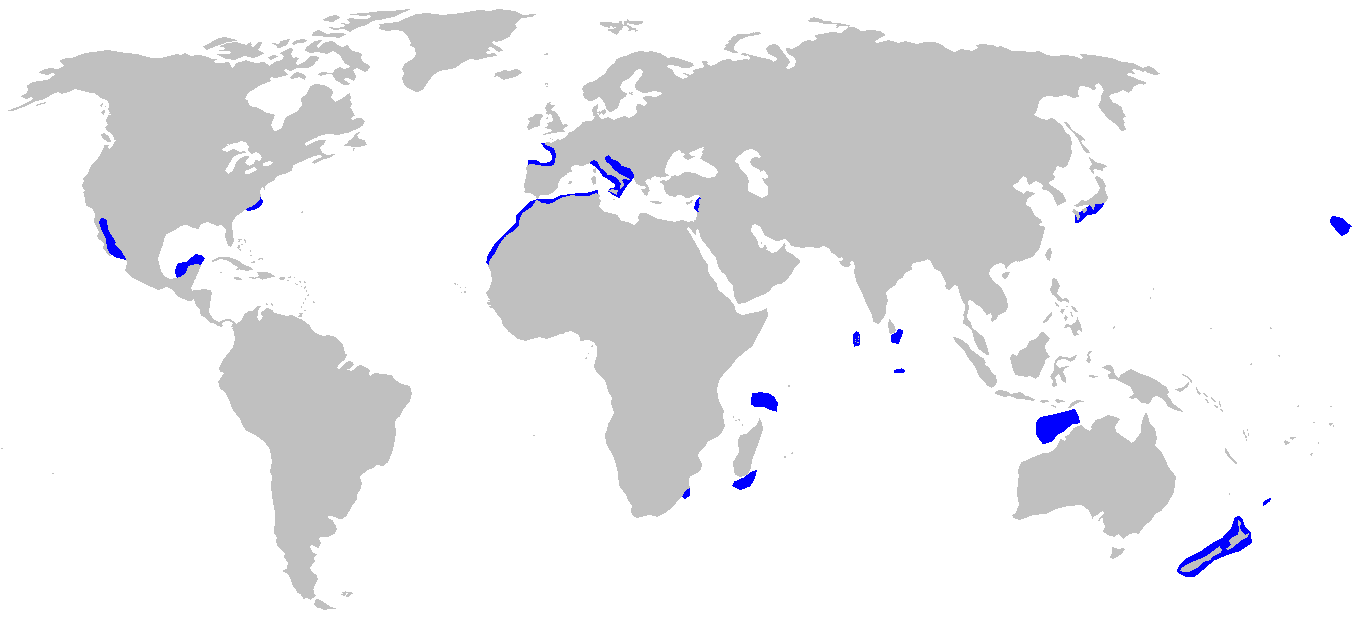
- Range of the smalltooth sand tiger

Synonyms
- Odontaspis herbsti Whitley, 1950; Squalus ferox A. Risso, 1810

= Smalltooth sand tiger =

Species of shark

The smalltooth sand tiger or bumpytail ragged-tooth (Odontaspis ferox) is a species of mackerel shark in the family Odontaspididae, with a patchy but worldwide distribution in tropical and warm temperate waters. They usually inhabit deepwater rocky habitats, though they are occasionally encountered in shallow water, and have been known to return to the same location year after year. This rare species is often mistaken for the much more common sand tiger shark (Carcharias taurus), from which it can be distinguished by its first dorsal fin, which is larger than the second and placed further forward. It grows to at least 5.2 m (17 ft) in length. They have also been recently sighted in Irish and English waters.

Very little is known of the biology and behavior of the smalltooth sand tiger. It is an active predator of invertebrates, cartilaginous fishes, and bony fishes from the benthic zone. This species is thought to be ovoviviparous with oophagous embryos like other mackerel sharks. In contrast to its formidable size and appearance, this shark is harmless, having never been known to behave aggressively towards humans. Concern exists that its numbers are declining due to human activities in the Mediterranean and elsewhere, though existing data are inadequate for a full assessment of its conservation status.

== Taxonomy and phylogeny ==
The smalltooth sand tiger was originally described as Squalus ferox by Italian-French naturalist Antoine Risso in 1810, based on a specimen from Nice, France. In 1950, Gilbert Percy Whitley described O. herbsti from Australian specimens, separating them from O. ferox on the basis of dentition and the absence of spots. Leonard Compagno synonymized the two species in 1984, as subsequently discovered Pacific specimens had blurred Whitley's distinguishing characters. The specific epithet ferox is Latin for "fierce". Other common names for this shark include blue nurse shark, fierce shark, Herbst's nurse shark, and sand tiger shark.

A phylogenetic study based on mitochondrial DNA, performed by Naylor et al. in 1997, suggests that the smalltooth sand tiger and its relative, the bigeye sand tiger (O. noronhai), are more closely related to the thresher sharks than to the grey nurse shark, to which it bears a strong resemblance. If true, this would indicate that the similarities between this species and the grey nurse shark arose as the result of convergent evolution. Fossil teeth belonging to the smalltooth sand tiger have been found from Lower Pliocene from 5.3 to 3.6 million years ago (Mya) in deposits in Italy and Venezuela.

== Description ==
The smalltooth sand tiger has a bulky body with a long, bulbous, slightly flattened snout. The eyes are medium-sized, with large, round pupils (as opposed to slit-like in the grey nurse shark), and lack nictitating membranes.

The mouth is large and filled with projecting teeth. Each tooth has a narrow, tall central cusp flanked by two or three pairs of lateral cusplets. Some 48–56 tooth rows are in the upper jaw and 36–46 tooth rows are in the lower jaw; the front large teeth in the upper jaw are separated from the lateral teeth by two to five intermediate teeth.

The fins are broad-based and angular in shape. The first dorsal fin is larger than the second and placed closer to the pectoral fins than the pelvic fins. The caudal fin is strongly asymmetrical with the upper lobe much longer than the lower. The coloration is gray to gray-brown above and lighter below. Juveniles are uniform in color with darker fin margins, while adults often exhibit dark spots or blotches that vary widely in pattern, size, and density. Coloration also appears to vary by region, with some individuals from the Mediterranean displaying a patchy, "piebald" pattern. The smalltooth sand tiger attains a maximum length of 5.2 m (17 ft) per Kukuev & Batal'yants, 2019 and a maximum weight of 289 kg (637 lb). There are unconfirmed reports of much larger individuals from Malpelo Island off Colombia.

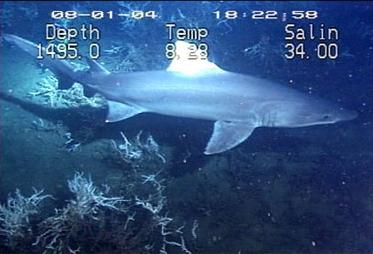
The smalltooth sand tiger has unequal-sized dorsal fins.

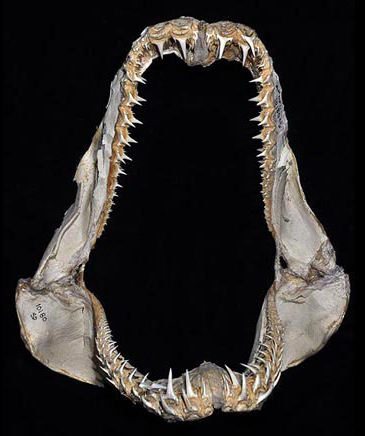
Jaws

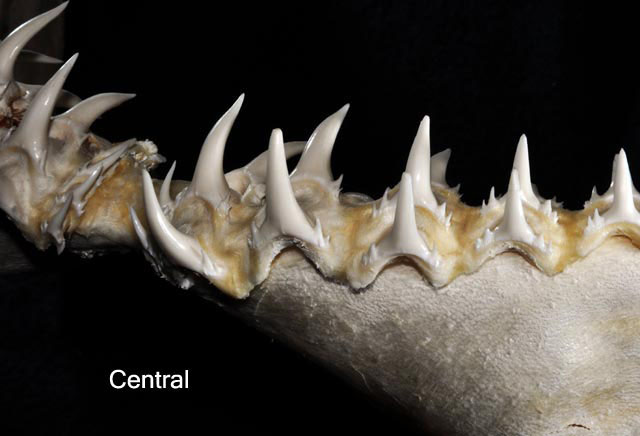
Central lower teeth

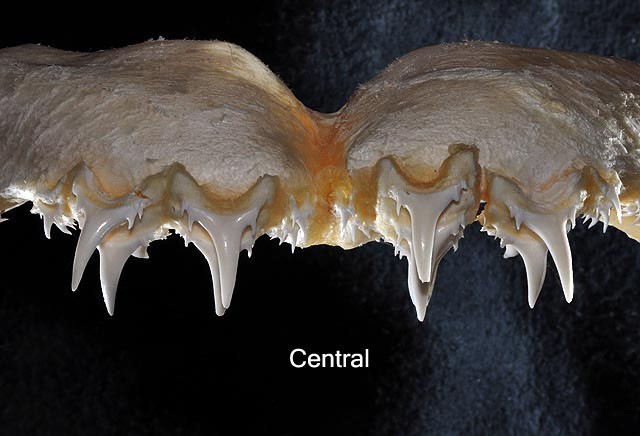
Central upper teeth

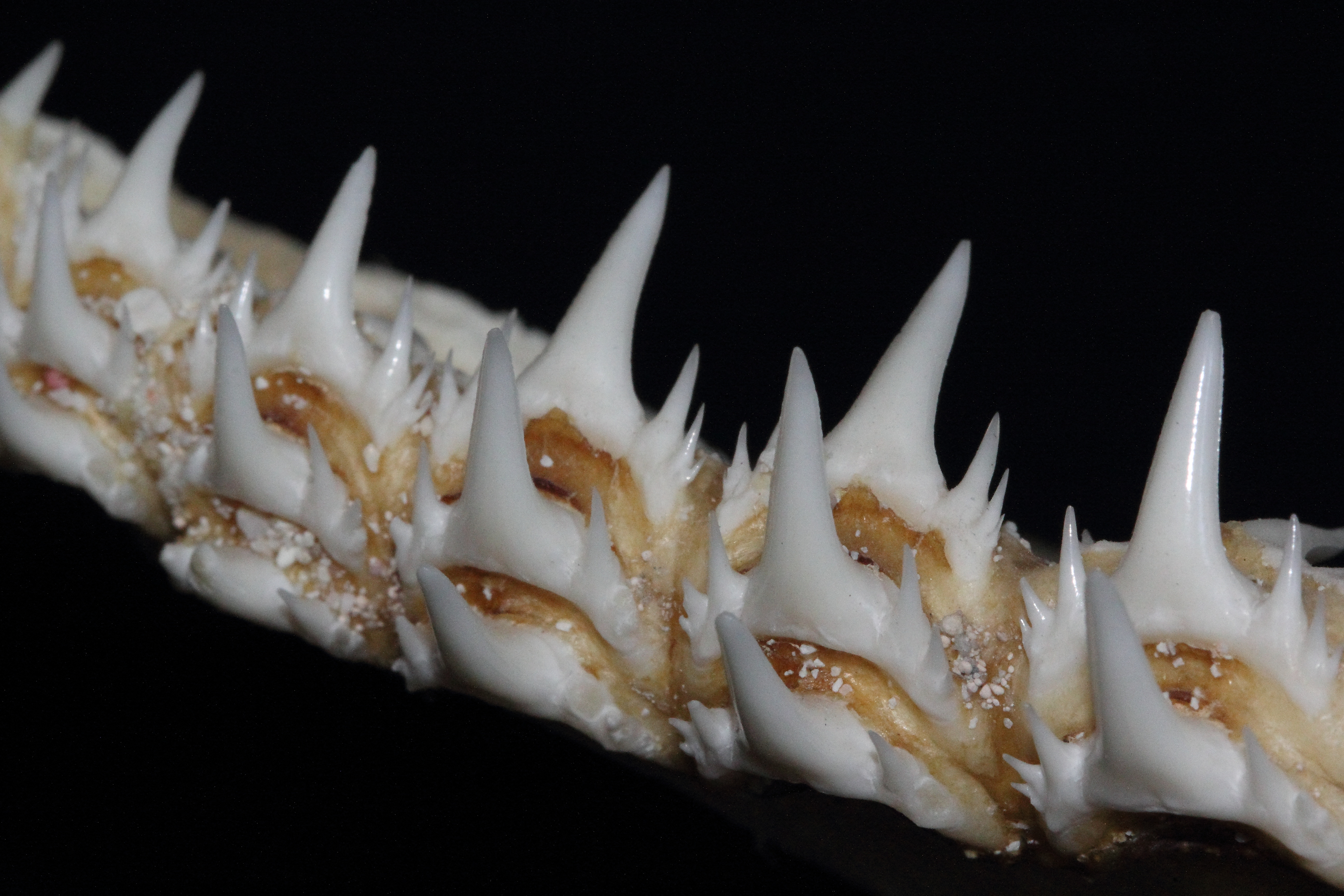
Lateral teeth

== Distribution and habitat ==
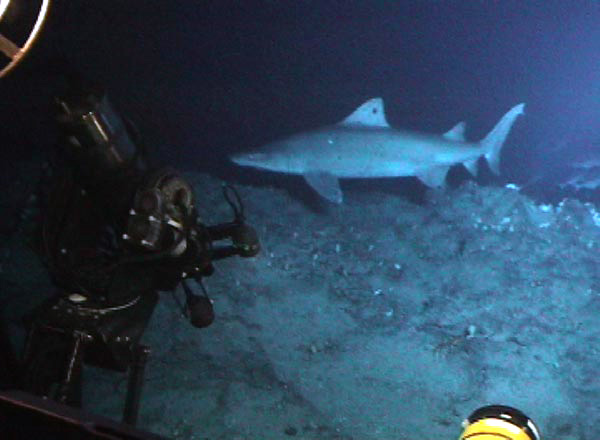
Smalltooth sand tiger in the Flower Garden Banks National Marine Sanctuary, Florida

Smalltooth sand tigers have been caught at widely scattered locations throughout the world, indicating a possibly circumtropical distribution. In the eastern Atlantic Ocean, it is known from the Bay of Biscay south to Morocco, including the Mediterranean Sea, the Azores, and the Canary Islands. In March 2023, the species was also found in The Solent after a dead smalltooth sand tiger washed ashore at Lepe, Hampshire, and the following month a 14-foot (4.3 m) specimen was found in County Wexford, Ireland. In the western Atlantic, it has been reported from off North Carolina and Florida (USA), the Yucatan Peninsula (Mexico), Fernando de Noronha (Brazil) and even, much more recently, from Malpelo Island near Colombia. It occurs throughout the Indian Ocean, from South Africa, Madagascar, and Tanzania in the west to the Maldives and the Southwest Indian Ridge in the east. In the northern Pacific, it is known from off Japan, Hawaii, California, and in the southern Pacific it is known from New Caledonia, eastern Australia, and New Zealand. In New Zealand, this species can be found off the coasts of the Bay of Plenty, New Plymouth, and Hawkes Bay. It has also been filmed near Raoul Island.

Typically regarded as a deepwater species, smalltooth sand tigers have been caught down to 880 m (2,890 ft). They are usually found near the bottom in rocky, boulder-strewn regions on continental shelves and the upper continental slope, as well as around submarine ridges and mountains. The species has been reported near the drop-offs of rocky or coral reefs and in the upper layers of the open ocean. In the Mediterranean, smalltooth sand tigers occur at depths less than 250 m (820 ft), including at depths accessible to divers. They have been seen swimming over sandy flats at Cocos Island and Fernando de Noronha. The temperature range favored by this species is 6–20 °C (43–68 °F); in hot climates, they are found below the thermocline in cooler water.

== Biology and ecology ==
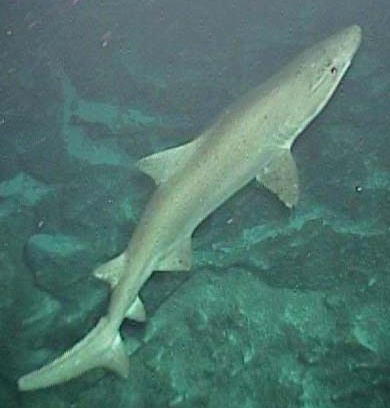
Smalltooth sand tiger at the Northampton Seamount: In the open ocean, this species is strongly associated with submarine ridges and seamounts.

The smalltooth sand tiger is a strong-swimming shark that may be encountered singly or in aggregations of up to five individuals. Catch records suggest this species may cover long distances in oceanic waters along underwater ridges or "hopping" between seamounts. It has a very large, oily liver, which allows it to maintain neutral buoyancy in the water column with minimal effort. At a location called "Shark Point" off Beirut, Lebanon, small groups of smalltooth sand tigers appear every summer on rocky reefs at a depth of 30–45 m (98–148 ft). The same individuals have been documented returning to this site year after year. Their purpose there is unknown, being speculated to relate to mating. When confronted, these sharks have been observed to stall, gape their mouths, turn around, and shake their tails towards the perceived threat.

Adult smalltooth sand tigers have no known predators, though they are bitten by cookiecutter sharks (Isistius brasiliensis). A known parasite is the tapeworm Lithobothrium gracile, which infests the shark's spiral valve intestine. The carcass of a 3.7-m-long (12.1 ft) female found off Fuerteventura in the Canary Islands contained a number of snubnosed eels (Simenchelys parasitica) inside her heart, body cavity, and back muscles. Whether the eels contributed to the shark's death is unknown.

=== Feeding ===
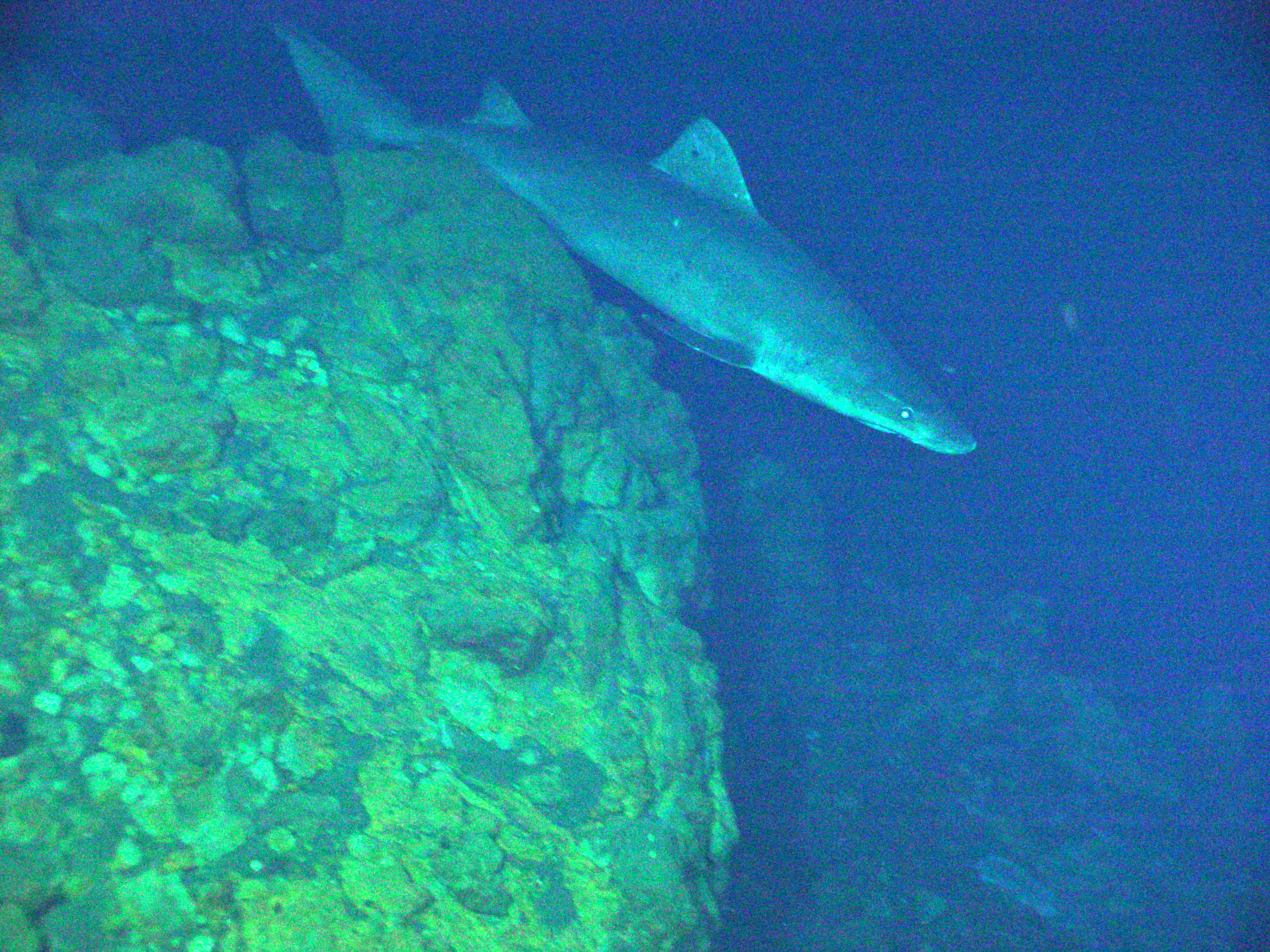
A smalltooth sand tiger at a hydrothermal vent on the Kasuga-2 submarine volcano: Smaller individuals such as this tend to remain in deeper water.

Compared to the grey nurse shark, the dentition of the smalltooth sand tiger is less robust and lacks specialized cutting and crushing teeth, suggesting that it tends to tackle smaller prey. The diet of the smalltooth sand tiger consists of bottom-dwelling bony fishes such as rockfish (Sebastes spp.), invertebrates such as squid, shrimp, and possibly marine isopods, and cartilaginous fishes including rays and chimaeras. The largest known prey item taken by this species was a 1.3-m-long (4.3 ft) kitefin shark (Dalatias licha), found inside the stomach of a 2.9-m-long (9.5 ft) male from New Caledonia.

=== Life history ===
No pregnant smalltooth sand tigers have ever been found; this species is presumed to be ovoviviparous as in other mackerel sharks. Villaviencio-Garayzar (1996) described a 3.6 m (12 ft) female from the Gulf of California that contained "hundreds of ova" in her right ovary, which would support the embryos being oophagous. Whether the embryos also cannibalize each other as in the grey nurse shark is unknown. The size at birth is estimated to be 1.0–1.1 m (3.3–3.6 ft). With a few recorded exceptions, juveniles are found in deep water and only adults are present above a depth of 200 m (660 ft); this may serve to reduce predation on young individuals by large, shallow-water predators such as the great white shark (Carcharodon carcharias). Males mature at a length of 2.0–2.5 m (6.6–8.2 ft) and females at a length of 3.0–3.5 m (9.8–11.5 ft). Faint scars seen on some individuals may be related to courtship.

== Human interactions ==
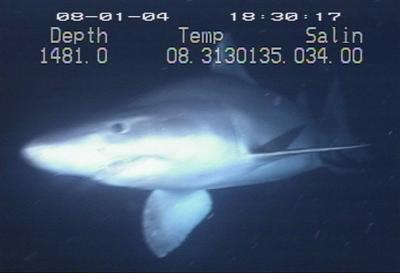
An individual of O. ferox observed in the Gulf of Mexico

Encounters with divers have shown that, despite their size, smalltooth sand tigers are docile and do not react aggressively even when closely approached. This species is taken as bycatch in gillnets and bottom trawls, and on longlines; most captures occur in the Mediterranean and off Japan. It is usually discarded when caught, except in Japan, where the meat is consumed (though considered very inferior to the grey nurse shark) and the liver oil is used. The fins, jaws, and cartilage are also of value.

Discoveries, beginning in the 1970s, of smalltooth sand tigers in shallow water have raised urgent conservation concerns, as this species is apparently more vulnerable to human activity than previously believed. At present, data are insufficient for the International Union for Conservation of Nature to assess the worldwide conservation status of this species. It has been assessed as vulnerable in Australian waters, due to a decline over 50% in catches off New South Wales since the 1970s. In June 2018, the New Zealand Department of Conservation classified the smalltooth sand tiger as "At Risk – Naturally Uncommon" with the qualifier "Threatened Overseas" under the New Zealand Threat Classification System.

Populations of this species in the Mediterranean are also believed to have declined, due to a combination of habitat degradation, overfishing, pollution, and human disturbance. The smalltooth sand tiger has been protected by the Australian government since 1984; this came about concurrently with protection for the grey nurse shark, which had been decimated in Australian waters, so as to prevent any claims of confusing one species for the other. However, these regulations have proven difficult to enforce.
