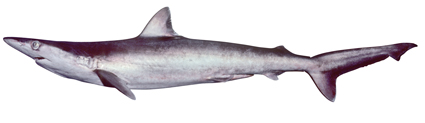

Conservation status
- Near Threatened (IUCN 3.1)

Scientific classification
- Kingdom: Animalia
- Phylum: Chordata
- Class: Chondrichthyes
- Subclass: Elasmobranchii
- Division: Selachii
- Order: Carcharhiniformes
- Family: Carcharhinidae
- Genus: Carcharhinus
- Species: C. macloti

Binomial name
- Carcharhinus macloti (J. P. Müller & Henle, 1839)
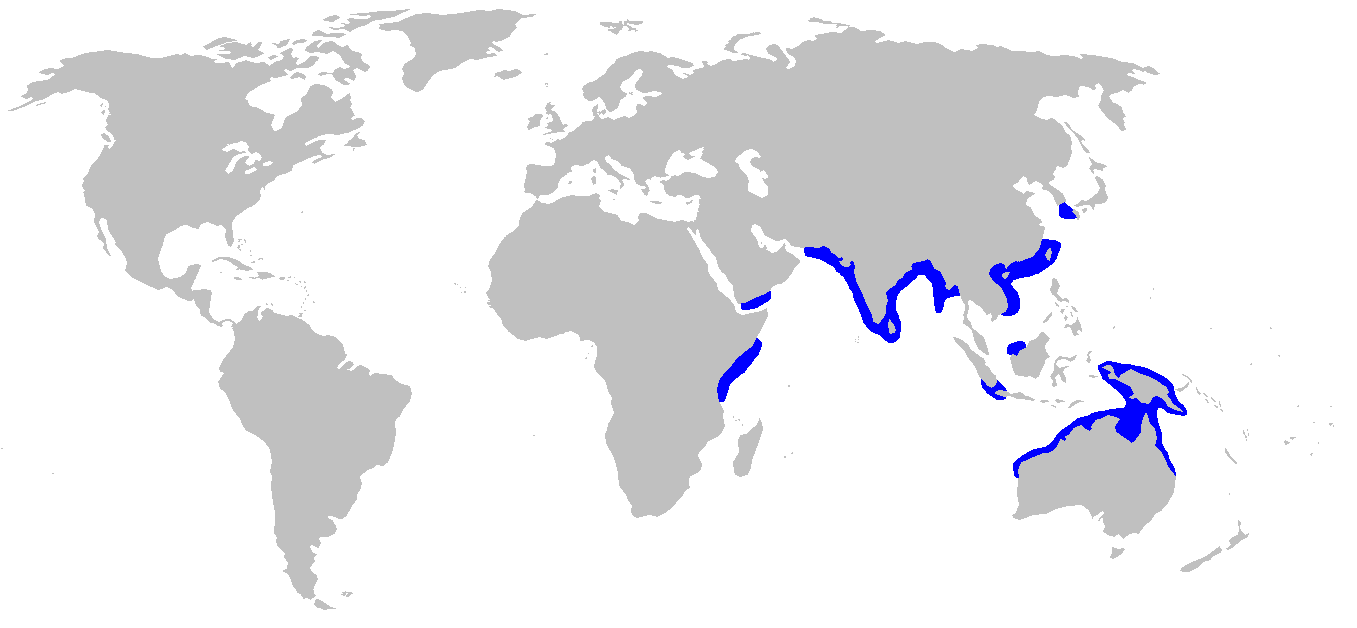
- Range of the hardnose shark

Synonyms
- Carcharias macloti Müller & Henle, 1839

= Hardnose shark =

Hardnose shark Temporal range: Early Miocene to present

Species of shark

The hardnose shark (Carcharhinus macloti) is a species of requiem shark, in the family Carcharhinidae, so named because of the heavily calcified cartilages in its snout. A small bronze-coloured shark reaching a length of 1.1 m (3.6 ft), it has a slender body and a long, pointed snout. Its two modestly sized dorsal fins have distinctively elongated rear tips. The hardnose shark is widely distributed in the western Indo-Pacific, from Kenya to southern China and northern Australia. It inhabits warm, shallow waters close to shore.

Common and gregarious, the hardnose shark is a predator of bony fishes, cephalopods, and crustaceans. This species is viviparous, with the growing embryos sustained to term via a placental connection to their mother. Females have a biennial reproductive cycle and bear litters of one or two pups after a twelve-month gestation period. The hardnose shark is fished for meat throughout its range and, given its low reproductive rate, the International Union for Conservation of Nature (IUCN) has listed it as Near Threatened.

== Taxonomy ==
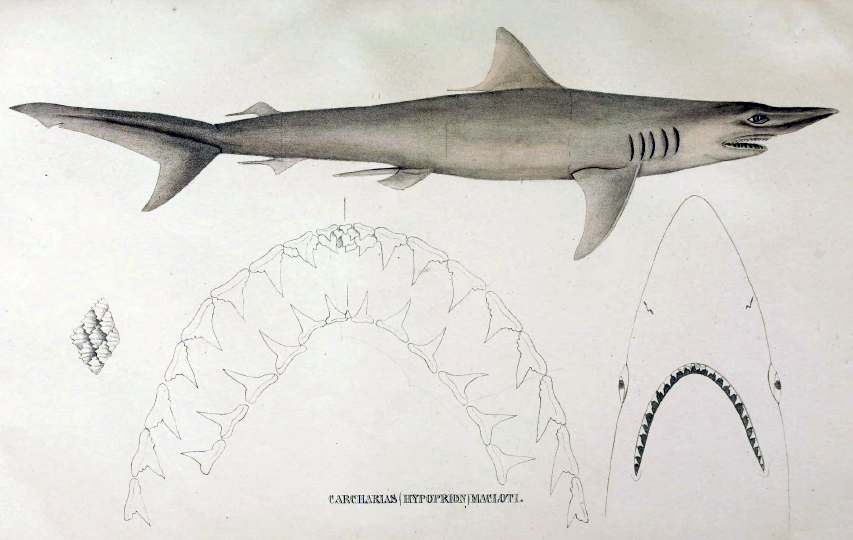
The illustration that accompanied Müller and Henle's description.

The hardnose shark was described by German biologists Johannes Müller and Jakob Henle in their 1839 Systematische Beschreibung der Plagiostomen. They named it Carcharias (Hypoprion) macloti in honour of Heinrich Christian Macklot, who collected the type specimen from New Guinea. In 1862, American ichthyologist Theodore Gill elevated Hypoprion to the rank of full genus, with C. macloti as the type species. In 1985, Jack Garrick synonymised Hypoprion with Carcharhinus. This species may also be called Maclot's shark.

== Phylogeny and evolution ==
The evolutionary relationships of the hardnose shark have not been fully resolved. In a 1988 study based on morphology, Leonard Compagno tentatively grouped the hardnose shark with the Borneo shark (C. borneensis), whitecheek shark (C. dussumieri), Pondicherry shark (C. hemiodon), creek whaler (C. fitzroyensis), smalltail shark (C. porosus), blackspot shark (C. sealei), and spottail shark (C. sorrah). Results from molecular phylogenetic analyses have been inconsistent, with some supporting parts of Compagno's hypothesis: a 1992 study could not resolve the hardnose shark's position in detail, a 2011 study reported that it was close to the clade formed by the whitecheek and blackspot sharks, and a 2012 study concluded that it was the sister species of the Borneo shark.

Teeth apparently belonging to the hardnose shark have been recovered from the Pungo River and Yorktown Formations in the United States, and from the Pirabas Formation in Brazil. The earliest of these fossils date to the Lower Miocene (23–16 Ma).

== Description ==
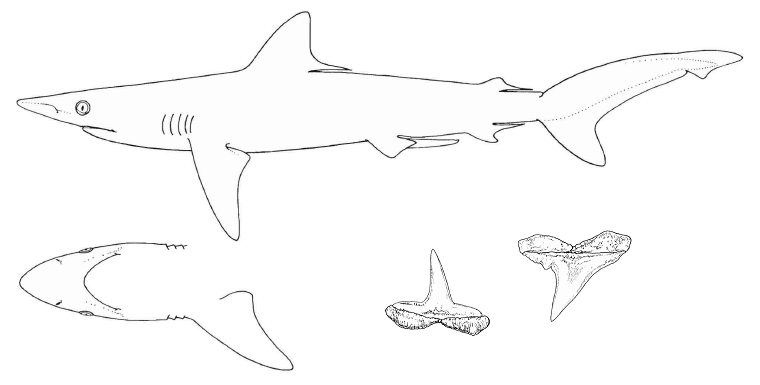
The hardnose shark is slender, with a long snout and elongated rear tips on the dorsal fins.

The hardnose shark is a slim-bodied species with a long, narrow, and pointed snout. Unlike in other Carcharhinus species, its rostral (snout) cartilages are highly calcified, hence the name "hardnose". The circular eyes are rather large and equipped with protective nictitating membranes. There is a narrow lobe of skin on the anterior rim of each nostril. The arched mouth bears inconspicuous furrows at the corners; some sources report that the hyomandibular pores (a series of pores above the corners of the mouth) are enlarged, while others report that they are not. The upper teeth number 29–32 rows and have a narrow, smooth-edged central cusp with very coarse serrations at the base on either side. The lower teeth number 26–29 rows and are narrow and smooth-edged. There are five pairs of fairly short gill slits.

The pectoral fins are fairly short and pointed, with a falcate (sickle-like) shape. The first dorsal fin is medium-sized and triangular, and originates roughly over the pectoral fin free rear tips. The second dorsal fin is small and low, and originates over the middle of the anal fin base. Both dorsal fins have very long free rear tips, and there is a subtle midline ridge between them. A prominent notch is present on the caudal peduncle at the dorsal origin of the caudal fin. The caudal fin has a well-developed lower lobe and a longer upper lobe with a ventral notch near the tip. The skin is covered by overlapping, oval-shaped dermal denticles; each denticle has three horizontal ridges leading to marginal teeth. This species is bronze above and white below, with a barely noticeable pale band on the flanks. The pectoral, pelvic, and anal fins sometimes have lighter margins, while the first dorsal fin and upper caudal fin lobe may have darker margins. The hardnose shark reaches 1.1 m (3.6 ft) in length.

== Distribution and habitat ==
The hardnose shark is common and widely distributed in the tropical western Indo-Pacific. It is found from Kenya to Myanmar in the Indian Ocean, including Sri Lanka and the Andaman Islands. In the Pacific Ocean, it is found from Vietnam to Taiwan and southern Japan, in Indonesia, and off New Guinea and northern Australia. It is usually found in shallow, inshore waters, but has been reported to a depth of 170 m (560 ft). Tagging data has shown that this shark tends not to make long-distance movements, with 30% of re-caught individuals having moved less than 50 km (30 mi) from their initial tagging location. The longest known distance travelled by an individual is 711 km (442 mi).

== Biology and ecology ==
The hardnose shark forms large groups, often associating with spottail sharks and Australian blacktip sharks (C. tilstoni). Males and females generally roam separately from each other. Bony fishes form the main part of this shark's diet, with cephalopods and crustaceans making up the remainder. Parasites of this species include the nematode Acanthocheilus rotundatus and the tapeworm Otobothrium carcharidis. The hardnose shark is viviparous; like in other requiem sharks, once the embryos exhaust their yolk supply, the empty yolk sac develops into a placental connection through which the mother provides nutrition. Females give birth once every other year to one or two pups, following a gestation period of twelve months. Newborns measure 45–55 cm (18–22 in) long, and sexual maturity is attained at 70–75 cm (28–30 in) long. The maximum lifespan is at least 15–20 years.

== Human interactions ==
Harmless to humans, the hardnose shark is caught with gillnets and line gear by artisanal and commercial fisheries across much of its range. It is used for meat, which is sold fresh or dried and salted, though its small size limits its economic importance. Its low reproductive rate may render it susceptible to overfishing, and given existing levels of exploitation, the International Union for Conservation of Nature (IUCN) has assessed it as Near Threatened. Off northern Australia, the hardnose shark makes up 13.6% of the gillnet catch and 4.0% of the longline catch. Since these losses do not appear to have diminished its population there, the IUCN has given it a regional assessment of Least Concern.
