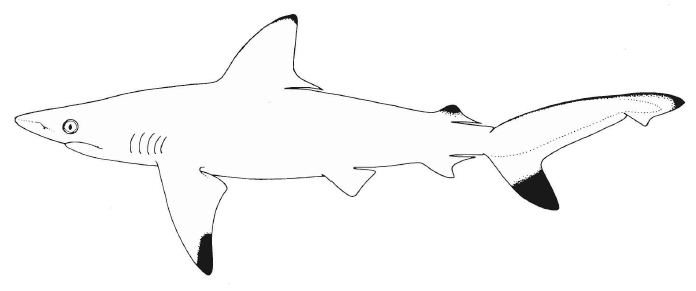

Conservation status
- Critically Endangered (IUCN 3.1)

Scientific classification
- Kingdom: Animalia
- Phylum: Chordata
- Class: Chondrichthyes
- Subclass: Elasmobranchii
- Division: Selachii
- Order: Carcharhiniformes
- Family: Carcharhinidae
- Genus: Carcharhinus
- Species: C. hemiodon

Binomial name
- Carcharhinus hemiodon (J. P. Müller & Henle, 1839)
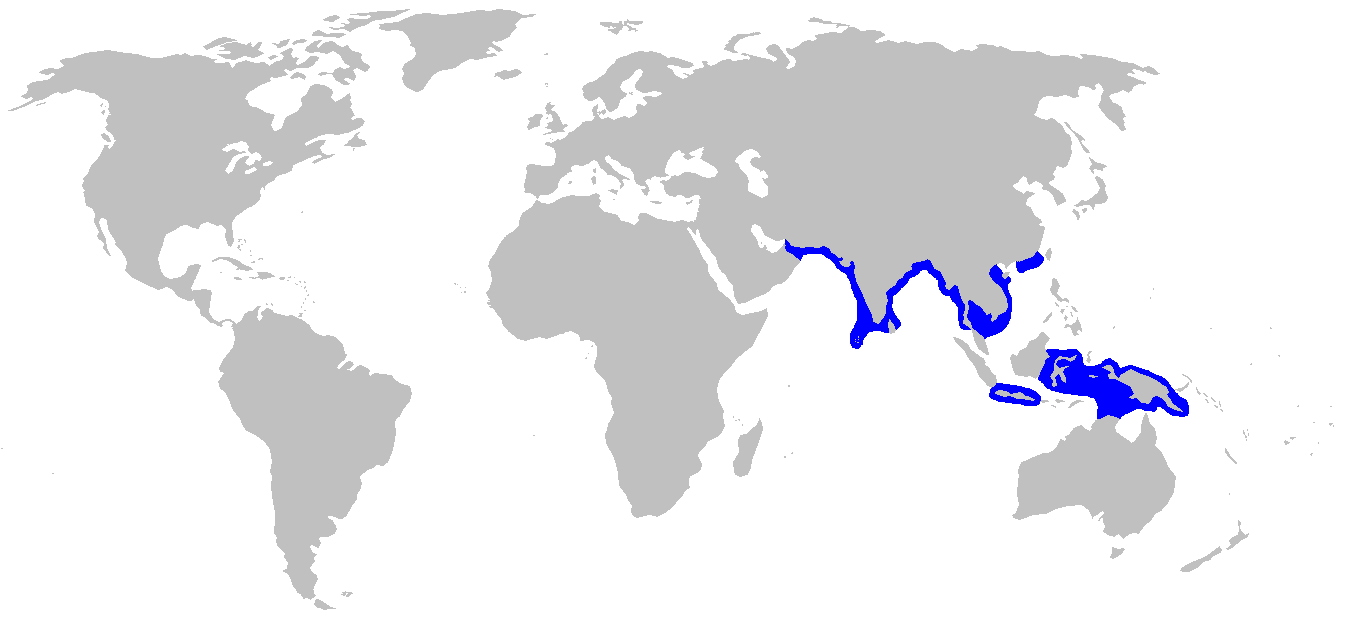
- Range of the Pondicherry shark

Synonyms
- Carcharias hemiodon J. P. Müller & Henle (ex Valenciennes), 1839; Carcharias watu Setna & Sarangdhar, 1946; Hypoprion atripinnis Chu, 1960

= Pondicherry shark =

Species of shark

The Pondicherry shark (Carcharhinus hemiodon) is an extremely rare species of requiem shark, in the family Carcharhinidae. A small and stocky gray shark, it grows not much longer than 1 m (3.3 ft) and has a fairly long, pointed snout. This species can be identified by the shape of its upper teeth, which are strongly serrated near the base and smooth-edged near the tip, and by its first dorsal fin, which is large with a long free rear tip. Furthermore, this shark has prominent black tips on its pectoral fins, second dorsal fin, and caudal fin lower lobe.

The Pondicherry shark is critically endangered. It was once found throughout Indo-Pacific coastal waters from the Gulf of Oman to New Guinea, and is known to enter fresh water. Fewer than 20 specimens are available for study, and most aspects of its natural history are unknown. It probably feeds on bony fishes, cephalopods, and crustaceans, and gives birth to live young with the embryos forming a placental connection to their mother. While the International Union for Conservation of Nature (IUCN) has listed the Pondicherry shark as Critically endangered, it had been thought to be extinct since the 1970s. It is probably threatened by intense and escalating fishing pressure throughout its range. The shark is among the 25 "most wanted lost" species that are the focus of Global Wildlife Conservation's "Search for Lost Species" initiative. The last definitive sighting was from 1979 in India, though putative sightings have been recently reported, some of which were considered to be erroneous.

== Taxonomy ==
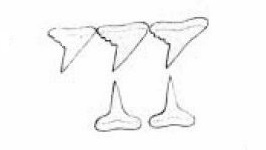
The illustration that accompanied Müller and Henle's description.

The first scientific description of the Pondicherry shark was authored by German biologists Johannes Müller and Jakob Henle in their 1839 Systematische Beschreibung der Plagiostomen. Their account was based on a 47 cm (19 in) long immature male from Puducherry (formerly Pondicherry), India and three more paratypes from the same region. Müller and Henle attributed the name for the new species, Carcharias (Hypoprion) hemiodon, to French zoologist Achille Valenciennes. The specific epithet hemiodon is derived from the Greek hemi ("half") and odon ("tooth").

In 1862, Theodore Gill elevated Hypoprion to the rank of full genus and also placed the Pondicherry shark in its own genus, Hypoprionodon, based on the relative positions of the dorsal and pectoral fins. Subsequent authors generally accepted Gill's first revision but not his second, and thus this species became known as Hypoprion hemiodon. In 1985, Jack Garrick followed up on earlier taxonomic work by Leonard Compagno and synonymized Hypoprion with Carcharhinus. The Pondicherry shark is also commonly referred to as the long nosed shark.

== Phylogeny ==
The evolutionary relationships of the Pondicherry shark are uncertain. In a 1988 study based on morphological data, Compagno tentatively grouped it with the smalltail shark (C. porosus), blackspot shark (C. sealei), spottail shark (C. sorrah), creek whaler (C. fitzroyensis), whitecheek shark (C. dussumieri), Borneo shark (C. borneensis), and hardnose shark (C. macloti).

== Description ==
The Pondicherry shark has a robust build and a moderately long, pointed snout. The large and circular eyes are equipped with nictitating membranes. Each nostril is broad with a small, narrow nipple-shaped lobe on the anterior rim. The arched mouth lacks conspicuous furrows or enlarged pores at the corners. The upper and lower jaws contain 14–15 and 12–14 tooth rows on either side respectively; in addition, there are one or two rows of small teeth at the upper and lower symphyses (jaw midpoints). The upper teeth have a single narrow, smooth-edged central cusp, flanked on both sides by very large serrations. The lower teeth are narrower and more upright than the uppers, and may be smooth to finely serrated. The five pairs of gill slits are fairly long.

Originating below the fourth pair of gill slits, the pectoral fins are short, broad, and falcate (sickle-shaped) with pointed tips. The first dorsal fin is tall and falcate with a distinctively long free rear tip, and is positioned just behind the pectoral fin bases. The second dorsal fin is large and tall without a notably elongated free rear tip, and is positioned over or slightly behind the anal fin. Usually there is no midline ridge between the dorsal fins, and when present the ridge is slight. The caudal peduncle has a deep crescent-shaped notch at the upper caudal fin origin. The asymmetrical caudal fin has a well-developed lower lobe and a longer upper lobe with a notch in the trailing margin near the tip.

The skin is covered by overlapping dermal denticles; each denticle has three horizontal ridges leading to three (rarely five) marginal teeth. This species is gray above and white below, with an obvious pale stripe on the flanks. The pectoral fins, second dorsal fin, and lower caudal fin lobe are prominently tipped in black, while the first dorsal fin and dorsal caudal fin lobe are narrowly edged in black. The maximum size reached by the Pondicherry shark is uncertain due to a lack of large specimens, but is probably not much greater than 1 m (3.3 ft).

== Distribution and habitat ==
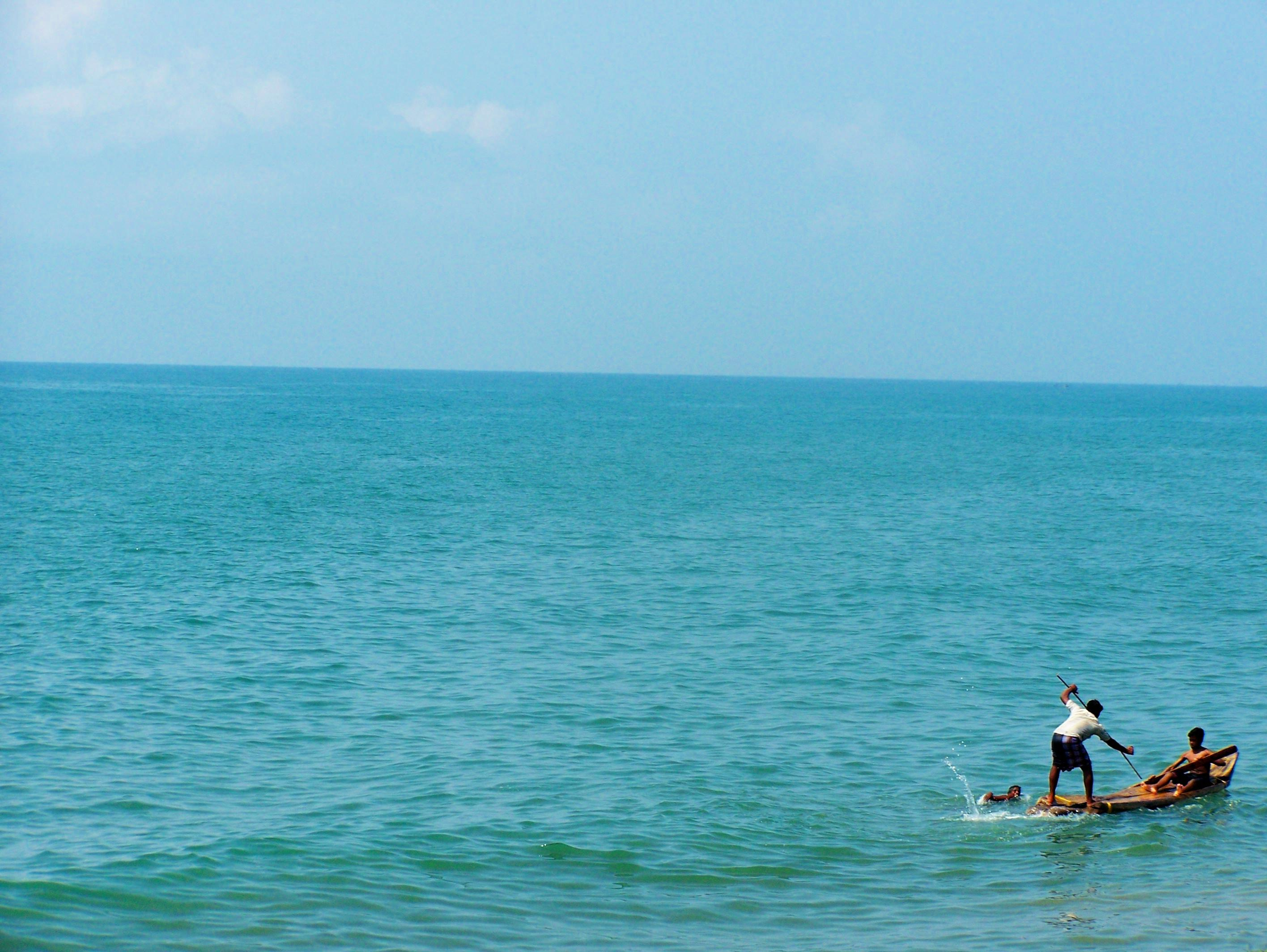
Most records of the Pondicherry shark are from the coastal waters of India.

The Pondicherry shark appears to have been broadly distributed in the Indo-Pacific. It may have once been common, as it was reportedly a regular catch off India and Pakistan, but is now extremely rare. Most of the known specimens were collected from India, with more specimens from the Gulf of Oman, Borneo, and Java. There are also less reliable records from the South China Sea, other parts of Southeast Asia such as Vietnam and the Philippines, New Guinea, and northern Australia. This species inhabits inshore waters. Several older sources reported that it could be found in rivers such as the Hooghli River and the Saigon River. These reports may have confused a river shark (Glyphis sp.) for the Pondicherry shark; if accurate, they would suggest this species to be tolerant of low salinity.

== Biology and ecology ==
The diet of the Pondicherry shark is thought to consist of small bony fishes, cephalopods, and crustaceans. A parasite documented from this species is the tapeworm Acanthobothrium paramanandai. Like other requiem sharks, it is viviparous with the developing embryos sustained to term via a placental connection to the mother, though specific details are unknown. The smallest known specimen is a female 32 cm (13 in) long, which may be close to the birth size. Sexual maturity is attained at a length of over 60 cm (24 in).

== Human interactions ==
Harmless to humans, the Pondicherry shark was caught and used for meat. Fewer than 20 specimens have been deposited in museum collections, most of which were collected prior to 1900. This shark's rarity originally led to fears that it may be possibly extinct, with the last verifiable record from 1979 in India. In 2014, the Pondicherry shark was claimed to have been discovered in the Sri Lankan Menik rivers with two photographs as evidence, but the IUCN rejected this sighting as a misidentified juvenile bull shark. Putative sightings from the rivers of India in the late 2010s have also recently been reported. Given that artisan and commercial fishing activity across its range is heavy, unregulated, and intensifying, the International Union for Conservation of Nature (IUCN) has listed the Pondicherry shark as critically endangered and placed a high priority on locating any surviving populations.
