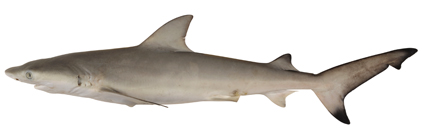

Conservation status
- Least Concern (IUCN 3.1)

Scientific classification
- Kingdom: Animalia
- Phylum: Chordata
- Class: Chondrichthyes
- Subclass: Elasmobranchii
- Division: Selachii
- Order: Carcharhiniformes
- Family: Carcharhinidae
- Genus: Carcharhinus
- Species: C. cautus

Binomial name
- Carcharhinus cautus (Whitley, 1945)
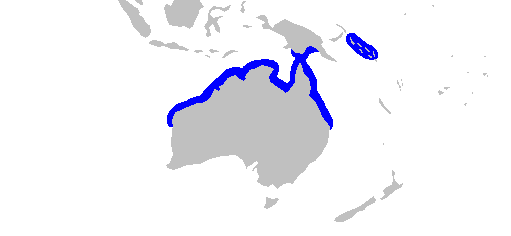
- Range of the nervous shark

Synonyms
- Galeolamna greyi cauta Whitley, 1945

= Nervous shark =

Species of shark

The nervous shark (Carcharhinus cautus) is a species of requiem shark, and part of the family Carcharhinidae, so named because of its timid behavior in regard to humans. It is common in shallow, coastal waters off northern Australia, Papua New Guinea, and the Solomon Islands. A small brownish or grayish shark typically measuring 1.0–1.3 m (3.3–4.3 ft) long, this species has a short, blunt snout, oval eyes, and a relatively large second dorsal fin. The leading margins of most fins are finely edged with black, and the lower caudal fin lobe is black-tipped.

Small bony fishes are the main prey of the nervous shark, while crustaceans, molluscs, and snakes may also be eaten. It is viviparous, with the developing embryos nourished through a placental connection. The details of its life history seem to vary depending on latitude—for example, the timing of the breeding season and the length of the gestation period. Females produce litters of one to six young either annually or biennially. The harmless nervous shark is caught incidentally by coastal gillnet fisheries and perhaps also by line and trawl fisheries. The International Union for Conservation of Nature (IUCN) has been listed under Least Concern.

== Taxonomy and phylogeny ==
Australian ichthyologist Gilbert Percy Whitley originally described the nervous shark as a subspecies of Galeolamna greyi (a junior synonym of Carcharhinus obscurus, the dusky shark), in a 1945 issue of the scientific journal Australian Zoologist. He gave it the name cauta, meaning "cautious" in Latin, because of its skittish demeanor when confronted by people. Later authors have recognized this shark as a distinct species, placed in the genus Carcharhinus. The type specimen consists of the preserved skin and teeth of a 92 cm (36 in) long female caught in Shark Bay, Western Australia.

Based on morphology, Jack Garrick suggested in 1982 that the nervous shark is closely related to the blacktip reef shark (C. melanopterus). Leonard Compagno in 1988 tentatively grouped these two species with the blacknose shark (C. acronotus), the copper shark (C. brachyurus), the silky shark (C. falciformis), and the night shark (C. signatus). The close relationship between the nervous and blacktip reef sharks was upheld in a 1992 phylogenetic study by Shane Lavery, based on allozymes, and again in a 2011 study by Ximena Vélez-Zuazoa and Ingi Agnarsson, based on nuclear and mitochondrial genes.

== Description ==
The nervous shark has a rather stout, spindle-shaped body and a short, broadly rounded snout. The anterior margin of each nostril is extended into a slender nipple-shaped lobe. The moderately large eyes are horizontally oval in shape and equipped with nictitating membranes. The mouth lacks conspicuous furrows at the corners and contains 25–30 upper and 23–28 lower tooth rows. The upper teeth are narrow and angled, with coarsely serrated edges. The lower teeth are more slender and upright in shape, and have finer serrations. The five pairs of gill slits are medium in length.

The pectoral fins are moderately long, narrow, and pointed. The first dorsal fin originates over the free rear tips of the pectoral fins; it is large and falcate (sickle-shaped) with a pointed apex. The second dorsal fin is positioned opposite the anal fin and is relatively large and high. There is no ridge between the dorsal fins. A crescent-shaped notch is present on the caudal peduncle just before the upper caudal fin origin. The caudal fin is asymmetrical, with a strong lower lobe and a longer upper lobe with a ventral notch near the tip. The dermal denticles are overlapping and bear three horizontal ridges (five in larger individuals) leading to marginal teeth. This species is bronze to gray above and white below, with a white stripe on the flank. A thin black line runs along the leading margins of the dorsal fins, pectoral fins, and the upper caudal fin lobe, as well as the caudal fin trailing margin; the lower caudal fin lobe and sometimes the pectoral fins are also tipped in black. The nervous shark typically reaches 1.0–1.3 m (3.3–4.3 ft) in length and may grow up to 1.5 m (4.9 ft) long. Females attain larger sizes than males.

== Distribution and habitat ==
The nervous shark is found over continental and insular shelves off northern Australia from Shark Bay in the west to Moreton Bay in the east, as well as off Papua New Guinea and around the Solomon Islands. It is among the most common sharks in Darwin Harbor, the Gulf of Carpentaria, and Shark Bay. This species generally inhabits shallow inshore waters, to a depth of at least 45 m (148 ft). It seems to particularly favor mangrove-lined areas with sandy-muddy bottoms and avoids areas with dense seagrass cover.

== Biology and ecology ==
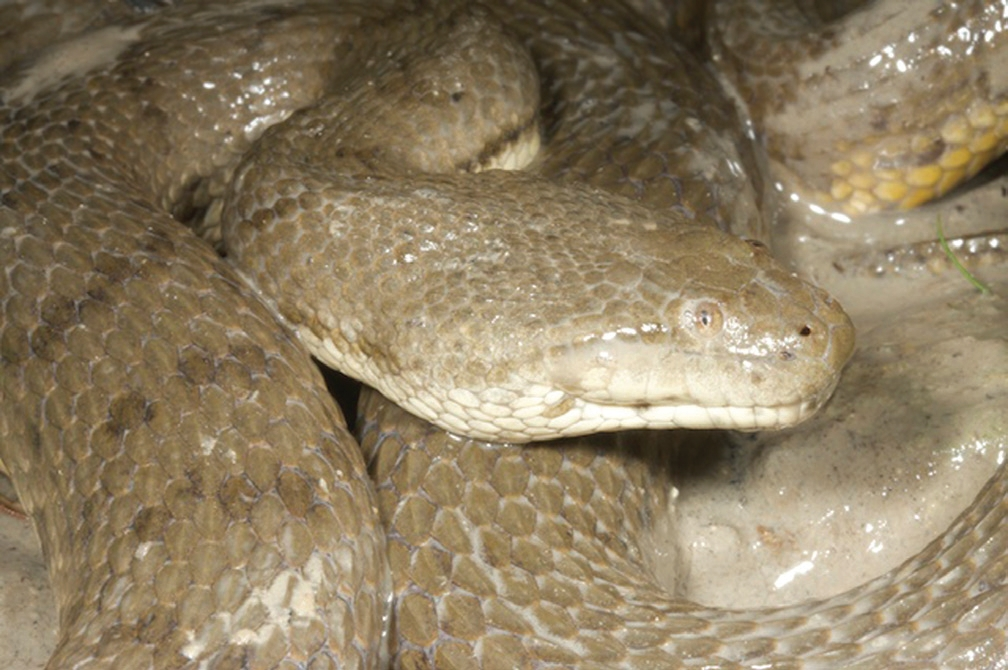
The snake Cerberus rynchops is sometimes eaten by the nervous shark.

The diet of the nervous shark consists mainly of small teleost fishes (including silversides, smelt-whitings, wrasses, and grunters). Crustaceans (including prawns, crabs, and mantis shrimps) and molluscs (predominantly cephalopods but also bivalves and gastropods) constitute secondary food sources. This shark is also known to occasionally prey on the semiaquatic snakes Cerberus rynchops and Fordonia leucobalia. A known parasite of the nervous shark is the myxosporean Kudoa carcharhini.

Like other requiem sharks, the nervous shark is viviparous: once the embryos exhaust their initial supply of yolk, they are provisioned by the mother through a placental connection formed from the depleted yolk sac. Adult females have a single functional ovary, on the right, and two functional uteruses. The male bites at the sides of the female as a prelude to mating. After mating, the female stores the sperm for approximately four weeks prior to fertilization. In Darwin Harbor, mating occurs from January to March and birthing occurs in October and November following a gestation period of eight to nine months. In Shark Bay, mating occurs from late October to early November and birthing occurs around the same time the following year, following a gestation period of 11 months; this slower development likely reflects the cooler temperatures of Shark Bay.

Females produce litters on an annual cycle in Darwin Harbor and on a biennial cycle in Shark Bay. The litter size ranges from one to six and is not correlated with the size of the female. The newborns are relatively large, measuring 35–40 cm (14–16 in) long, and are birthed in shallow nursery areas such as Herald Bight in Shark Bay. The juvenile growth rate is high for a shark; males and females mature sexually at around 84 and 91 cm (33 and 36 in), respectively, in Darwin Harbour, and 91 and 101 cm (36 and 40 in), respectively, in Shark Bay. The age at maturity is around four years for males and six years for females; the maximum lifespan is at least 12 years for males and 16 years for females.

== Human interactions ==
Shy and difficult to approach, the nervous shark is harmless to humans. It is occasionally marketed for food. This species is susceptible to being caught incidentally in coastal gillnets, such as the barramundi (Lates calcarifer) gillnet fishery operating off northern Australia. It may also be caught on line gear and in prawn trawls. The Australian nervous shark population does not appear to be threatened by fishing activities, and there the International Union for Conservation of Nature (IUCN) has assessed it as Least Concern.
