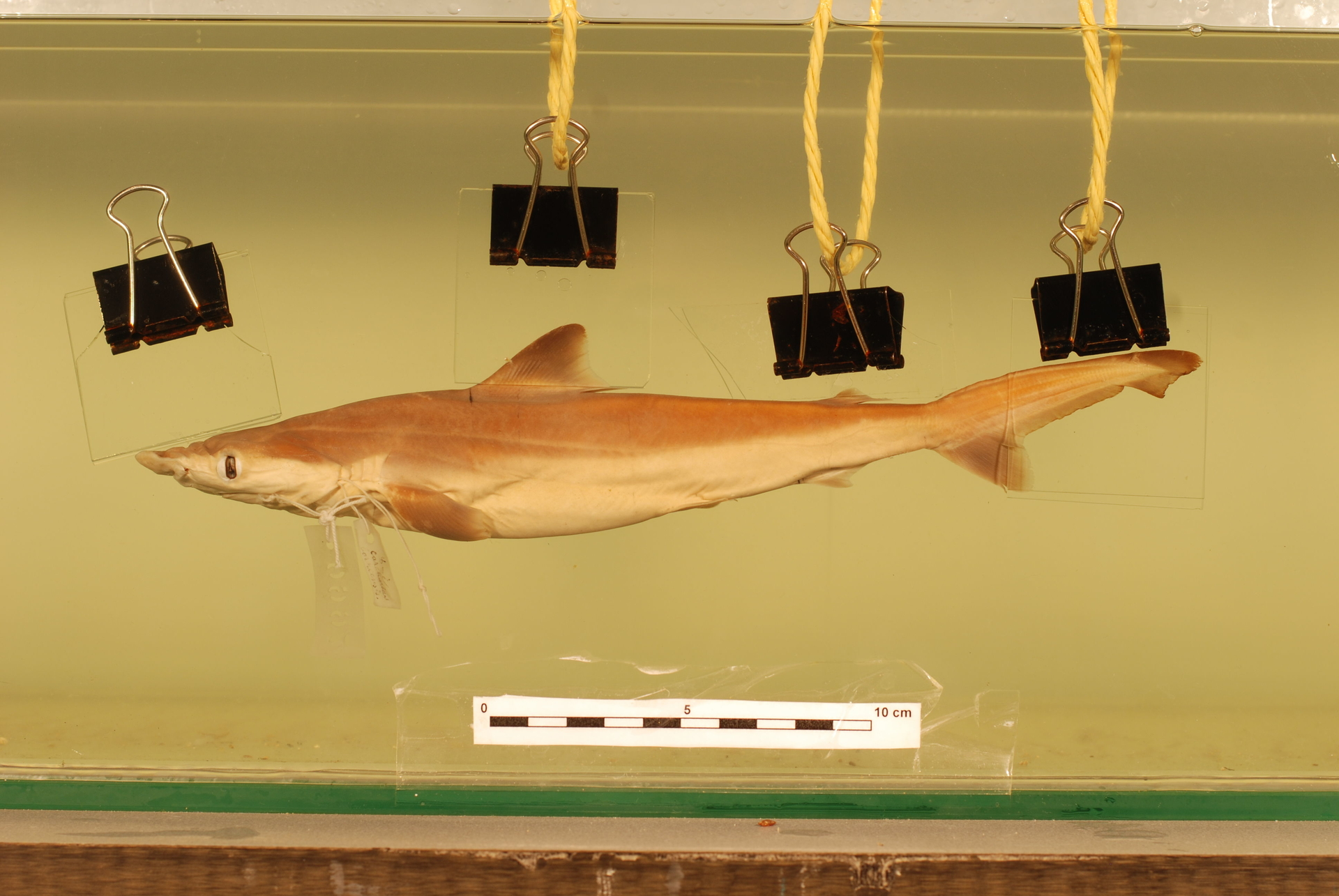

Conservation status
- Critically Endangered (IUCN 3.1)

Scientific classification
- Kingdom: Animalia
- Phylum: Chordata
- Class: Chondrichthyes
- Subclass: Elasmobranchii
- Division: Selachii
- Order: Carcharhiniformes
- Family: Carcharhinidae
- Genus: Carcharhinus
- Species: C. borneensis

Binomial name
- Carcharhinus borneensis (Bleeker, 1858)
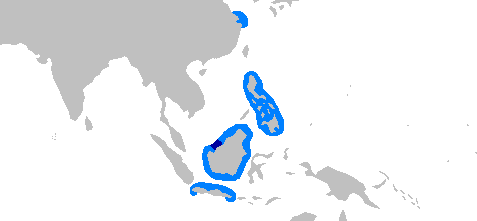
- Present (dark blue) and possible historical (light blue) range of the Borneo shark

Synonyms
- Carcharias borneensis Bleeker, 1858

= Borneo shark =

Rare species of requiem shark

The Borneo shark (Carcharhinus borneensis) is a species of requiem shark, and part of the family Carcharhinidae. Extremely rare, it is known only from inshore waters around Mukah in northwestern Borneo, though it may once have been more widely distributed. A small, gray shark reaching 65 cm (26 in) in length, this species is the only member of its genus with a row of enlarged pores above the corners of its mouth. It has a slender body with a long, pointed snout and a low second dorsal fin placed posterior to the anal fin origin.

Almost nothing is known about the natural history of the Borneo shark. It is viviparous like other requiem sharks; the females bear litters of six pups, which are provisioned through gestation by a placental connection. The International Union for Conservation of Nature last assessed this species as Critically Endangered. While an extant population has since been found, the Borneo shark continues to merit conservation concern given its highly limited range within heavily fished waters.

== Taxonomy and phylogeny ==
Dutch ichthyologist Pieter Bleeker originally described the Borneo shark as Carcharias (Prionodon) borneensis in an 1858 issue of the scientific journal Acta Societatis Regiae Scientiarum Indo-Neêrlandicae. He based his account on a newborn male 24 cm (9.4 in) long, caught off Singkawang in western Kalimantan, Borneo. Later authors have recognized this species as belonging to the genus Carcharhinus. Before 2004, only five specimens of the Borneo shark were known, all of them immature and collected before 1937. In April and May 2004, researchers from Universiti Malaysia Sabah discovered a number of additional specimens while surveying the fishery resources of Sabah and Sarawak.

The evolutionary relationships of the Borneo shark are uncertain. Jack Garrick, in his 1982 morphological study, did not place it close to any other member of the genus. Leonard Compagno in 1988 tentatively grouped it with the smalltail shark (C. porosus), blackspot shark (C. sealei), spottail shark (C. sorrah), creek whaler (C. fitzroyensis), whitecheek shark (C. dussumieri), hardnose shark (C. macloti), and Pondicherry shark (C. hemiodon). The Borneo shark resembles the sharpnose sharks (Rhizoprionodon) in certain traits, for example the enlarged pores by its mouth. Nevertheless, other aspects of its morphology firmly place it within Carcharhinus.

== Description ==
The Borneo shark is slim-bodied, with a long, pointed snout and oblique, slit-like nostrils preceded by narrow, nipple-shaped flaps of skin. The eyes are rather large and circular, and equipped with nictitating membranes. The corners of the sizable mouth bear short, indistinct furrows, and immediately above are a series of enlarged pores that are unique within the genus. There are 25–26 upper and 23–25 lower tooth rows. The upper teeth have a single, narrow, oblique cusp with strongly serrated edges, and large cusplets on the trailing side. The lower teeth are similar, but tend to be more slender and finely serrated. The five pairs of gill slits are short.

The pectoral fins are short, pointed, and falcate (sickle-shaped), while the pelvic fins are small and triangular with a nearly straight trailing margin. The first dorsal fin is fairly large and triangular, with a blunt apex sloping down to a sinuous trailing margin; its origin lies over the free rear tips of the pectoral fins. The second dorsal fin is small and low, and originates over the middle of the anal fin base. There is no ridge between the dorsal fins. The caudal peduncle bears a deep, crescent-shaped pit at the origin of the upper caudal fin lobe. The asymmetrical caudal fin has a well-developed lower lobe and a longer, narrow upper lobe with a strong ventral notch near the tip. The dermal denticles are small and overlapping, each with three horizontal ridges leading to marginal teeth. This species is slate-gray above, darkening towards the tips of the dorsal fins and upper caudal fin lobe; some specimens have irregular rows of small, white blotches, which may be an artifact of handling. The underside is white, which extends onto the flanks as a vague pale band. There are faint, lighter edges on the pectoral, pelvic, and anal fin trailing margins. The largest known specimen measures 65 cm (26 in) long.

== Distribution and habitat ==
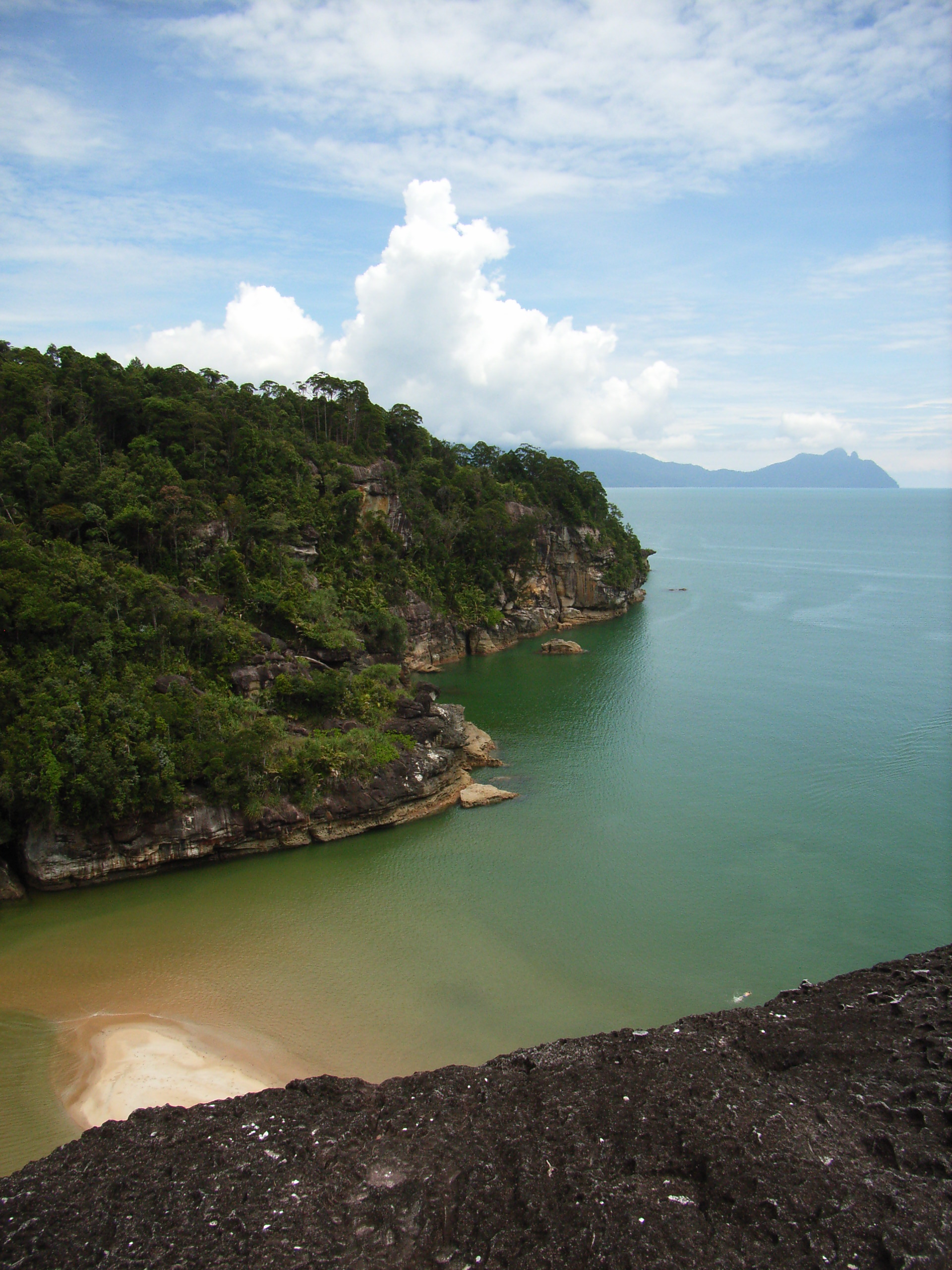
The Borneo shark is only known to inhabit the coastal waters of Sarawak.

All recent specimens of the Borneo shark have been collected solely from fishery landing sites at Mukah in Sarawak, despite thorough surveys across the rest of Borneo (including at the locality of the type specimen). Thus, its range may now be restricted to shallow, inshore waters in northwestern Borneo. Of the five earlier specimens, four came from Borneo and one from Zhoushan Island in China, hinting at a wider historical distribution. This species was also recorded from Borongan in the Philippines in 1895, and Java in 1933; these records cannot be substantiated and there have been no subsequent sightings from these areas.

=== Fossil record ===
Fossils of the Borneo shark are known from as early as the Late Miocene. At the site of Ambug Hill in Brunei, their remains have been found alongside those of blacktip sharks and members of the genera Paragaleus, Chiloscyllium, Rhinobatos, Scoliodon, and Lamiopsis.

== Biology and ecology ==
Bony fishes are probably the main food of the Borneo shark. It is viviparous like other requiem sharks, with the developing embryos provisioned by the mother through a placental connection formed from the depleted yolk sac. The litter size is six, and the pups are born at close to 24–28 cm (9.4–11.0 in) long. From the available specimens, the length at sexual maturity can be surmised to be under 55–58 cm (22–23 in) in males and under 61–65 cm (24–26 in) in females.

== Human interactions ==
The International Union for Conservation of Nature last assessed the Borneo shark as Critically Endangered. Previously, several fishery surveys within its supposed historical range had failed to find it. The Borneo shark's conservation status remains precarious given its very small range in waters subjected to intensive artisanal and commercial fishing. It is caught by line gear and used for meat, though it has minimal commercial significance.
