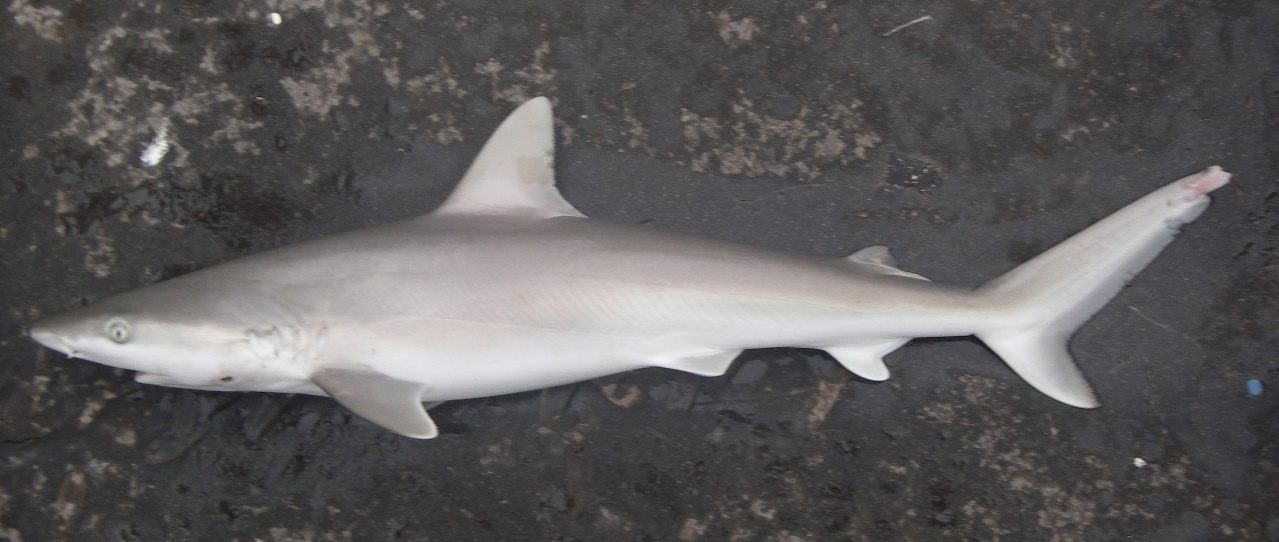

Conservation status
- Endangered (IUCN 3.1)

Scientific classification
- Kingdom: Animalia
- Phylum: Chordata
- Class: Chondrichthyes
- Subclass: Elasmobranchii
- Division: Selachii
- Order: Carcharhiniformes
- Family: Carcharhinidae
- Genus: Carcharhinus
- Species: C. acronotus

Binomial name
- Carcharhinus acronotus (Poey, 1860)
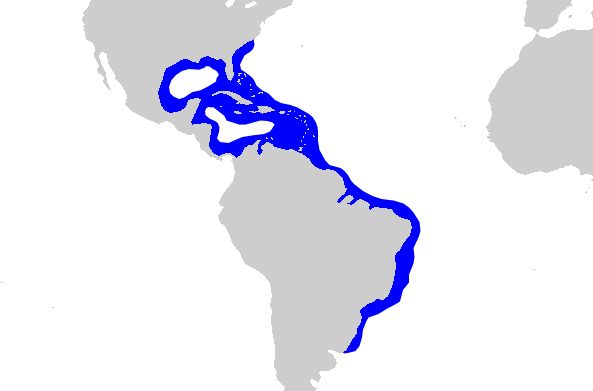
- Range of the blacknose shark

Synonyms
- Prionodon curcuri Castelnau, 1855; Squalus acronotus Poey, 1860 * ambiguous synonym

= Blacknose shark =

Species of shark

The blacknose shark (Carcharhinus acronotus) is a species of requiem shark, belonging to the family Carcharhinidae, common in the tropical and subtropical waters of the western Atlantic Ocean. This species generally inhabits coastal seagrass, sand, or rubble habitats, with adults preferring deeper water than juveniles. A small shark typically measuring 1.3 m (4.3 ft) long, the blacknose has a typical streamlined "requiem shark" shape with a long, rounded snout, large eyes, and a small first dorsal fin. Its common name comes from a characteristic black blotch on the tip of its snout, though this may be indistinct in older individuals.

Blacknose sharks feed primarily on small bony fishes and cephalopods, and in turn fall prey to larger sharks. Like other members of their family, they exhibit a viviparous mode of reproduction in which the developing embryos are sustained by a placental connection. The females give birth to three to six young in late spring or early summer, either annually or biennially, after a gestation period of eight to 11 months. This species is not known to attack humans, though it has been documented performing a threat display towards divers. It is of moderate commercial and recreational importance. In 2009, the U.S. National Oceanic and Atmospheric Administration announced the populations of the blacknose shark off the United States are being overfished, and proposed new conservation measures.

== Taxonomy and phylogeny ==
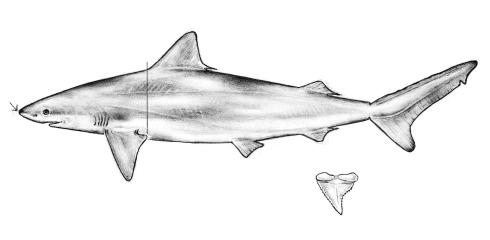
Drawing of a blacknose shark and one of its upper teeth - the arrows and vertical line refer to diagnostic features of the species.

The Cuban naturalist Felipe Poey published the first description of the blacknose shark in 1860 as Squalus acronotus, in his Memorias sobre la historia natural de la Isla de Cuba. Later authors moved this species to the genus Carcharhinus. The type specimen was a 98-cm (3.2-ft)-long male caught off Cuba.

Based on morphological data, Jack Garrick suggested in 1982 that the blacknose shark has a sister relationship to a group containing the whitecheek shark (C. dussumieri) and the blackspot shark (C. sealei), while Leonard Compagno proposed in 1988 that this shark belongs in a group with five other species, including the silky shark (C. falciformis) and the blacktip reef shark (C. melanopterus). Molecular analyses have been similarly equivocal regarding the blacknose shark's phylogenetic relationships: Gavin Naylor's 1992 allozyme analysis found this species to be the most basal member of Carcharhinus, while Mine Dosay-Abkulut's 2008 ribosomal DNA analysis indicated affinity between it and the blacktip shark (C. limbatus) or the smalltail shark (C. porosus). The whitenose shark (Nasolamia velox), found along the tropical western coast of the Americas, may be descended from blacknose sharks that experienced the teratogenic effects of incipient cyclopia.

== Distribution and habitat ==
The blacknose shark inhabits the continental and insular shelves off the eastern coast of the Americas, as far north as North Carolina and as far south as southern Uruguay, including the Bahamas, the Gulf of Mexico, and the Caribbean Sea. They frequent coastal waters over beds of seagrass, sandy flats, and shell or coral rubble. This species is spatially segregated by size and sex. Generally, only young sharks are encountered in shallow water, as the adults prefer depths greater than 9 m (30 ft) and is most common at 18–64 m (59–210 ft). Blacknose sharks in the South Atlantic Bight (off the Atlantic coast of the southern United States) migrate northward in the summer and southward (or possibly offshore) in the winter; a similar migration occurs for sharks in the Gulf of Mexico.

== Description ==
The blacknose shark has a slender, streamlined body with a long, rounded snout and large eyes. A well-developed flap of skin occurs in front of each nostril, defining the inflow and outflow openings. Twelve to 13 and 11 to 12 tooth rows occur on either side of the upper and lower jaws, respectively, with one or two teeth at the symphysis (middle). The teeth are triangular and oblique, with serrated edges; the upper teeth are stouter than the lower teeth. The five pairs of gill slits are short, measuring less a third the length of the first dorsal fin base.

The first dorsal fin is small and somewhat sickle-shaped, with a pointed apex and a short, free, rear tip; its origin lies over the free rear tips of the pectoral fins. The second dorsal fin is relatively large, though still less than half the height of the first. No ridge is seen between the dorsal fins. The pectoral fins are short and tapered. The body is covered with overlapping dermal denticles that bear five to seven longitudinal ridges (three in very young individuals) leading to three to five marginal teeth. The coloration is yellowish to greenish-gray or brown above and white to yellow below. A distinctive dark blotch at the tip of the snout is most obvious in young sharks. The tips of the second dorsal fin, upper caudal fin lobe, and sometimes the lower caudal fin lobe, are dark. Blacknose sharks are typically 1.3–1.4 m (4.3–4.6 ft) long and 10 kg (22 lb) in weight. The maximum length and weight on record is 2.0 m (6.6 ft) and 18.9 kg (42 lb), respectively.

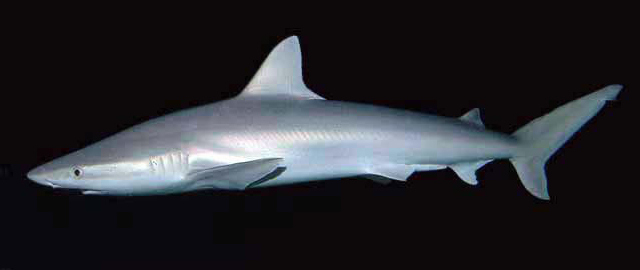
The blacknose shark is slimly built, with a long snout and relatively small first dorsal and pectoral fins.

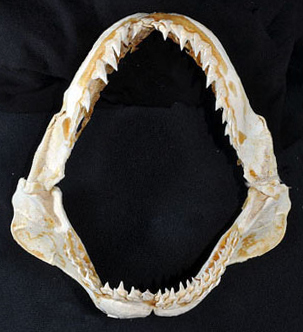
Jaws

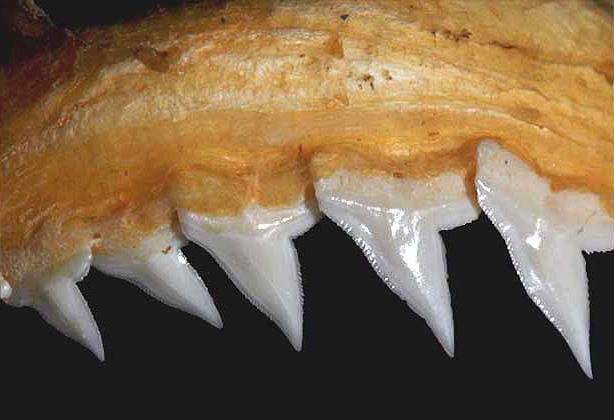
Upper teeth

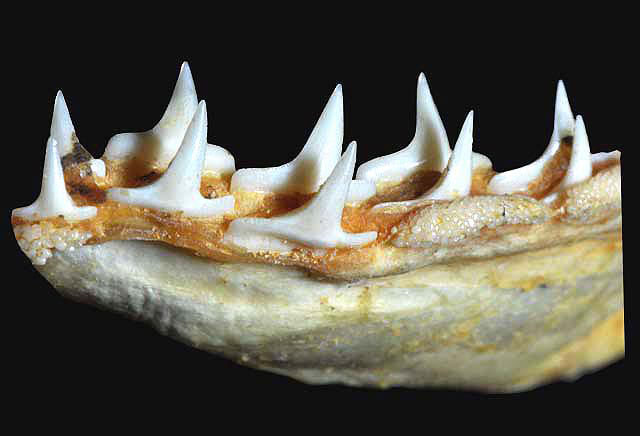
Lower teeth

== Biology and ecology ==
A small, fast-swimming predator, the blacknose shark feeds primarily on small, bony fishes, including pinfish, croakers, porgies, anchovies, spiny boxfish, and porcupinefish, as well as on octopus and other cephalopods. When competing for bait, their speed allows them to snatch food from larger sharks such as the Caribbean reef shark (C. perezi). This species may form large schools that are sometimes associated with anchovies and mullet. Blacknose sharks demonstrate a high degree of philopatry: both juveniles and adults have been documented returning to the same local area year after year.

Blacknose sharks are preyed upon by larger sharks, and captives have been observed to perform an apparent threat display towards encroaching divers or newly introduced members of their species. The display consists of the shark hunching its back, lowering its pectoral fins, gaping its jaws, and swimming with an exaggerated side-to-side motion. Known parasites of this species include the copepods Nesippus orientalis, Perissopus dentatus, Pandarus sinuatus, Kroyeria sphyrnae, Nemesis atlantica, and Eudactylina spinifera, as well as tapeworms in the genera Paraorygmatobothrium and Platybothrium.

=== Life history ===
As in other requiem sharks, the blacknose shark is viviparous; after the developing embryos exhaust their supply of yolk, the empty yolk sac develops into a placental connection through which the mother provides nourishment. Off the United States, males are thought to reproduce every year, while females reproduce every other year. However, off northeastern Brazil, the female reproductive cycle is short enough to occur annually. Vitellogenesis (the formation of yolk within the ovary) occurs in the late summer, and is immediately followed by mating and fertilization in the fall, with the young being born the following spring to summer. The seasonality of these events means the reproductive cycle is offset by six months between populations in the Northern and Southern Hemispheres. The gestation period has been variously estimated at eight months off northeastern Brazil and 9–11 months off the southeastern United States.

Females typically give birth to litters of one to six pups in shallow nursery areas, such as coastal bays or mangrove swamps; one known nursery area is Bulls Bay off South Carolina. No relationship is seen between female size and the number of young. The newborns measure 38–50 cm (15–20 in) long. Female blacknose sharks grow more slowly, attain a larger ultimate size, and have a longer lifespan than males. In addition, Gulf of Mexico sharks are slower-growing and longer-lived than those from the South Atlantic Bight. In the South Atlantic Bight, both sexes mature at a fork length (from snout tip to caudal fin fork) around 90 cm (3.0 ft), corresponding to ages of 4.3 years for males and 4.5 years for females. In the Gulf of Mexico, both sexes mature at a fork length around 85 cm (2.79 ft), corresponding to ages of 5.4 years for males and 6.6 years for females. The maximum lifespan has been calculated as 19 years in South Atlantic Bight and 16.5 years in the Gulf of Mexico.

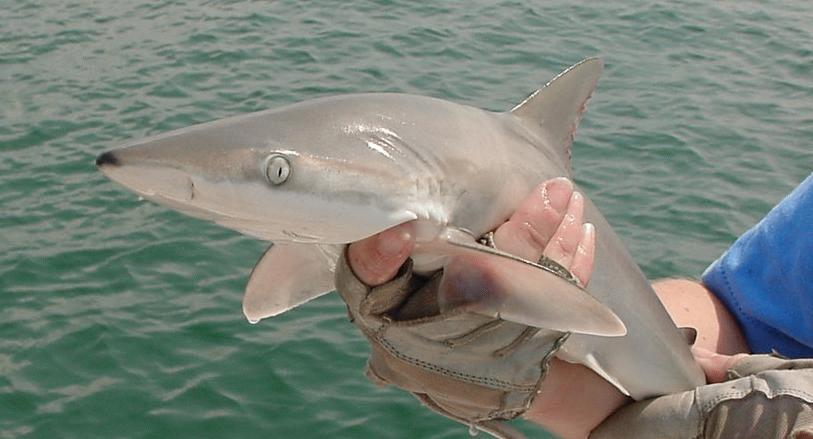
The blacknose shark is not known to pose a danger to humans.

== Human interactions ==
The blacknose shark has never been implicated in an attack on humans. However, caution should be exercised if it begins to perform a threat display. This species is regarded as a game fish and offers a respectable fight on light tackle (a more delicate fishing line). It is also of regional commercial importance, being taken intentionally and as bycatch via gillnets and surface longlines across its range, most significantly off southwestern Florida, Venezuela, and Brazil; the meat is sold dried and salted. Large numbers of blacknose sharks are also caught incidentally by shrimp trawlers, which may pose a greater threat to its population, as many of the sharks taken are immature.

Off the United States, the fishing of the blacknose shark is regulated by the U.S. National Marine Fisheries Service 1993 Fisheries Management Plan (FMP) for Atlantic and Gulf of Mexico sharks. For the purposes of commercial quotas and bag limits, the blacknose shark is classified within the "small coastal shark" (SCS) complex. From 1999 to 2005, an average of 27,484 blacknose sharks (62 metric tons) was caught each year off the United States. Recent stock assessments conducted by the U.S. National Oceanic and Atmospheric Administration (NOAA) have determined the populations of this species have become overfished in both the Atlantic and the Gulf of Mexico. In 2009, the NOAA proposed instituting a separate quota for blacknose sharks of 6,065 sharks per year, and a ban on using gillnets to catch sharks in the Atlantic. By contrast, blacknose shark stocks off northern Brazil appear to be stable, while no fishery data are available from the Caribbean. The International Union for Conservation of Nature has assessed this species as endangered globally.
