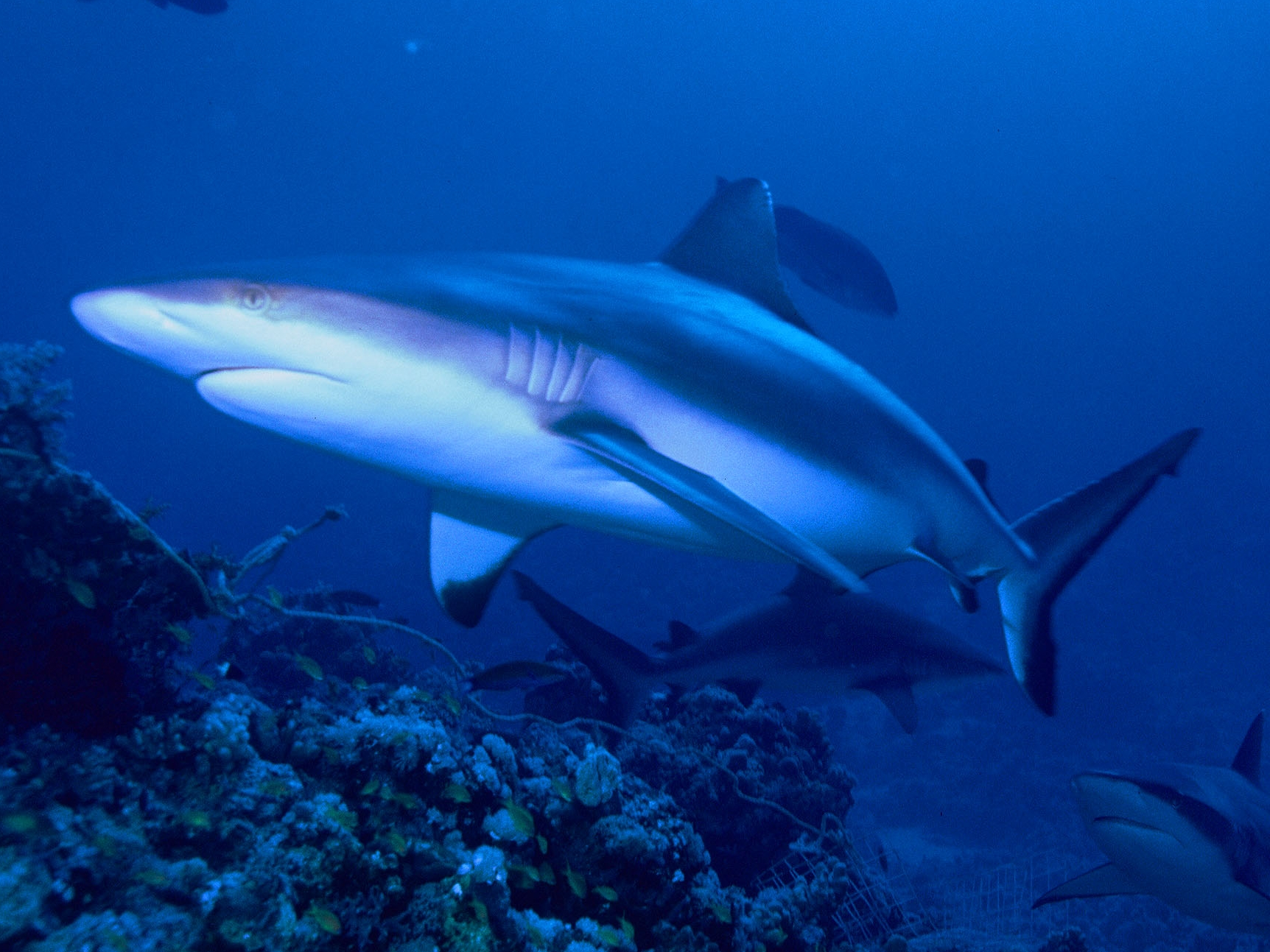
- Gray reef shark (C. amblyrhynchos)

Scientific classification
- Kingdom: Animalia
- Phylum: Chordata
- Class: Chondrichthyes
- Subclass: Elasmobranchii
- Division: Selachii
- Order: Carcharhiniformes
- Family: Carcharhinidae
- Genus: Carcharhinus; Blainville 1816

Type species
- Carcharias elegans Quoy & Gaimard 1824

Synonyms
- Aprionodon Gill 1861; Eulamia Gill 1862; Galeolamna Owen 1853; Gillisqualus Whitley 1934; Hypoprion Müller & Henle 1838; Isogomphodon Gill 1862; Platypodon Gill 1862; Pterolamiops Springer 1951; Uranga Whitley 1943

= Carcharhinus =

Carcharhinus Temporal range: Lutetian-recent ~42–0 Ma

Genus of sharks

Carcharhinus is the type genus of the family Carcharhinidae. One of 10 genera in its family, it contains over half of the species therein. It contains 36-38 extant and eight extinct species to date, with likely more species yet to be described.

== Species ==
Fossil teeth suggest that a majority of extant species in Carcharhinus already evolved by the Early Miocene, and these species start appearing in the fossil record starting from this time. Fossil Carcharhinus teeth tend to be highly species-specific in morphology, but are highly variable both within and among species, and even within the jaw, and thus require careful study to assign to their respective species.

=== Extant ===
The following species are placed in this genus:

Genus Carcharhinus Blainville 1816 - 36 extant species
Common name	Scientific name	Geographic range	Conservation status IUCN Red List	Length	Image
Blacknose shark	Carcharhinus acronotus (Poey, 1860)	Blacknose shark geographic range	Endangered	1.3 m (4.3 ft)	Blacknose shark (Carcharhinus acronotus)
Silvertip shark	Carcharhinus albimarginatus (Rüppell, 1837)	Silvertip shark geographic range	Vulnerable	2–2.5 m (6.6–8.2 ft) maximum 3 m (9.8 ft)	Silvertip shark (Carcharhinus albimarginatus)
Bignose shark	Carcharhinus altimus (S. Springer, 1950)	Bignose shark geographic range	Near threatened	2.7–2.8 m (8.9–9.2 ft) possibly 3 m (9.8 ft)	Bignose shark (Carcharhinus altimus)
Graceful shark	Carcharhinus amblyrhynchoides (Whitley, 1934)	Graceful shark geographic range	Vulnerable	1.7 m (5.6 ft)	Graceful shark (Carcharhinus amblyrhynchoides)
Grey reef shark	Carcharhinus amblyrhynchos (Bleeker, 1856)	Grey reef shark geographic range	Endangered	Mostly less than 1.9 m (6.2 ft) maximum 2.6 m (8.5 ft)	Grey reef shark (Carcharhinus amblyrhynchos)
Pigeye shark	Carcharhinus amboinensis (J. P. Müller & Henle, 1839)	Pigeye shark geographic range	Vulnerable	1.9–2.5 m (6.2–8.2 ft) max. 2.8 m (9.2 ft)	Pigeye shark (Carcharhinus amboinensis)
Borneo shark	Carcharhinus borneensis (Bleeker, 1858)	Borneo shark geographic range	Critically endangered	0.7 m (2.3 ft)	
Copper shark	Carcharhinus brachyurus (Günther, 1870)	Copper shark geographic range	Vulnerable	3.3 m (11 ft)	Copper shark (Carcharhinus brachyurus)
Spinner shark	Carcharhinus brevipinna (J. P. Müller & Henle, 1839)	Spinner shark geographic range	Vulnerable	2 m (6.6 ft) maximum 3 m (9.8 ft)	Spinner shark (Carcharhinus brevipinna)
Nervous shark	Carcharhinus cautus (Whitley, 1945)	Nervous shark geographic range	Least concern	1.0–1.3 m (3.3–4.3 ft) possibly 1.5 m (4.9 ft)	Nervous shark (Carcharhinus cautus)
Pacific smalltail shark	Carcharhinus cerdale C. H. Gilbert, 1898	Pacific smalltail shark geographic range	Critically endangered	1.4 m (4.6 ft)	Pacific smalltail shark (Carcharhinus cerdale)
Australian blackspot shark	Carcharhinus coatesi (Whitley, 1939)		Least concern	0.8 m (2.6 ft)	Australian blackspot shark (Carcharhinus coatesi)
Whitecheek shark	Carcharhinus dussumieri (J. P. Müller & Henle, 1839)	Whitecheek shark geographic range	Endangered	1 m (3.3 ft)	Whitecheek shark (Carcharhinus dussumieri)
Silky shark	Carcharhinus falciformis (J. P. Müller & Henle, 1839)	Silky shark geographic range	Vulnerable	2.5 m (8.2 ft) maximum 3.3 m (11 ft)	Silky shark (Carcharhinus falciformis)
Creek whaler	Carcharhinus fitzroyensis (Whitley, 1943)	Creek whaler geographic range	Least concern	1.0–1.3 m (3.3–4.3 ft) possibly 1.5 m (4.9 ft)	Creek whaler (Carcharhinus fitzroyensis)
Galapagos shark	Carcharhinus galapagensis (Snodgrass & Heller, 1905)	Galapagos shark geographic range	Least concern	3 m (9.8 ft) maximum 3.3 m (11 ft)	Galapagos shark (Carcharhinus galapagensis)
Pondicherry shark	Carcharhinus hemiodon (J. P. Müller & Henle, 1839)	Pondicherry shark geographic range	Critically endangered	1 m (3.3 ft)	Pondicherry shark (Carcharhinus hemiodon)
Human's whaler shark	Carcharhinus humani W. T. White & Weigmann, 2014		Data deficient	0.8 m (2.6 ft)	
Finetooth shark	Carcharhinus isodon (J. P. Müller & Henle, 1839)	Finetooth shark geographic range	Near threatened	1.6–1.7 m (5.2–5.6 ft) maximum 1.9 m (6.2 ft)	Finetooth shark (Carcharhinus isodon)
Smoothtooth blacktip shark	Carcharhinus leiodon Garrick, 1985	Smoothtooth blacktip shark geographic range	Endangered	1.2 m (3.9 ft)	Smoothtooth blacktip shark (Carcharhinus leiodon)
Bull shark	Carcharhinus leucas (J. P. Müller & Henle, 1839)	Bull shark geographic range	Vulnerable	2.3–2.4 m (7.5–7.9 ft) maximum 3.6–4.0 m (11.8–13.1 ft)	Bull shark (Carcharhinus leucas)
Blacktip shark	Carcharhinus limbatus (J. P. Müller & Henle, 1839)	Blacktip shark geographic range	Vulnerable	1.5 m (4.9 ft) maximum 2.6 m (8.5 ft)	Blacktip shark (Carcharhinus limbatus)
Oceanic whitetip shark	Carcharhinus longimanus (Poey, 1861)	Oceanic whitetip shark geographic range	Critically endangered	3 m (9.8 ft)	Oceanic whitetip shark (Carcharhinus longimanus)
Hardnose shark	Carcharhinus macloti (J. P. Müller & Henle, 1839)	Hardnose shark geographic range	Near threatened	1.1 m (3.6 ft)	Hardnose shark (Carcharhinus macloti)
Blacktip reef shark	^{T}Carcharhinus melanopterus (Quoy & Gaimard, 1824)	Blacktip reef shark geographic range	Vulnerable	1.6 m (5.2 ft) maximum 1.8 m (5.9 ft)	Blacktip reef shark (Carcharhinus melanopterus)
Dusky shark	Carcharhinus obscurus (Lesueur, 1818)	Dusky shark geographic range	Endangered	3.2 m (10 ft) maximum 4.0 m (13.1 ft)	Dusky shark (Carcharhinus obscurus)
Lost shark	Carcharhinus obsoletus White, Kyne, & Harris, 2019		Critically endangered (possibly extinct)	0.37–0.43 m (15–17 in) (juvenile length only)	
Daggernose shark	Carcharhinus oxyrhynchus (J. P. Müller & Henle, 1839)		Critically endangered	1.5 m (4.9 ft)	
Caribbean reef shark	Carcharhinus perezi (Poey, 1876)	Caribbean reef shark geographic range	Endangered	2–2.5 m (6.6–8.2 ft) maximum 3 m (9.8 ft)	Caribbean reef shark (Carcharhinus perezi)
Sandbar shark	Carcharhinus plumbeus (Nardo, 1827)	Sandbar shark geographic range	Endangered	2–2.5 m (6.6–8.2 ft)	Sandbar shark (Carcharhinus plumbeus)
Smalltail shark	Carcharhinus porosus (Ranzani, 1839)	Smalltail shark geographic range	Critically endangered	0.9–1.1 m (3.0–3.6 ft) maximum 1.5 m (4.9 ft)	Smalltail shark (Carcharhinus porosus)
Blackspot shark	Carcharhinus sealei (Pietschmann, 1913)	Blackspot shark geographic range	Vulnerable	1 m (3.3 ft)	Blackspot shark (Carcharhinus sealei)
Night shark	Carcharhinus signatus (Poey, 1868)	Night shark geographic range	Endangered	2 m (6.6 ft) maximum 2.8 m (9.2 ft)	Night shark (Carcharhinus signatus)
Spot-tail shark	Carcharhinus sorrah (J. P. Müller & Henle, 1839)	Spot-tail shark geographic range	Near threatened	1.6 m (5.2 ft)	Spot-tail shark (Carcharhinus sorrah)
Australian blacktip shark	Carcharhinus tilstoni (Whitley, 1950)	Australian blacktip shark geographic range	Least concern	1.5–1.8 m (4.9–5.9 ft) maximum 2 m (6.6 ft)	Australian blacktip shark (Carcharhinus tilstoni)
Indonesian whaler shark	Carcharhinus tjutjot (Bleeker, 1852)		Vulnerable	0.9 m (3.0 ft)	Indonesian whaler shark (Carcharhinus tjutjot)

^{T} Type species

In addition, Eschmeyer's Catalog of Fishes recognizes two species of uncertain validity:

- Carcharhinus acarenatus Moreno & Hoyos, 1983 - Native to the western Mediterranean Sea and eastern Atlantic, around the coast of the Iberian Peninsula south to Morocco. Often treated as synonymous with the copper shark.
- Carcharhinus japonicus Temminck & Schlegel, 1850 - Native to the northwestern Pacific Ocean. Often treated as synonymous with the sandbar shark.

=== Fossil ===
Age	Species	Authority	Formation	Location	Image	Notes
Montehermosan	†C. egertoni	Agassiz 1843	Onzole	Ecuador		
Pliocene	†C. egertoni	Agassiz 1843	Luanda	Angola		
Pliocene	†C. egertoni	Agassiz 1843	Villamagna	Italy		
Huayquerian	†C. egertoni	Agassiz 1843	Camacho	Uruguay		
Late Miocene	†C. egertoni	Agassiz 1843	Penedo	Portugal		
Middle Miocene	†C. egertoni	Agassiz 1843	Sekinobana	Japan		
Middle Miocene	†C. egertoni	Agassiz 1843	Suso	Japan		
Middle Miocene	†C. egertoni	Agassiz 1843	Hannoura	Japan		
Langhian	†C. egertoni	Agassiz 1843	Higashi-innai	Japan		
Colhuehuapian	†C. egertoni	Agassiz 1843	Pirabas	Brazil		
Burdigalian	†C. egertoni	Agassiz 1843	Calvert	Maryland		
Early Miocene	†C. egertoni	Agassiz 1843	Baripada	India		
Early Piacenzian	†C. priscus	Agassiz 1843	Oosterhout	Netherlands		
Montehermosan	†C. priscus	Agassiz 1843	Onzole	Ecuador		
Pliocene	†C. priscus	Agassiz 1843	Luanda	Angola		
Hemphillian	†C. priscus	Agassiz 1843	Curré	Costa Rica		
Huayquerian	†C. priscus	Agassiz 1843	Pisco	Peru		
Late Miocene	†C. priscus	Agassiz 1843	Penedo	Portugal		
Late Miocene	†C. priscus	Agassiz 1843	Uscari	Costa Rica		
Late Miocene	†C. priscus	Agassiz 1843	Fujina	Japan		
Late Miocene	†C. priscus	Agassiz 1843	Takakubo	Japan		
Badenian	†C. priscus	Agassiz 1843	Hrušky	Czech Republic		
Badenian	†C. priscus	Agassiz 1843	Korytnica	Poland		
Serravallian	†C. priscus	Agassiz 1843	Moulin de Débat	France		
Serravallian	†C. priscus	Agassiz 1843	Kurahara	Japan		
Serravallian	†C. priscus	Agassiz 1843	Wajimazaki	Japan		
Serravallian	†C. priscus	Agassiz 1843	Horimatsu	Japan		
Middle Miocene	†C. priscus	Agassiz 1843	Sekinobana	Japan		
Middle Miocene	†C. priscus	Agassiz 1843	Suso	Japan		
Middle Miocene	†C. priscus	Agassiz 1843	Hannoura	Japan		
Middle Miocene	†C. priscus	Agassiz 1843	Maenami	Japan		
Langhian	†C. priscus	Agassiz 1843	Higashi-innai	Japan		
Langhian	†C. priscus	Agassiz 1843	Florianer Schichten	Austria		
Langhian	†C. priscus	Agassiz 1843	Grund	Austria		
Langhian	†C. priscus	Agassiz 1843	Weissenegg	Austria		
Middle Miocene	†C. priscus	Agassiz 1843	Punta Judas	Costa Rica		
Burdigalian	†C. priscus	Agassiz 1843	Dera Bugti	Pakistan		
Burdigalian	†C. priscus	Agassiz 1843	Dam	Saudi Arabia		
Colhuehuapian	†C. priscus	Agassiz 1843	Pirabas	Brazil		
Aquitanian	†C. priscus	Agassiz 1843	Trent	North Carolina		
Early Miocene	†C. priscus	Agassiz 1843	Filakovo	Slovakia		
Chasicoan	†C. caquetius	Carrillo Briceño et al. 2015	Urumaco	Venezuela		
Santacrucian	†C. ackermani	Santos & Travasos 1960	Cantaure	Venezuela		
Colhuehuapian	†C. ackermani	Santos & Travasos 1960	Pirabas	Brazil		
Langhian	†C. dicelmai	Collareta et al., 2022	Cantaure	Venezuela		
Burdigalian	†C. dicelmai	Collareta et al., 2022	Chilcatay	Peru		
Burdigalian	†C. gibbesi	Woodward 1889	Trent	North Carolina		
Chattian	†C. gibbesi	Woodward 1889	Chandler Bridge	South Carolina		
Priabonian	†C. gibbesi	Woodward 1889	Clinchfield	Georgia		
Priabonian	†C. gibbesi	Woodward 1889	Yazoo	Alabama; Louisiana		
Priabonian	†C. gibbesi	Woodward 1889	Jackson Gp.	Arkansas		
Bartonian	†C. gibbesi	Woodward 1889	Gosport Sand	Alabama		
Bartonian	†C. gibbesi	Woodward 1889	Moodys Branch	Louisiana; Mississippi		
Lutetian	†C. gibbesi	Woodward 1889	Crockett	Texas		
Priabonian	†C. underwoodi	Samonds et al, 2019	Mahajanga Basin	Madagascar		
Bartonian	†C. underwoodi	Samonds et al, 2019	Mahajanga Basin	Madagascar		
Rupelian	†C. balochenisis	Adnet et al. 2007	Chitarwata	Pakistan		
Rupelian	†C. perseus	Adnet et al. 2007	Chitarwata	Pakistan		
Rupelian	†C. perseus	Adnet et al. 2007	Minqar Tabaghbagh	Egypt		
Bartonian	†C. nigeriensis	White 1926	Ameki	Nigeria		
Bartonian	†C. tingae	Cicimurri & Ebersole, 2021	Cook Mountain	Louisiana		

== Gallery ==
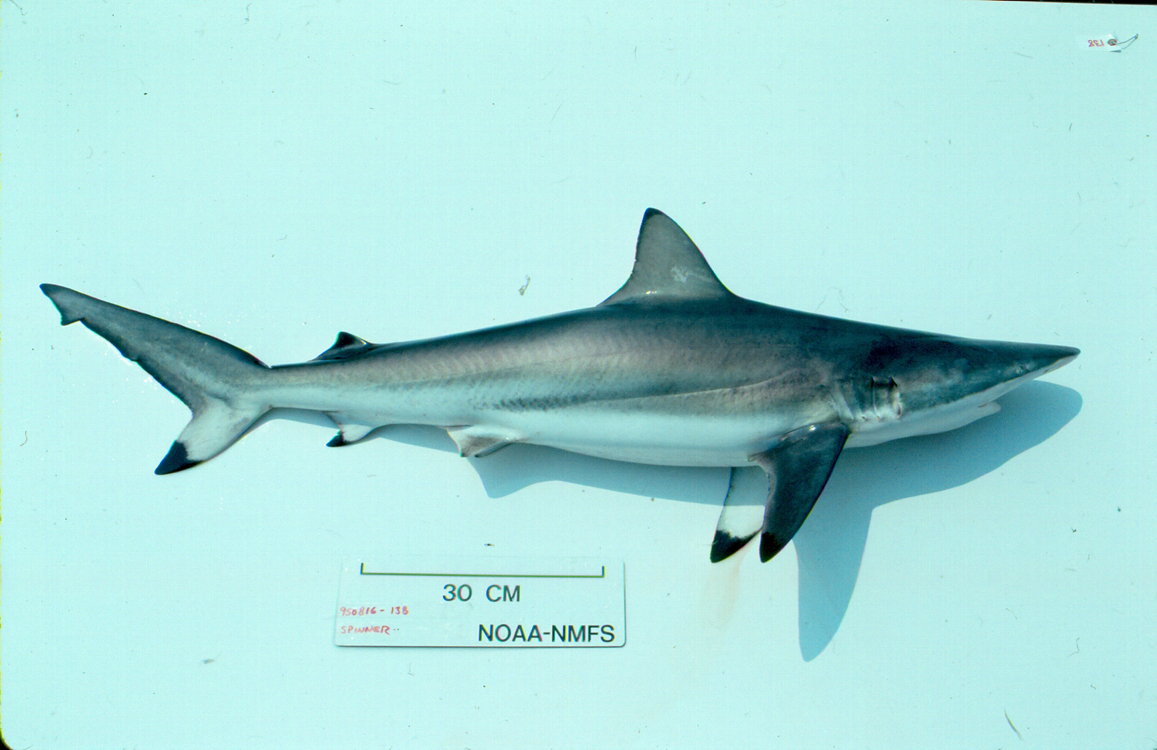

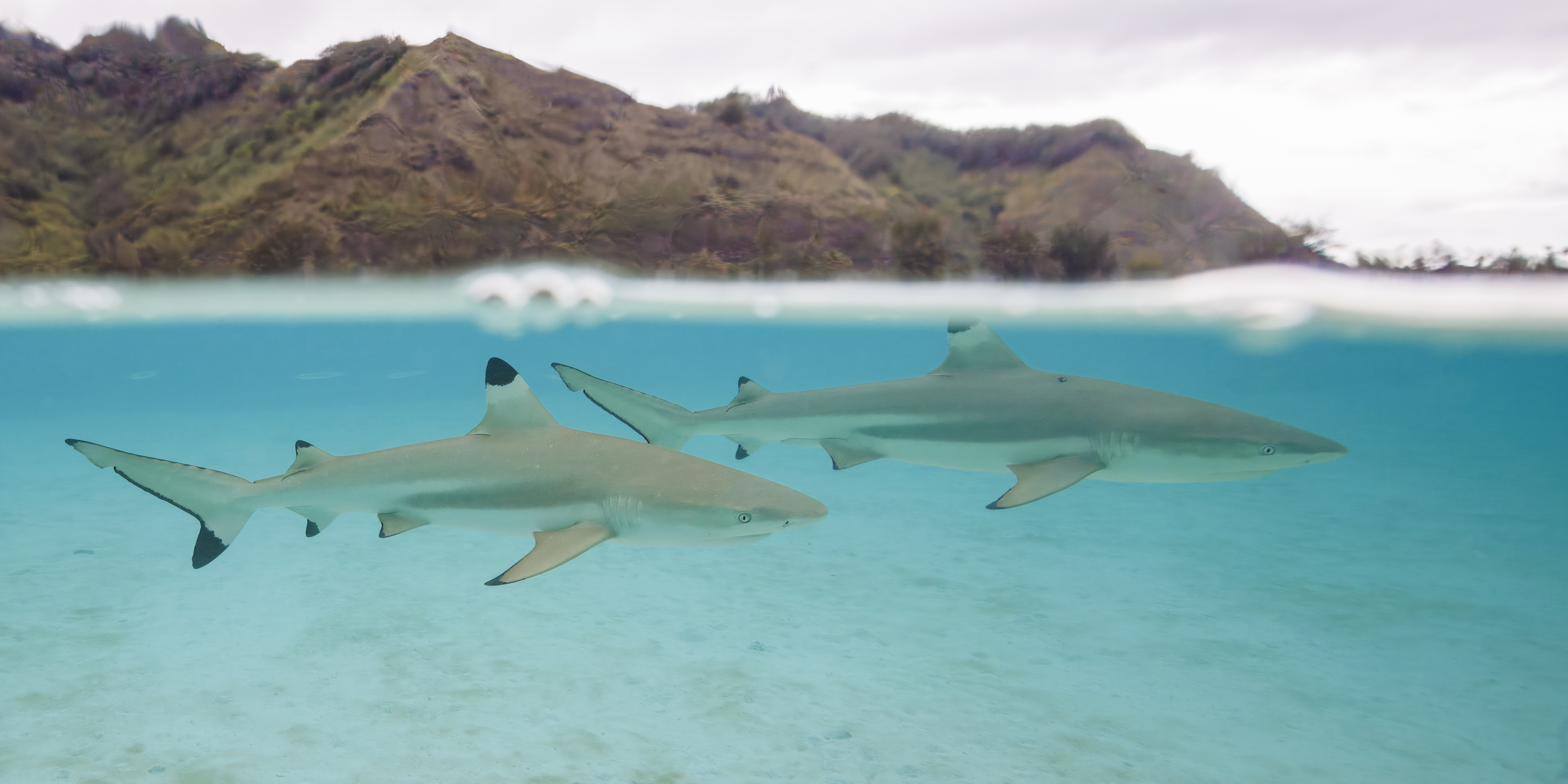

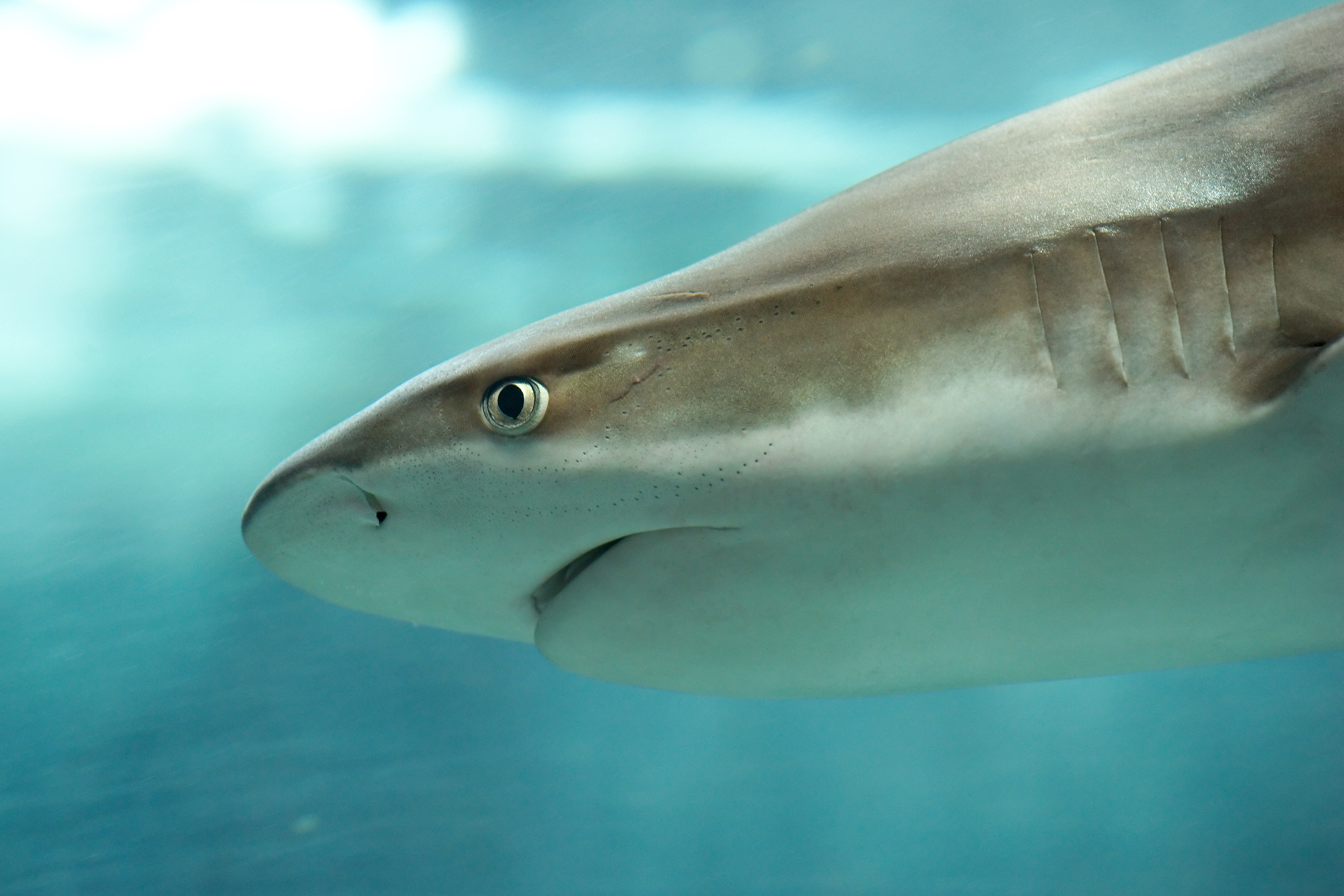

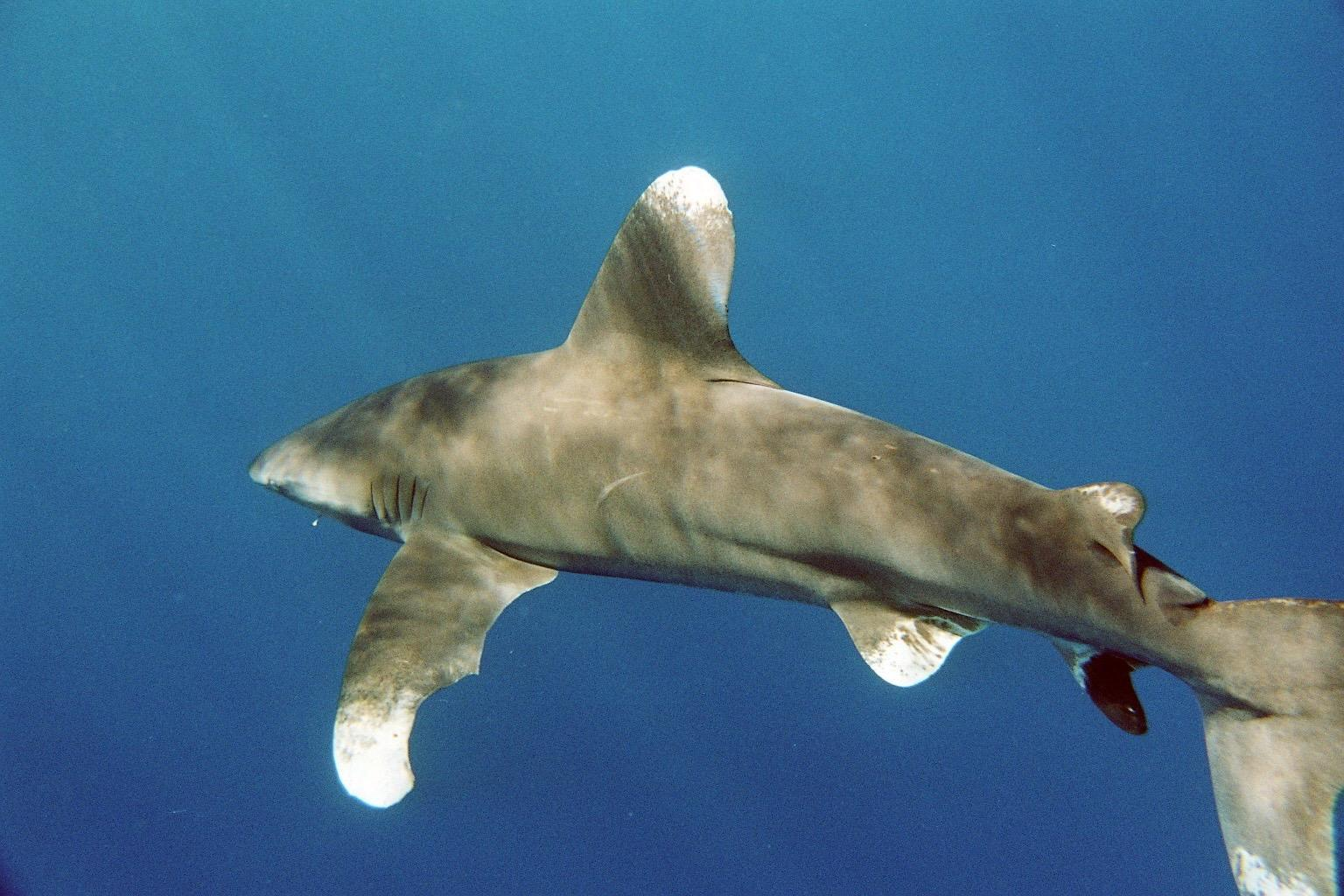

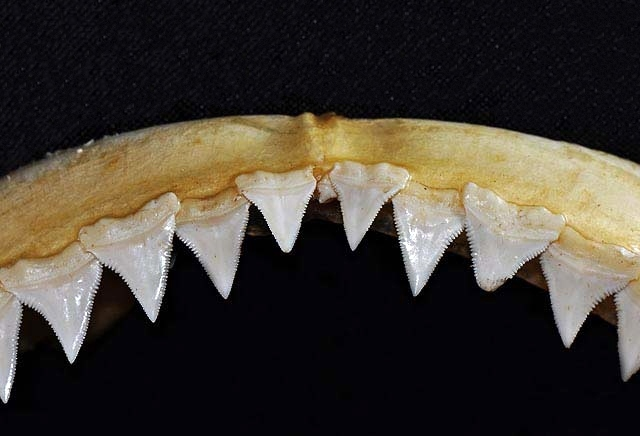

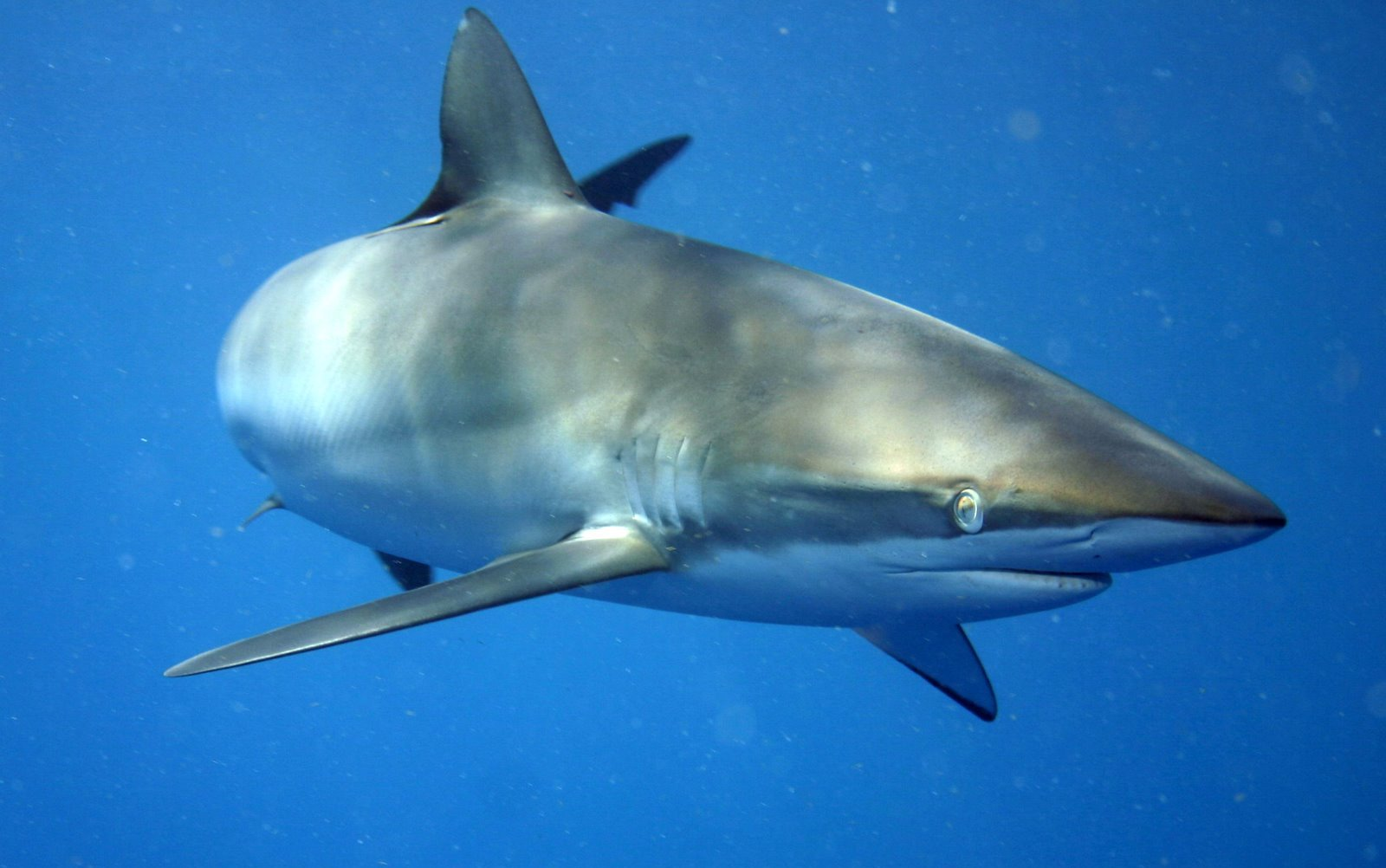

== See also ==
- List of prehistoric cartilaginous fish genera
