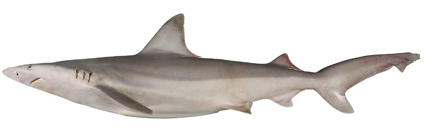

Conservation status
- Least Concern (IUCN 3.1)

Scientific classification
- Kingdom: Animalia
- Phylum: Chordata
- Class: Chondrichthyes
- Subclass: Elasmobranchii
- Division: Selachii
- Order: Carcharhiniformes
- Family: Carcharhinidae
- Genus: Carcharhinus
- Species: C. fitzroyensis

Binomial name
- Carcharhinus fitzroyensis (Whitley, 1943)
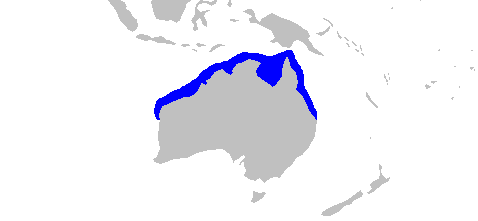
- Range of the creek whaler

Synonyms
- Galeolamna fitzroyensis Whitley, 1943

= Creek whaler =

Species of shark

The creek whaler (Carcharhinus fitzroyensis) is a common species of requiem shark, and part of the family Carcharhinidae, endemic to northern Australia. It frequents shallow waters close to shore, including estuaries. This small, stocky shark usually grows to 1.0–1.3 m (3.3–4.3 ft) long and is brownish in color without conspicuous fin markings. It can be identified by its long snout, large, triangular pectoral fins, and large, anteriorly positioned first dorsal fin.

The diet of the creek whaler consists mainly of small teleost fishes and crustaceans. It is viviparous, with the unborn young being sustained through a placental connection. The defined mating season lasts from May to July. Females give birth to one to seven pups annually, following a gestation period of seven to 9 months. A small number of creek whalers are caught incidentally in inshore gillnets and used for food, but the effect of fishing on its population seems to be inconsequential. As a result, the IUCN has listed this species under Least Concern.

== Taxonomy and phylogeny ==
The creek whaler was described by Australian ichthyologist Gilbert Percy Whitley in a 1943 volume of Proceedings of the Linnean Society of New South Wales. He assigned the new species to the subgenus Uranganops of the genus Galeolamna, and gave it the specific epithet fitzroyensis because the type specimen, a 1.2-m-long female, was collected from Connor's Creek in the Fitzroy River estuary. Subsequent authors have synonymized Galeolamna with Carcharhinus.

The evolutionary relationships of the creek whaler have yet to be fully resolved. In comparative morphological studies published by Jack Garrick in 1982 and Leonard Compagno in 1988, it was tentatively placed in a grouping defined by the whitecheek shark (C. dussumieri) and the blackspot shark (C. sealei). Shane Lavery, in a 1992 study based on allozymes, reported that this species was close to the nervous shark (C. cautus) and the blacktip reef shark (C. melanopterus). Ximena Vélez-Zuazoa and Ingi Agnarsson, in a 2011 study based on nuclear and mitochondrial genes, found it to be the basal member of a clade also containing the graceful shark (C. amblyrhynchoides), the blacktip shark (C. limbatus), and the Australian blacktip shark (C. tilstoni).

== Description ==
The body of the creek whaler is spindle-shaped and rather stocky. The long snout has a narrowly parabolic shape and large nostrils preceded by small, nipple-shaped flaps of skin. The eyes are circular and of medium size, and are equipped with nictitating membranes. The arched mouth has very short furrows at the corners. There are 30 upper and 28–30 lower tooth rows. The upper teeth are long and triangular with strongly serrated edges, and become increasing angled towards the sides of the jaw. The lower teeth are slender and upright with finely serrated edges. The five pairs of gill slits are short.

The pectoral fins are distinctively large and triangular, with rounded to pointed tips. The large first dorsal fin originates over the rear of the pectoral fin bases. The second dorsal fin is relatively tall and long, and originates over or slightly behind the anal fin origin. There is no ridge between the dorsal fins. The anal fin is larger than the second dorsal fin. There is a crescent-shaped notch on the caudal peduncle just before the origin of the upper caudal fin lobe. The asymmetrical caudal fin has a well-developed lower lobe and a longer upper lobe with a ventral notch near the tip. The skin is densely covered by overlapping dermal denticles, each bearing three to five horizontal ridges leading to marginal teeth. This species is bronze to brownish gray above and pale below, and lacks an obvious lighter band on the flanks. Rarely, individuals may be light bluish gray above. It may reach 1.5 m (4.9 ft) in length, though 1.0–1.3 m (3.3–4.3 ft) is typical.

== Distribution and habitat ==
The range of the creek whaler is restricted to northern Australia, between Gladstone in central Queensland and Cape Cuvier in Western Australia. It is a common species that inhabits estuaries and inshore waters from the intertidal zone to a depth of at least 40 m (130 ft).

== Biology and ecology ==
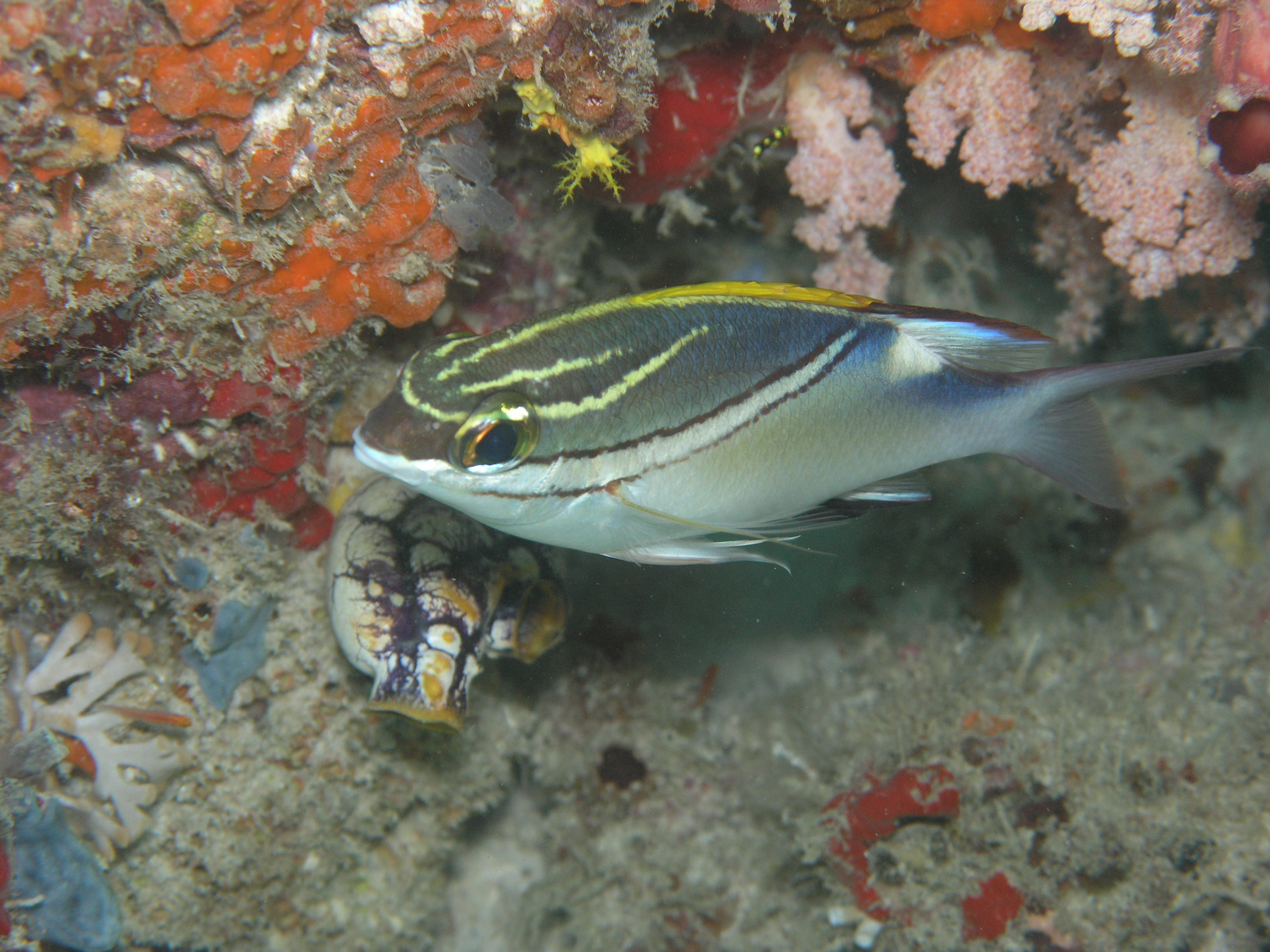
Threadfin breams are among the prey taken by the creek whaler.

The creek whaler feeds predominantly on small teleost fishes (including threadfin breams and lizardfishes) and crustaceans (including penaeid prawns and mantis shrimps); cephalopods are also infrequently consumed. Known parasites of this species include the tapeworm Callitetrarhynchus gracilis, and a nematode in the genus Pulchrascaris.

Like other members of its family, the creek whaler is viviparous, with the developing embryos receiving nourishment from the mother through a placental connection formed from the depleted yolk sac. Females produce litters of one to seven young every year. Mating occurs between May and July, with the females storing the sperm until ovulation takes place between July and September. After a gestation period of seven to 9 months, birthing occurs between February and May of the following year. The newborns measure 35–50 cm (14–20 in) long and spend their first few months of life in shallow, inshore nursery areas such as Cleveland Bay in north Queensland. Males and females attain sexual maturity at lengths of around 83–88 cm (33–35 in) and 90–100 cm (35–39 in), respectively.

== Human interactions ==
The creek whaler is a minor bycatch of inshore gillnet fisheries operating in northern Australia; the meat is sold for human consumption. Given its relatively high reproductive rate, its population appears capable of withstanding present levels of fishing. Therefore, the IUCN has listed this species under Least Concern.
