= Lost shark =

Conservation status
- Critically endangered, possibly extinct (IUCN 3.1)

Scientific classification
- Kingdom: Animalia
- Phylum: Chordata
- Class: Chondrichthyes
- Subclass: Elasmobranchii
- Division: Selachii
- Order: Carcharhiniformes
- Family: Carcharhinidae
- Genus: Carcharhinus
- Species: C. obsoletus

Binomial name
- Carcharhinus obsoletus White, Kyne, & Harris, 2019

Synonyms
- Carcharhinus obsolerus (lapsus)

Species of shark

The lost shark (Carcharhinus obsoletus), (Note: Originally described using the incorrect spelling Carcharhinus obsolerus) previously known as the false smalltail shark, is a possibly extinct species of requiem shark (family Carcharhinidae). It is known only from the Western Central Pacific Ocean, in the southern South China Sea.

== History ==
Only three specimens of this species are known, found in Borneo, Vietnam, and Thailand, all of which are over 80 years old. The specimens were originally tentatively assigned as belonging to the smalltail shark (C. porosus), but a number of subtle morphometric differences revealed that they belonged to a new Carcharinus species, referred to as Carcharinus sp. A. It differs from other Carcharinus species by the relative position of the second dorsal and anal fins, as well as its low vertebral count.

== Conservation status ==
As no individuals have been identified for over 80 years, C. obsoletus may be extinct. Like other members of the C. porosus subgroup, C. obsoletus likely had limited fecundity and lived in shallow waters that are easily accessed by fishermen, both of which put it at heavy risk of extinction from overfishing. However, the rediscovery of the Borneo shark (C. borneensis) in 2004 after a long period of no sightings has kept hopes for its possible survival. But in 2020, the IUCN Red List declared the lost shark to be Critically Endangered or Possibly Extinct.
