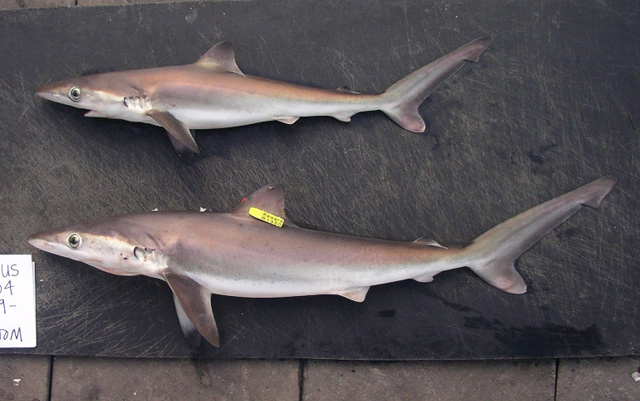

Conservation status
- Endangered (IUCN 3.1)

Scientific classification
- Kingdom: Animalia
- Phylum: Chordata
- Class: Chondrichthyes
- Subclass: Elasmobranchii
- Division: Selachii
- Order: Carcharhiniformes
- Family: Carcharhinidae
- Genus: Carcharhinus
- Species: C. signatus

Binomial name
- Carcharhinus signatus (Poey, 1868)
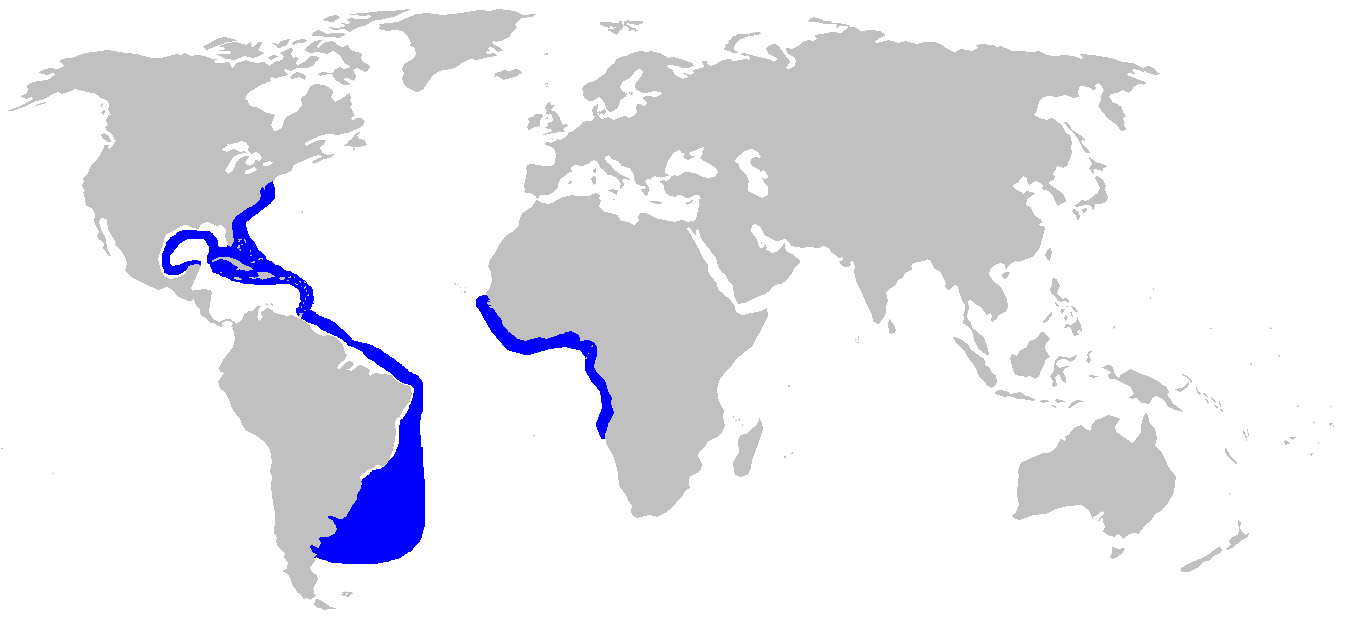
- Range of the night shark

Synonyms
- Hypoprion bigelowi Cadenat, 1956; Hypoprion longirostris Poey, 1876; Hypoprion signatus Poey, 1868

= Night shark =

Species of shark

The night shark (Carcharhinus signatus) is a species of requiem shark, in the family Carcharhinidae, found in the temperate and tropical waters of the Atlantic Ocean. An inhabitant of the outer continental shelf and upper continental slope, this shark most commonly occurs at depths of 50–600 m (160–1,970 ft) and conducts a diel vertical migration, spending the day in deeper water and moving into shallower waters at night. Off northeastern Brazil, large numbers congregate around seamounts of varying depths. A slender, streamlined species, the night shark typically reaches a length of 2 m (6.6 ft). It can be identified by its long, pointed snout and large, green eyes (when alive), and is dark grayish blue or brown above and white below.

Night sharks are quick, nocturnally active, schooling predators that feed mainly on small bony fishes and squid. Reproduction is viviparous as with the other members of its family; females mate during the summer and give birth to litters of usually 12–18 pups after a gestation period of a year. This deepwater species is not known to pose a danger to humans. It is caught incidentally by commercial tuna and swordfish longline fisheries in the western Atlantic, and also by a targeted longline fishery operating off northeastern Brazil. The night shark is highly valued for its fins, and additionally as a source of meat, liver oil, and fishmeal. However, most sharks caught off northeastern Brazil have been found to contain unsafe concentrations of mercury.

Because of its low reproductive rate and historically documented declines in areas such as the Caribbean, the night shark has been assessed as vulnerable by the American Fisheries Society. A population assessment has indicated that this species is secure in the waters off the United States, but this may not be true elsewhere.

== Taxonomy ==
The first scientific description of the night shark was published by Cuban zoologist Felipe Poey in 1868, as part of a series of papers entitled Repertorio fisico-natural de la isla de Cuba. He based his description on a single set of jaws and gave it the name Hypoprion signatus. In 1973, Leonard Compagno synonymized the genus Hypoprion with Carcharhinus. No type specimen has been designated for this species. Its common name is because it is mostly captured at night.

== Distribution and habitat ==
The distribution of the night shark extends along the outer continental shelves and upper continental slopes of the Atlantic Ocean, from the U.S. state of Massachusetts to Argentina in the west, including the Gulf of Mexico and the Caribbean Sea, and from Senegal to northern Namibia in the east. In United States waters, it is relatively common off North Carolina and Florida (particularly the Florida Straits) and rarer elsewhere. There are questionable reports of this species off the Pacific coast of Panama.

The night shark is a deepwater species that has been reported from as far down as 2 km (1.2 mi), though it occasionally ventures to within 26 m (85 ft) of the surface. Off the southeastern United States, it is usually caught at a depth range of 50–600 m (160–1,970 ft). Off northeastern Brazil, the night shark is most commonly found near the summits of seamounts ranging from 38 to 370 m (125 to 1,214 ft) deep. Off West Africa, it occurs at depths of 90–285 m (295–935 ft), where the temperature is 11–16 °C (52–61 °F), the salinity is 36 ppt, and the dissolved oxygen level is 1.81 mL/L. Annual variation in Cuban catch rates may indicate a seasonal migration.

== Description ==
The night shark has a slender build with an elongated, pointed snout. The nares are flanked by moderately developed flaps of skin. The eyes are large, circular, and green in life, with irregularly shaped pupils and a nictitating membrane (protective third eyelid). The mouth lacks conspicuous furrows at the corners and usually bears 15 tooth rows on either side of both jaws, plusone to two upper and one lower symphysial (jaw midline) tooth rows. Each upper tooth has a smooth to serrated edge, a narrow cusp becoming more oblique towards the corner of the mouth, and two to five coarse serrations at the base of the trailing margin. The number and size of serrations on the leading margin of the tooth cusp increase relative to those on the trailing margin as the animal grows older. The lower teeth are upright and smooth-edged. The five pairs of gill slits are rather short.

The pectoral fins are less than a fifth as long as the total body length and taper towards a somewhat rounded tip. The first dorsal fin is relatively small, triangular, and pointed, originating over the free rear tips of the pectoral fins. The second dorsal fin is much smaller than the first and originates over or slightly ahead of the anal fin. A ridge runs between the dorsal fins. The dermal denticles are not tightly packed and overlap each other minimally. Each denticle is diamond-shaped with horizontal ridges leading to marginal teeth, the number increasing from three in juveniles to five to seven in adults. The coloration is grayish blue or brown above and whitish below, without fin markings. A faint band occurs on each side and sometimes small black spots are scattered over the back. This species usually grows to 2.0 m (6.6 ft) long, but has been recorded reaching a length and weight of 2.8 m (9.2 ft) and 76.7 kg (169 lb), respectively.

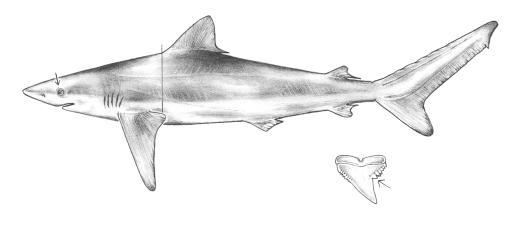
Drawing of a night shark and its tooth

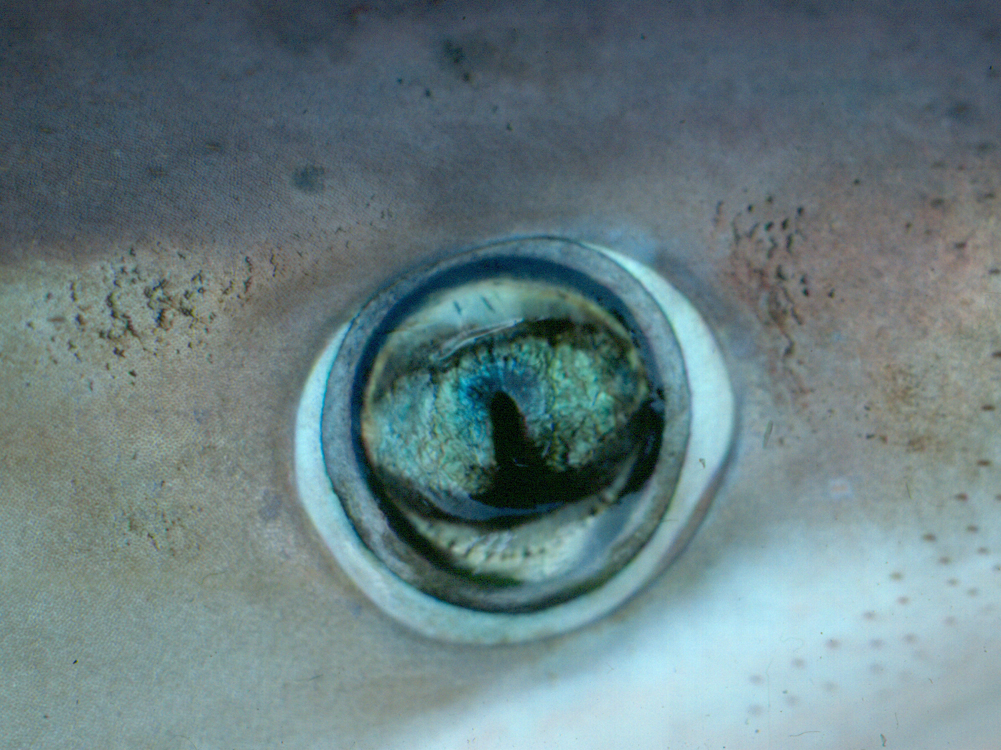
The eyes of the night shark are bright green in life

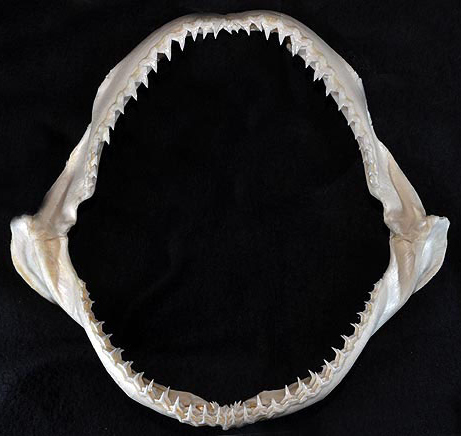
Jaws

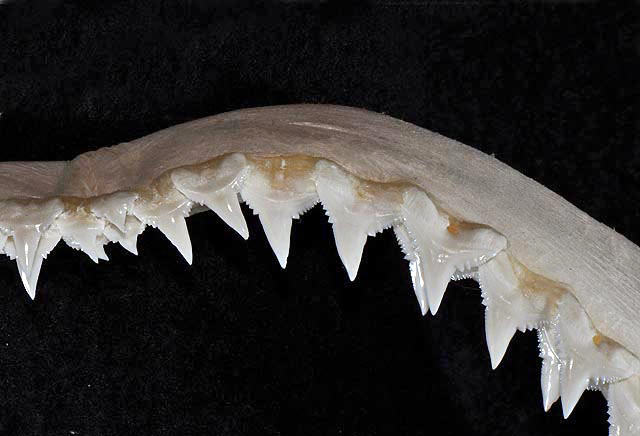
Upper teeth

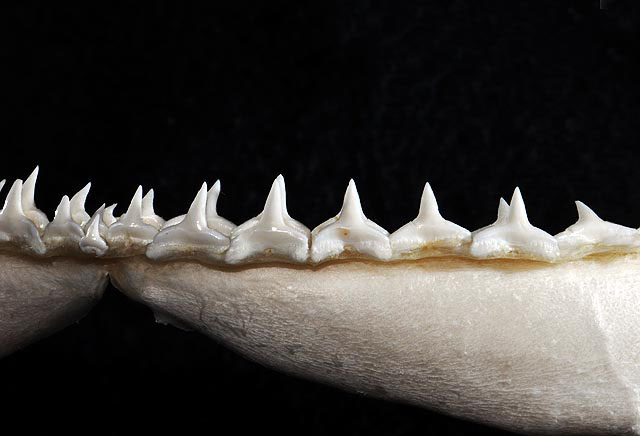
Lower teeth

== Biology and ecology ==
Fast and energetic, the night shark feeds primarily on small, active bony fishes such as mullet, mackerel, butterfish, sea basses, and flyingfish. Squid and shrimp are also sometimes taken. Most feeding activity occurs at night, hence its common name, with peaks at dawn and dusk. Catch records indicate that this species is usually found in schools and conducts a diel vertical migration, spending the day at a depth of 275–366 m (902–1,201 ft) and moving up to shallower than 183 m (600 ft) at night. Ovulating and gravid females are rarely ever caught, suggesting that during this period, they may stop feeding or segregate themselves from others of their species. Potential predators of the night shark include larger sharks. Known parasites include the copepods Kroyeria caseyi, which attach to the gills, Pandarus bicolor and P. smithii, which infest the skin, and the tapeworms Heteronybelinia yamagutii, H. nipponica and Progrillotia dollfusi, which are found in the spiral valve intestine. Another parasite is an undescribed isopod similar to Aega webbii. The common remora (Remora remora) may be found attached to this species.

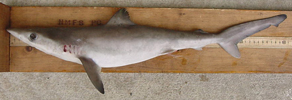
A juvenile night shark: After birth, young sharks grow quickly, thereby reducing their risk of predation.

Like other members of its family, the night shark is viviparous; once the developing embryos exhaust their supply of yolk, the depleted yolk sac is converted into a placental connection through which the mother delivers nourishment. Adult females have a single functional ovary (on the right) and two functional uteri, which are divided into separate compartments for each embryo. Within the uterus, the embryos lie lengthwise with their heads pointing the same direction as their mother. Most information known about the night shark's life history comes from the subpopulation off northeastern Brazil, and may not hold true in other parts of the species range. Northeastern Brazilian sharks mate throughout the summer, with the male biting at the female's body and fins as a prelude to copulation.

After a year-long gestation period, females give birth to four to 18 (usually 12 or more) pups. Embryos at varying stages of development have been found in both February and June, suggesting that the parturition takes place over a span of several months. An important nursery area is believed to exist at the continental shelf break at 34°S latitude, near the southern extreme of this species' range. The newborn young measure 50–72 cm (20–28 in) long, and add around 25 cm (9.8 in) or 38% of their body length in their first year. This fast rate of growth serves to shorten the period immediately after birth when the small pups are most vulnerable to predators, a strategy similar to that employed by the silky shark (C. falciformis). By the time the sharks reach adulthood, their growth rate slows to a more modest 8.6 cm (3.4 in) per year. No difference is seen in growth rate between sexes. Males mature sexually at a length of 1.8–1.9 m (5.9–6.2 ft), corresponding to an age of 8 years, and females at a length of 2.0–2.1 m (6.6–6.9 ft), corresponding to an age of 10 years. The oldest known individuals are 17 years old; based on growth curves, their maximum lifespan has been estimated at 28 years for males and 30 years for females.

== Human interactions ==
Because of its deepwater habitat, the night shark is not known to pose a danger to humans. This species is prized for its large fins, which are exported for use in shark fin soup, and is also used as a source of meat, liver oil, and fishmeal. Traditionally, it has comprised a part of the bycatch of pelagic longline fisheries targeting swordfish (Xiphias gladius) and tuna in the western Atlantic. Since 1991, it has also been the focus of a longline fishery operating over seamounts off northeastern Brazil, where large numbers of sharks congregate and are easily captured. Some 90% of the seamount shark and ray catch in this area now consists of night sharks; of those, about 89% are juveniles. However, a study has found that night sharks from off northeastern Brazil accumulate high levels of mercury within their bodies, likely from their piscivorous diet. Some 92% of sharks examined contained mercury levels higher than that allowed for marketed carnivorous fish set by the Brazilian legislature, and the average mercury concentration was 1.742 mg/kg. Therefore, eating only 0.1 kg (0.22 lb) of night shark meat per day could result in the ingestion of several times the daily mercury content judged safe by the World Health Organization.

The International Union for Conservation of Nature has assessed the night shark globally as Endangered, citing its slow reproductive rate and historical declines under fishing pressure. It has also been listed as vulnerable by the American Fisheries Society. This species was once a significant part of the Cuban artisanal shark fishery, comprising 60–75% of the catch from 1937 to 1941, before its numbers dropped substantially in the 1970s. Similarly, the proportion of night sharks in the shark catch of the southeastern U.S. pelagic longline fishery fell from 26.1% from 1981 to 1983 to 0.3–3.3% in 1993 and 1994; a comparable decline was observed in catches by South Florida marlin tournaments since the 1970s. Currently, the intense Brazilian targeted fishery is of particular concern, although fishing pressure on the night shark may be relaxing as the fishery is beginning to shift towards swordfish and bigeye tuna (Thunnus obesus). No fishery information on the night shark is available for the eastern Atlantic, leading to an IUCN assessment of data deficient for that region.

In 1997, the U.S. National Oceanographic and Atmospheric Administration National Marine Fisheries Service (NMFS) listed the night shark as a "Species of Concern", meaning that it merits conservation concern but there is insufficient evidence for listing on the Endangered Species Act (ESA). In 1999, the NMFS Fishery Management Plan (FMP) of the Atlantic tunas, swordfish, and sharks was revised to prohibit the retention of 19 species, including the night shark. The prohibition of this species was upheld by Amendment 1 of the FMP, added in 2003. Night sharks suffer high bycatch mortality on longlines, and prohibited or not, some are kept by fishers because of their value and the difficulty of identifying disembodied parts to species. Nevertheless, a 2003–2008 NMFS population assessment concluded that night shark population in United States waters has stabilized (perhaps even increasing) and no longer merits categorization as a "species of concern", though recommended that the prohibition on retention be maintained as a precautionary measure. This species should also benefit from the imposition of time/area closures in the Florida Straits and on the Charleston Bump. Off Brazil and elsewhere, fishing continues largely unmanaged. IUCN members have urged that Brazil improve catch monitoring and enforcement of existing regulations, declare some critical habitat off-limits, and implement the Brazilian National Plan of Action for Sharks (NPOA-Sharks) under the FAO International Plan of Action for the Conservation and Management of Sharks.
