= New Zealand lanternshark =

Scientific classification
- Kingdom: Animalia
- Phylum: Chordata
- Class: Chondrichthyes
- Subclass: Elasmobranchii
- Division: Selachii
- Order: Squaliformes
- Family: Etmopteridae
- Genus: Etmopterus
- Species: E. baxteri

Binomial name
- Etmopterus baxteri Garrick, 1957
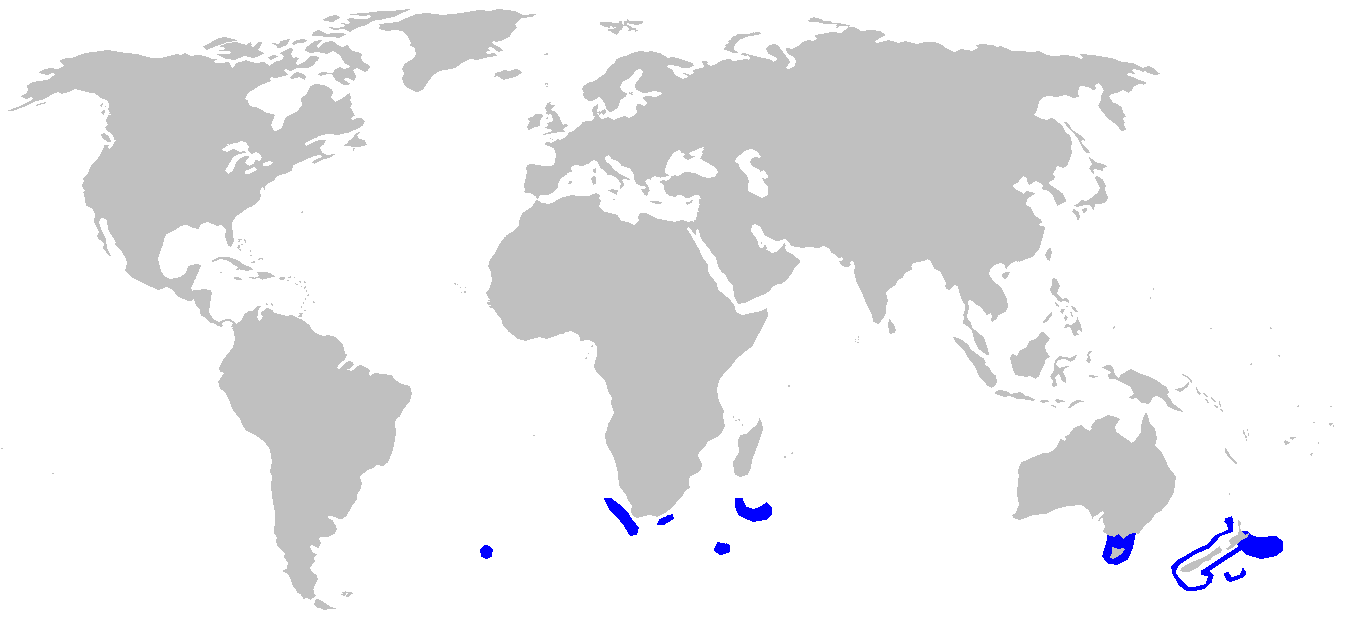
- Distribution

Species of shark

The New Zealand lanternshark (Etmopterus baxteri) is a shark of the family Etmopteridae mainly found off the coast of New Zealand. It can also be found in the Southern areas of Australia and Africa, inhabiting water depths between 500-1500m. These sharks can be commonly known as Baxter's dogfish and giant lantern shark. According to the New Zealand Threat Classification System (NZTCS), this species conservation status is considered non-threatened.

== Diet ==
These sharks mainly feed on teleost fish, cephalopods, and occasionally decapod crustaceans.

== Physical traits ==
They can reach lengths up to 70-88 cm (about 2.89 ft) and achieve maturity by growing to certain sizes. The females mature at 63 cm and males at 54 cm. Being oviparous they can produce 6-16 pups each reproductive cycle.

These sharks are a dark brown or black color with an even darker underbelly and markers for the caudal and pelvic fins. Due to these darker markings the pelvic fin marking can be seen stretching from the base of the fin to the flank as well as a small triangular-like split near the rear. Their snout and build are short and their eyes are large. The exterior appears rough because of the varying placement of the dermal denticles that can appear almost anywhere except on the dorsal fins. They have two dorsal fins with the second fin being the larger and longer of the two. This second fin also contains a second spine that curves and becomes more curved throughout their life.

=== Teeth structure ===
The tooth structure of these sharks can help distinguish them from other sharks as well as each other. While the lower jaw of teeth shows no differences between sexes, the upper jaw does. Females have been shown to have lanceolate central cusps to support their teeth. Males only have central cusps in a narrow structure.

=== Species similarities ===
Due to some similar morphological traits, the New Zealand Lantern shark can often be confused with the Southern Lantern shark and are thought to be connected to one another. The largest piece of evidence for this connection is that both sharks have dermal denticles that are consistently conical-cusped and are randomly distributed. Other evidence includes having a similar curved spine on juvenile's dorsal fin and flank markings. Despite all the similarities, The Southern Lantern shark is mainly located off the South American coast as opposed to the New Zealand coast.
