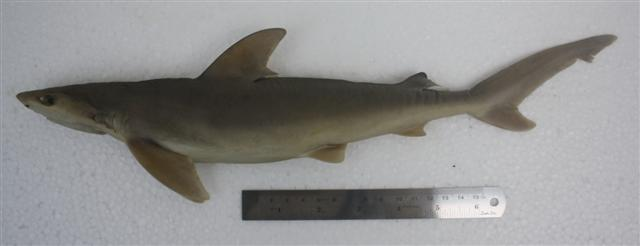

Conservation status
- Vulnerable (IUCN 3.1)

Scientific classification
- Kingdom: Animalia
- Phylum: Chordata
- Class: Chondrichthyes
- Subclass: Elasmobranchii
- Division: Selachii
- Order: Carcharhiniformes
- Family: Carcharhinidae
- Genus: Carcharhinus
- Species: C. sealei

Binomial name
- Carcharhinus sealei (Pietschmann, 1913)
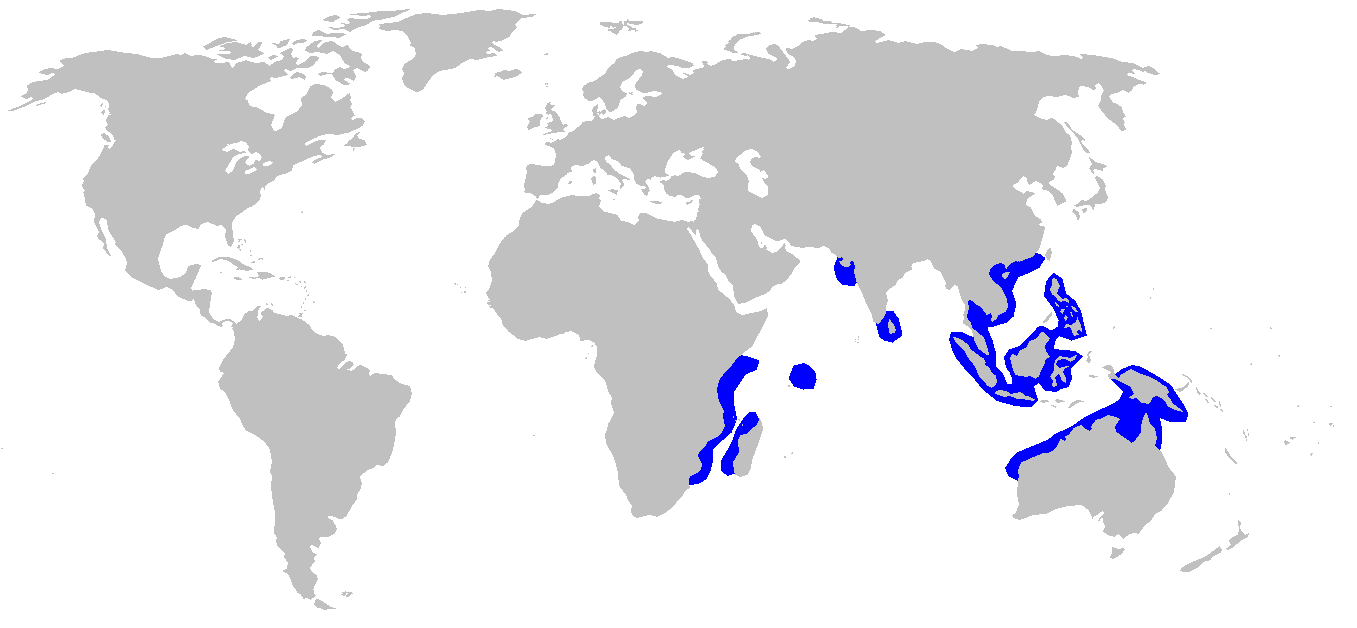

Synonyms
- Carcharhinus menisorrah (Müller & Henle, 1839); Carcharias borneensis Seale, 1910; Carcharias sealei Pietschmann, 1913; Platypodon coatesi Whitley, 1939

= Blackspot shark =

Blackspot shark Temporal range: Late Miocene to present

Species of shark

The blackspot shark (Carcharhinus sealei) is a small species of requiem shark in the family Carcharhinidae found in the tropical Indo-West Pacific Ocean between latitudes 24°N and 30°S, from the surface to a depth around 40 m (130 ft). Its length is a little under one meter (yard) and it is not considered to be dangerous to humans. It feeds mainly on fish, crustaceans, and squid. This shark is also caught in small-scale fisheries for human consumption.

Fossil teeth of the blackspot shark are known from the Late Miocene of Brunei, representing the oldest known record of the species.

== Description ==
The blackspot shark is a relatively slender species with a streamlined appearance, growing to a length around 95 cm (37 in). The snout is fairly long, pointed or slightly rounded at the tip. The eyes are large, oval, and set horizontally, and are protected by a nictitating membrane on the lower side. The flaps of skin beside the nostrils are triangular, and the furrows on the upper lip are short. Usually, 12 tooth rows occur on either side of both top and bottom jaws, but the number can vary from 11 to 13. The upper teeth have strongly serrated oblique cusps and smooth-edged cusplets, and the lower teeth have oblique cusps, either serrated or smooth. The hindermost of the five gill slits is above the origin of the pectoral fins, and no spiracles occur. The first dorsal fin is long, narrow, and curved (falcate) and has a short rear tip. It is either pointed or narrowly rounded at the apex and its origin is directly over the free posterior end of the pectoral fins. The second dorsal fin is relatively large. It also has a short rear tip and its origin is slightly behind the origin of the anal fin. The pectoral fins are falcate, long and narrow, and taper to a blunt point. No fleshy keel exists along the sides of the caudal peduncle. The caudal fin is about one-fifth of the total length of the shark, the dorsal lobe is elongated and has a notch in the lower margin near the tip and the ventral lobe is smaller, markedly falcate, and has a more rounded tip. The body colour is brownish or silvery grey on the dorsal surface and pale grey on the ventral surface, with an inconspicuous pale stripe running along the flank. A large, triangular black spot is on the second dorsal fin which covers at least half of the fin. The other fins have no distinctive markings, but do have pale posterior edges.

The blackspot shark can be confused with the whitecheek shark (Carcharhinus dussumieri), but that species has a triangular first dorsal fin that is only slightly falcate, and a small second dorsal fin that merely has a dark margin.

== Distribution ==
The blackspot shark is native to the Indian and Pacific Oceans, where it is found on the continental shelves and shallow water around islands from the surf line to depths of about 40 m (130 ft). It is not usually found in estuaries and may be intolerant of low-salinity water. In the Indian Ocean, it is found along the east coast of Africa from South Africa and Madagascar to Kenya. It is present in the water around the Seychelles and Mauritius, and further east, it is present around the coasts of Pakistan, India, and Sri Lanka. In the western Pacific Ocean, it is found along the coasts of Thailand, Vietnam, China, Indonesia, New Guinea, and northern and western Australia. In South Africa, the species seems to be resident, but some increase in numbers occurs during the summer.

== Biology ==
The blackspot shark feeds on small fish, crustaceans, and squid, and is not dangerous to man. It is a fast-growing, short-lived species. It is mature at about one year old at a length around 70 cm (28 in) and can live for five years or more. Like other members of its genus, the blackspot shark is viviparous. The gestation period is about 9 months and one or two offspring develop at one time in the uterus. At first, the embryos are sustained by a yolk sac, but later a placenta develops. Off the coast of Natal, the juvenile sharks are born in spring.

== Status ==
The blackspot shark is listed as vulnerable by the IUCN in its Red List of Threatened Species. Detailed surveys of population size have not been done, but the population is believed to be in decline. The shallow waters in which the fish live are intensively fished with longlines and gillnets, and the blackspot shark may be overexploited through overfishing. It is sold in local markets and its flesh is used for human consumption.
