= Jack Garrick =

New Zealand ichthyologist

John Andrew Frank Garrick (24 March 1928 – 30 August 2018) was a New Zealand ichthyologist.

== Career ==
Garrick specialised in elasmobranchs and published many books and articles about shark and ray biology. In 1982, he published a thorough taxonomy on sharks of the genus Carcharhinus, where he identified the smoothtooth blacktip shark as a new species. He is the species authority for several types of sharks, including the New Zealand lanternshark. Garrick was a zoology professor at Victoria University of Wellington, appointed to a personal chair in 1971.

Garrick had a primary interest in the taxonomy of sharks and rays, and carried out the first exploratory deep-sea sampling using specially adapted cone nets, baited traps, and longlines, regularly to depths greater than 2000 metres. Many new and rare species were obtained by use of these innovative techniques. He was responsible for the notable discovery of the first New Zealand specimens of orange roughy in 1957 (which subsequently formed the basis of a multimillion-dollar fishery). Garrick collected some 721 specimens in 988 lots and deposited them at Te Papa.

== Taxa named in his honour ==
Garrick discovered the first known specimens of the northern river shark, a species that was eventually named after him, and which featured on an episode of the show River Monsters. Garrick's catshark Apristurus garricki was also named in his honour.

== Taxa described by him ==
- See Category:Taxa named by Jack Garrick
