= Leonard Compagno =

American shark ichthyologist

Leonard Joseph Victor Compagno (4 December 1943 in San Francisco – 25 September 2024) was an international authority on shark taxonomy and the author of many scientific papers and books on the subject, best known of which is his 1984 catalogue of shark species produced for the Food and Agriculture Organization (FAO) of the United Nations. Compagno was mentioned in the credits of the 1975 film Jaws along with the National Geographic Society.

== Career ==
- Ph.D, Stanford University, 1979
- Adjunct professor, San Francisco State University, 1979 to 1985
- Curator of Fishes in the Division of Life Sciences and Head of the Shark Research Centre (SRC), Iziko Museums, Cape Town
- Director, Shark Research Institute (SRI)

== Selected bibliography ==
- Compagno, L.J.V., 1979. Carcharhinoid sharks: morphology, systematics and phylogeny. Unpublished Ph. D. Thesis, Stanford University, 932 p. Available from University Microfilms International, Ann Arbor, Michigan.
- Leonard Compagno, 1984a. FAO species catalogue. Vol. 4. Sharks of the world. An annotated and illustrated catalogue of sharks species known to date. Part 1. Hexanchiformes to Lamniformes. FAO Fish Synop., (125)Vol.4, Pt.1: 249 p. - A copy is available online at Fao.org
- Leonard Compagno, 1984b. FAO species catalogue. Vol. 4. Sharks of the world. An annotated and illustrated catalogue of shark species known to date. Part 2. Carcharhiniformes. FAO Fish.Synop., (125) Vol.4, Pt.2: 251-655 - A copy is available online at Fao.org
- Leonard Compagno, 1988. Sharks of the Order Carcharhiniformes. Princeton University Press, Princeton, New Jersey, 486 pp + 21 Figures, + 35 Plates. ISBN 0-691-08453-X
- Leonard Compagno, 1999. Checklist of living elasmobranches, p. 471-498. In: W.C. Hamlett, ed. Sharks, skates and rays: the biology of elasmobranchs fishes, Johns Hopkins University Press. Maryland, 515 pp. - A partial copy is available online at Google.books.it
- Leonard Compagno, 2001. Sharks of the world. An annotated and illustrated catalogue of shark species known to date. Vol. 2. Bullhead, mackerel, and carpet sharks (Heterodontiformes, Lamniformes and Orectolobiformes). FAO Species Catalogue for Fishery Purposes. No 1, Vol. 2. Roma, FAO. 269 pp. - A copy is available online at Fao.org
- Leonard Compagno, Dando M., Fowler S., 2005. A Field Guide to the Sharks of the World. HarperCollins Publishers Ltd., London. 368 pp., 64 colour plates. Princeton Field Guide: ISBN 978-0-691-12072-0. Collins Field Guide: ISBN 978-0-00-713610-0.

== Taxon described by him ==
- See Category:Taxa named by Leonard Compagno
