= List of cartilaginous fish of Sri Lanka =

Sri Lanka is a tropical island situated close to the southern tip of India. The diversity of fish fauna within the inland waterways and around the island is very high considering the small size of the island.

== Class Chondrichthyes - Cartilage fishes ==
Among the marine fishes, sharks and batoids (rays and skates) form a considerable diversity. A preliminary checklist of sharks around Sri Lanka was compiled by marine biologist, ornithologist, astronomer and well known diver Rex I. De Silva in 1985. It is cited as the first most comprehensive catalogue to Sri Lankan cartilage fishes. On 2016 May, he published the Illustrated Guide of Sharks of Sri Lanka. According to De Silva, there are 60 sharks species and 30 rays and skates found around the coast of Sri Lanka.

Sharks are a group of fish characterized by a cartilaginous skeleton, five to seven gill slits on the sides of the head, and pectoral fins that are not fused to the head. Modern sharks are classified within the clade Selachimorpha (or Selachii) and are the sister group to the rays.

The following list of shark species recorded from the territorial waters of Sri Lanka.

=== Order Hexanchiformes - primitive sharks ===
==== Family Hexanchidae - cow sharks ====
Name	Binomial	Note
Bluntnose sixgill shark	Hexanchus griseus	
Broadnose sevengill shark	Notorynchus cepedianus	unconfirmed

=== Order Squaliformes ===
==== Family Centrophoridae - gulper sharks ====
Name	Binomial
Leaf scale gulper shark	Centrophorus squamosus
Gulper shark	Centrophorus granulatus

==== Family Dalatiidae - kitefin sharks ====
Name	Binomial
Ornate dogfish	Centroscyllium ornatum
Kitefin shark	Dalatias licha

==== Family Echinorhinidae - bramble sharks ====
Name	Binomial
Bramble shark	Echinorhinus brucus
Prickly shark	Echinorhinus cookei

==== Family Somniosidae - sleeper sharks ====
Name	Binomial
Roughskin dogfish	Centroscymnus owstonii

=== Order Orectolobiformes - carpet sharks ===
==== Family Hemiscylliidae - bamboo sharks ====
Name	Binomial
Grey bamboo shark	Chiloscyllium griseum
Slender bamboo shark	Chiloscyllium indicum
White spotted bamboo shark	Chiloscyllium plagiosum

==== Family Stegostomatidae ====
Name	Binomial
Zebra shark	Stegostoma fasciatum

==== Family Ginglymostomatidae - nurse sharks ====
Name	Binomial
Tawny nurse shark	Nebrius ferrugineus

==== Family Rhincodontidae ====
Name	Binomial
Whale shark	Rhincodon typus

=== Order Lamniformes - mackerel sharks ===
==== Family Alopiidae - thresher sharks ====
Name	Binomial
Thresher shark	Alopias vulpinus
Bigeye thresher shark	Alopias superciliosus
Pelagic thresher shark	Alopias pelagicus

==== Family Odontaspididae - sand sharks ====
Name	Binomial
Bigeye sand tiger	Odontaspis noronhai
Smalltooth sand tiger	Odontaspis ferox
Sand tiger shark	Carcharias taurus

==== Family Pseudocarchariidae ====
Name	Binomial
Crocodile shark	Pseudocarcharias kamoharai

==== Family Lamnidae - white sharks ====
Name	Binomial
Great white shark	Carcharodon carcharias
Shortfin mako shark	Isurus oxyrinchus
Longfin mako shark	Isurus paucus

==== Family Megachasmidae - megamouth ====
Name	Binomial
Megamouth shark	Megachasma pelacios

=== Order Carcharhiniformes - ground sharks ===
==== Family Scyliorhinidae - catsharks ====
Name	Binomial
Coral catshark	Atelomycterus marmoratus
Bristly catshark	Bythaelurus hispidus
Dwarf false catshark	Planonasus parini

==== Family Proscylliidae - finback catsharks ====
Name	Binomial
Pygmy ribbontail catshark	Eridacnis radcliffei

==== Family Triakidae - houndsharks ====
Name	Binomial
Starspotted smooth-hound	Mustelus manazo
Arabian smooth-hound	Mustelus mosis

==== Family Hemigaleidae - weasel sharks ====
Name	Binomial
Hooktooth shark	Chaenogaleus macrostoma
Sicklefin weasel shark	Hemigaleus microstoma
Snaggletooth shark	Hemipristis elongatus

==== Family Carcharhinidae - requiem sharks ====
Name	Binomial
Silvertip shark	Carcharhinus albimarginatus
Bignose shark	Carcharhinus altimus
Graceful shark	Carcharhinus amblyrhynchoides
Grey reef shark	Carcharhinus amblyrhynchos
Pigeye shark	Carcharhinus amboinensis
Spinner shark	Carcharhinus brevipinna
Whitecheek shark	Carcharhinus dussumieri
Silky shark	Carcharhinus falciformis
Pondicherry shark	Carcharhinus hemiodon
Blacktip shark	Carcharhinus limbatus
Oceanic whitetip shark	Carcharhinus longimanus
Hardnose shark	Carcharhinus macloti
Blacktip reef shark	Carcharhinus melanopterus
Sandbar shark	Carcharhinus plumbeus
Blackspot shark	Carcharhinus sealei
Spot-tail shark	Carcharhinus sorrah
Tiger shark	Galeocerdo cuvier
Broadfin shark	Lamiopsis temminckii
Sliteye shark	Loxodon macrorhinus
Sicklefin lemon shark	Negaprion acutidens
Lemon shark	Negaprion brevirostris
Blue shark	Prionace glauca
Milk shark	Rhizoprionodon acutus
Grey sharpnose shark	Rhizoprionodon oligolinx
Spadenose shark	Scoliodon laticaudus
Whitetip reef shark	Triaenodon obesus

==== Family Sphyrnidae - hammerhead sharks ====
Name	Binomial
Winghead shark	Eusphyra blochii
Scalloped hammerhead	Sphyrna lewini
Great hammerhead	Sphyrna mokarran
Smooth hammerhead	Sphyrna zygaena

Batoidea is a superorder of cartilaginous fish commonly known as batoids or rays, but it also includes the skates and sawfishes. Approximately 560 species are described in thirteen families. Batoids are in the fish subclass Elasmobranchii along with sharks, as they are closely related. Rays are distinguished by their flattened bodies, enlarged pectoral fins that are fused to the head, and gill slits that are placed on their ventral surfaces.

The following list of rays and skates species recorded from the territorial waters of Sri Lanka.

=== Order Pristiformes ===
==== Family Pristidae - carpenter sharks ====
Name	Binomial
Narrow sawfish	Anoxypristis cuspidata
Largetooth sawfish	Pristis microdon
Longcomb sawfish	Pristis zijsron

=== Order Torpediniformes - electric rays ===
==== Family Narkidae - sleeper rays ====
Name	Binomial
Numbray	Narke dipterygia
Brown numbfish	Narcine brunnea
Blackspotted numbfish	Narcine timlei

=== Order Myliobatiformes - sting rays ===
==== Family Myliobatidae - eagle rays ====
Name	Binomial
Stripenose guitarfish	Acroteriobatus variegatus
Spotted eagle ray	Aetobatus narinari
Mottled eagle ray	Aetomylaeus maculatus
Banded eagle ray	Aetomylaeus nichofii
Wafic’s eagle ray	Aetomylaeus wafickii
Sharpnose guitarfish	Glaucostegus granulatus
Bowmouth guitarfish	Rhina ancylostoma
Annandale's guitarfish	Rhinobatos annandalei
Giant guitarfish	Rhynchobatus djiddensis
Rough cownose ray	Rhinoptera adspersa
Javanese cownose ray	Rhinoptera javanica

==== Family Dasyatidae - whiptail stingrays ====
Name	Binomial
Bluespotted maskray	Neotrygon kuhlii
Common stingray	Dasyatis pastinaca
Pale-edged stingray	Dasyatis zugei
Sharpnose stingray	Himantura gerrardi
Scaly whipray	Himantura imbricata
Blackedged stingray	Himantura marginata
Whiptail stingray	Himantura uarnacoides
Honeycomb stingray	Himantura uarnak
Pakistan whipray	Maculabatis arabica
Cowtail stingray	Pastinachus sephen
Bluespotted ribbon ray	Taeniura lymma
Round ribbontail ray	Taeniura meyeni
Porcupine ray	Urogymnus asperrimus

==== Family Gymnuridae - butterfly rays ====
Name	Binomial
Longtail butterfly ray	Gymnura poecilura

==== Subfamily Mobulidae - devil rays ====
Name	Binomial
Lesser devil ray	Mobula eregoodootenkee
Pygmy devil ray	Mobula kuhlii
