= List of sharks in the Red Sea =

There are 44 species of shark found in the Red Sea. This list is not exhaustive.

== Bathydemersal species ==
Scientific name	Image
Heptranchias perlo, Sharpnose sevengill shark, (Hexanchidae)	
Iago omanensis, Bigeye houndshark, (Triakidae)	
Mustelus manazo, Starspotted smooth-hound, (Triakidae)	

== Benthopelagic species ==
Scientific name	Image
Rhizoprionodon acutus, Milk shark, (Carcharhinidae)	

== Demersal species ==
Scientific name	Image
Loxodon macrorhinus, Sliteye shark, (Carcharhinidae)	
Hemipristis elongata, Snaggletooth shark, (Hemigaleidae)	
Mustelus mosis, Arabian smooth-hound, (Triakidae)	

== Pelagic species ==
Scientific name	Image
Alopias vulpinus, Common thresher, (Alopiidae)	
Chaenogaleus macrostoma, Hooktooth shark, (Hemigaleidae)	
Rhincodon typus, Whale shark, (Rhincodontidae)	

== Reef-associated species ==
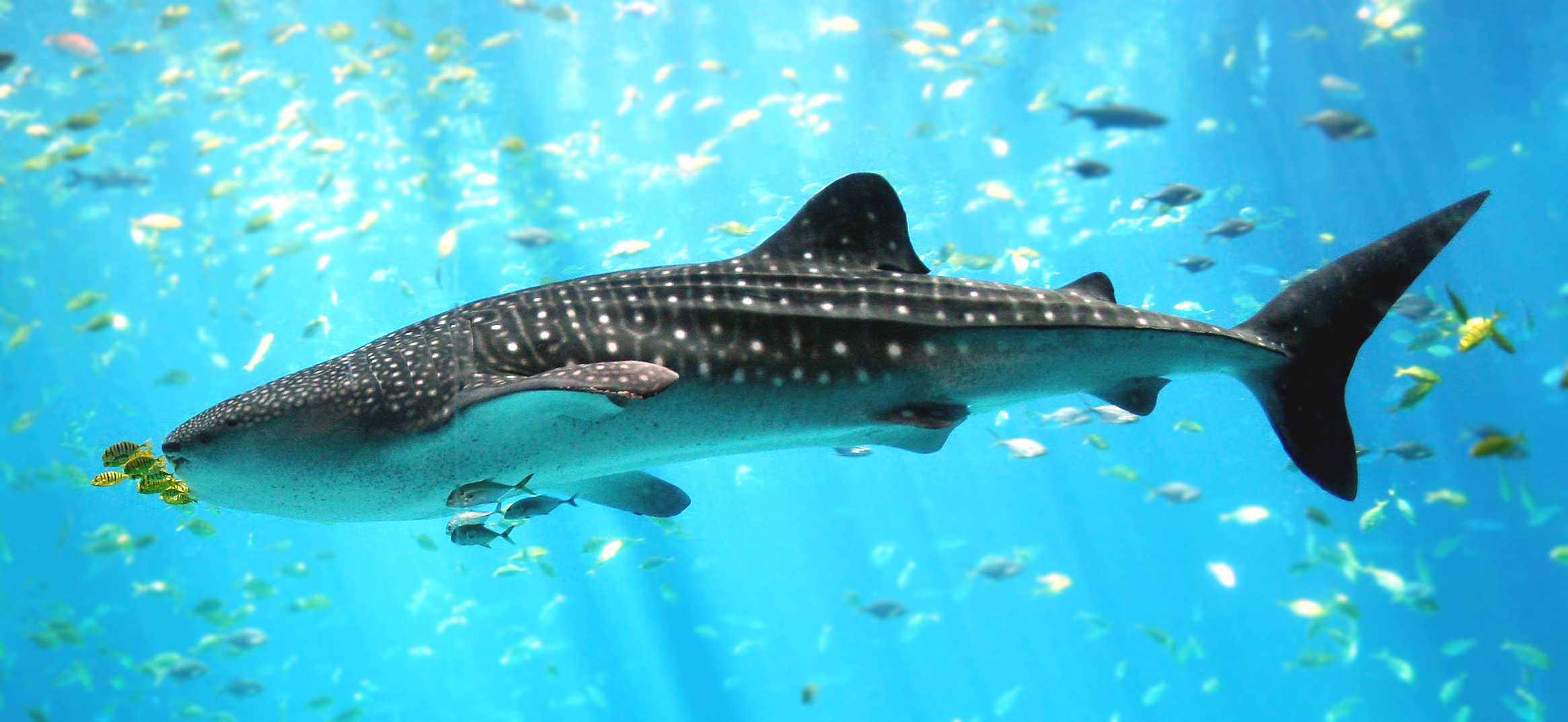
Rhincodon typus

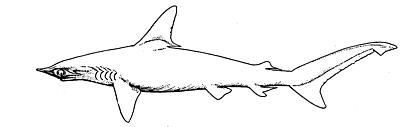
Sphyrna zygaena

Scientific name	Image
Alopias pelagicus, Pelagic thresher, (Alopiidae)	
Carcharhinus albimarginatus, Silvertip shark, (Carcharhinidae)	
Carcharhinus altimus, Bignose shark, (Carcharhinidae)	
Carcharhinus amblyrhynchos, Grey reef shark, (Carcharhinidae)	
Carcharhinus brevipinna, Spinner shark, (Carcharhinidae)	
Carcharhinus falciformis, Silky shark, (Carcharhinidae)	
Carcharhinus leucas, Bull shark, (Carcharhinidae)	
Carcharhinus limbatus, Blacktip shark, (Carcharhinidae)	
Carcharhinus longimanus, Oceanic whitetip shark, (Carcharhinidae)	
Carcharhinus melanopterus, Blacktip reef shark, (Carcharhinidae)	
!Carcharhinus obscurus, Dusky shark, (Carcharhinidae)	
Carcharhinus plumbeus, Sandbar shark, (Carcharhinidae)	
Carcharhinus sorrah, Spottail shark, (Carcharhinidae)	
Galeocerdo cuvier, Tiger shark, (Carcharhinidae)	
Negaprion acutidens, Sicklefin lemon shark, (Carcharhinidae)	
Triaenodon obesus, Whitetip reef shark, (Carcharhinidae)	
Nebrius ferrugineus, Tawny nurse shark, (Ginglymostomatidae)	
Isurus oxyrinchus, Shortfin mako, (Lamnidae)	
Carcharias taurus, Sand tiger shark, (Odontaspididae)	
Sphyrna lewini, Scalloped hammerhead, (Sphyrnidae)	
Sphyrna mokarran, Great hammerhead, (Sphyrnidae)	
Sphyrna zygaena. Smooth hammerhead, (Sphyrnidae)	
Stegostoma fasciatum, Zebra shark, (Stegostomatidae)	

== See also ==
- Red Sea species hazardous to humans
- List of fishes of the Red Sea
- List of sharks
