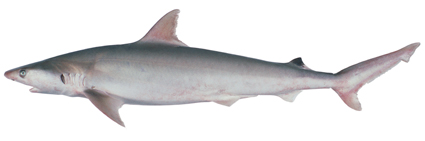

Conservation status
- Least Concern (IUCN 3.1)

Scientific classification
- Kingdom: Animalia
- Phylum: Chordata
- Class: Chondrichthyes
- Subclass: Elasmobranchii
- Division: Selachii
- Order: Carcharhiniformes
- Family: Carcharhinidae
- Genus: Carcharhinus
- Species: C. coatesi

Binomial name
- Carcharhinus coatesi (Whitley, 1939)

Synonyms
- Platypodon coatesi

= Australian blackspot shark =

Species of shark

The Australian blackspot shark or Coates's shark (Carcharhinus coatesi) is a species of requiem shark found off northern Australia (from Shark Bay in Western Australia to K'gari in Queensland) and possibly also off the coast of New Guinea. It belongs to a species complex of blackspot sharks in the family Carcharhinidae. These sharks are not widely studied due to their cryptic nature, but there was a recent reclassification distinguishing it from the whitecheek shark (Carcharhinus dussumieri) and the blackspot shark (Carcharhinus sealei) in 2012. Much of the existing literature predates this reclassification and groups the Australian blackspot shark with the aforementioned closely related species.

== Description ==
The Australian blackspot shark is a small inshore shark. At birth, they range from 38–40 cm (15–16 in) in length. The mature size for both sexes is approximately 70 cm or 28 in. The maximum size recorded is 88 cm or 35 in. They have two dorsal fins, triangular pectoral fins, paired pelvic fins, an anal fin, and a heterocercal caudal fin. The second dorsal has a dark to black tip and all other fins are plain. This fin coloration is one of the main distinctions between the Australian blackspot and other species in the blackspot complex as other sharks will have dusky or black tips on more than just the second dorsal fin. The sharks overall are a pale brown that can fade to a gray after death. The ventral surfaces are almost white, which allows for camouflage with countershading. The upper teeth have oblique cusps with smooth-edged cusplets on one side. The lower teeth are narrow and upright with smooth-edged cusplets.

=== Reproduction ===
It is believed that these sharks reproduce every year. The gestation period is not known since there does not appear to be seasonal restrictions for their reproduction. Litter size averaged at 2 pups per litter and ranged from 1-3 pups. These sharks are viviparous, meaning they are live bearers that support their offspring with a yolk-sac placenta in the womb. There is no direct evidence to indicate the diet of these sharks, but it is most likely composed of small fish, cephalopods, and crustaceans. It is believed they live for 6.5-7 years.

=== Common Names ===
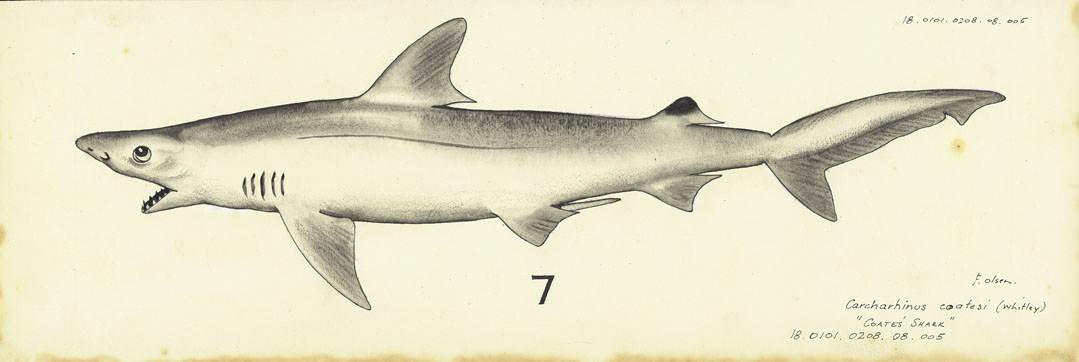
Australian blackspot shark

These sharks have been known as Coates's sharks and Australian blackspot shark. Since the IUCN recognizes the shark as the Australian blackspot shark, this is the more recognized common name. Much of the literature generalizes this species of shark with its close relatives in the blackspot complex.

== Geographic Range ==
The geographic range of these sharks is believed to be the inshore waters around northern Australia, spanning from Shark Bay in Western Australia to K'gari in Queensland. The sharks are also found in Papua New Guinea. The inshore waters they occupy include the continental shelf off the coast of Australia. They are known to occupy a depth range from the surface to a lower depth limit of 123 m (400 ft). An interactive distribution map is shown at the iucnredlist page. Geographic range is another distinguishing characteristic for the Australian blackspot shark; its close relative C. dussumieri is distributed more in the Indo-Pacific region, extending from the Arabian Sea to the Persian Gulf and including the coasts of Java, Indonesia, Japan, and Australia.

== Threats ==
The main threat this species faces is bycatch. The sharks caught by prawn trawl fisheries are sold for meat and fins. Bycatch reduction devices can limit the number of larger individuals affected, but they are not used in all fisheries and do not guarantee the sharks will not end up as bycatch. The IUCN considers this species to be of least concern as of July 23, 2018.
