= Archaeogaleus =

Archaeogaleus Temporal range: Valanginian

Scientific classification
- Domain: Eukaryota
- Kingdom: Animalia
- Phylum: Chordata
- Class: Chondrichthyes
- Subclass: Elasmobranchii
- Division: Selachii
- Order: Carcharhiniformes
- Family: Carcharhinidae
- Genus: †Archaeogaleus
- Species: †A. lengadocensis

Binomial name
- †Archaeogaleus lengadocensis Guinot, Cappetta, & Adnet, 2014

Extinct genus of sharks

Archaeogaleus is an extinct genus of requiem shark from the Cretaceous period. It is known only from the species A. lengadocensis. It was described from the Valanginian stage of France. The specific epithet refers to Lengadòc, the region where Occitan was historically spoken. It is the oldest known requiem shark and has a presumed dentition similar to the modern form Scoliodon.
