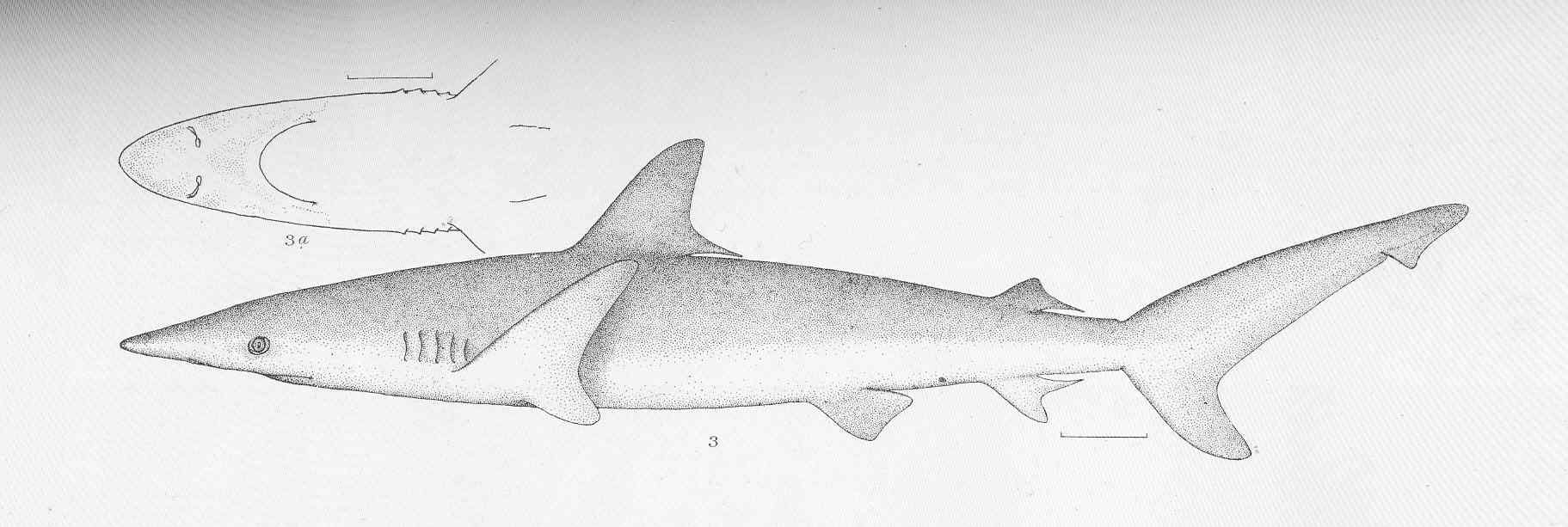

Conservation status
- Endangered (IUCN 3.1)

Scientific classification
- Kingdom: Animalia
- Phylum: Chordata
- Class: Chondrichthyes
- Subclass: Elasmobranchii
- Division: Selachii
- Order: Carcharhiniformes
- Family: Carcharhinidae
- Genus: Nasolamia; Compagno & Garrick, 1983
- Species: N. velox

Binomial name
- Nasolamia velox (C. H. Gilbert, 1898)
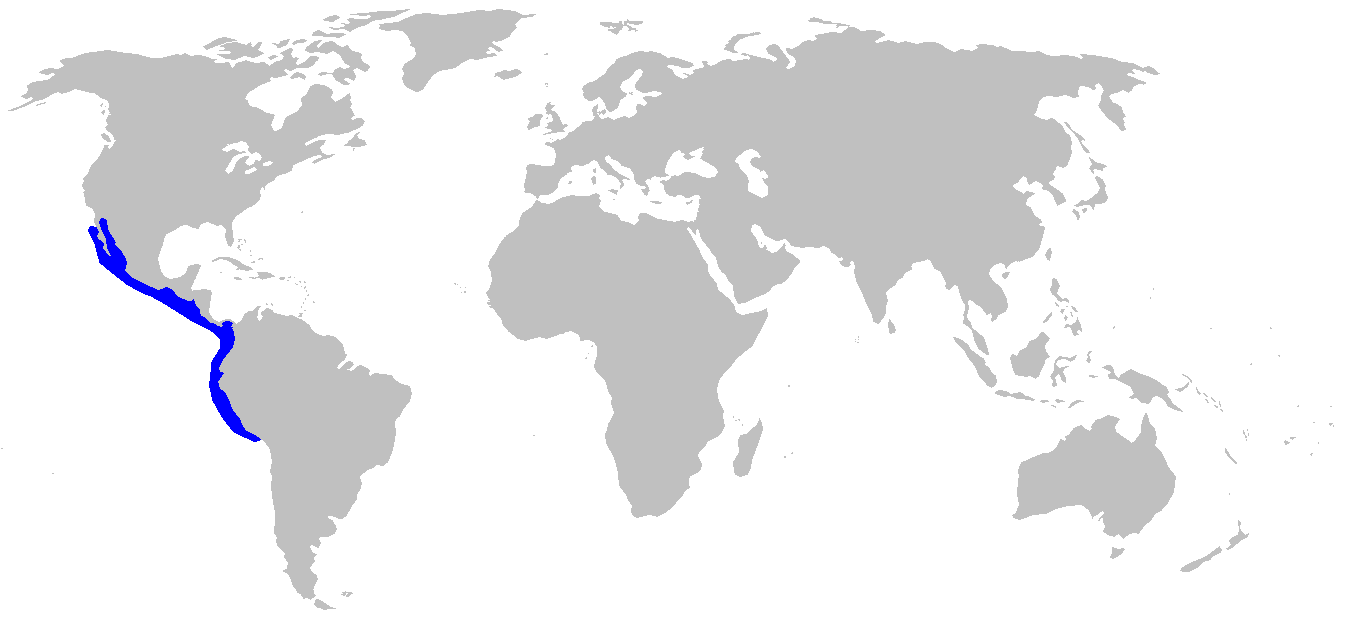

Synonyms
- Carcharhinus velox Gilbert, 1898

= Whitenose shark =

Species of shark

The whitenose shark (Nasolamia velox) is a species of shark of the family Carcharhinidae. The only member of the genus Nasolamia, it is found in the tropical waters of the eastern Pacific Ocean between latitudes 31° N and 18° S, between depths of 15 to 200 m. It can grow up to a length of 1.5 m. The whitenose shark is viviparous, with five young in a litter, and a birth size around 53 cm.

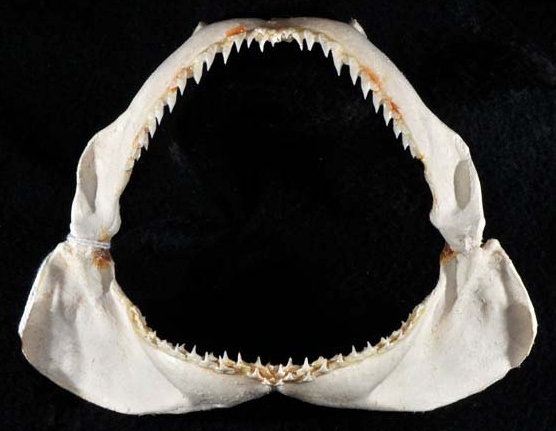
Jaws

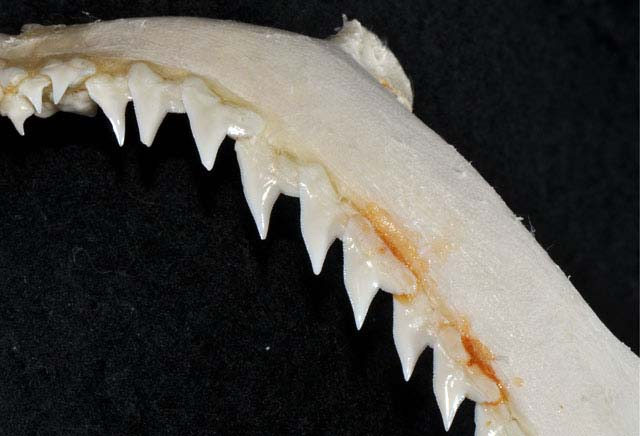
Upper teeth

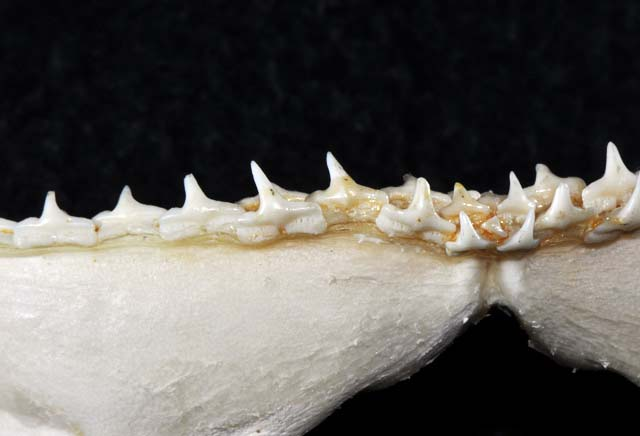
Lower teeth
