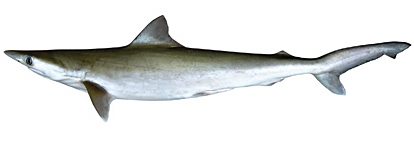

Conservation status
- Near Threatened (IUCN 3.1)

Scientific classification
- Kingdom: Animalia
- Phylum: Chordata
- Class: Chondrichthyes
- Subclass: Elasmobranchii
- Division: Selachii
- Order: Carcharhiniformes
- Family: Carcharhinidae
- Genus: Rhizoprionodon
- Species: R. oligolinx

Binomial name
- Rhizoprionodon oligolinx V. G. Springer, 1964
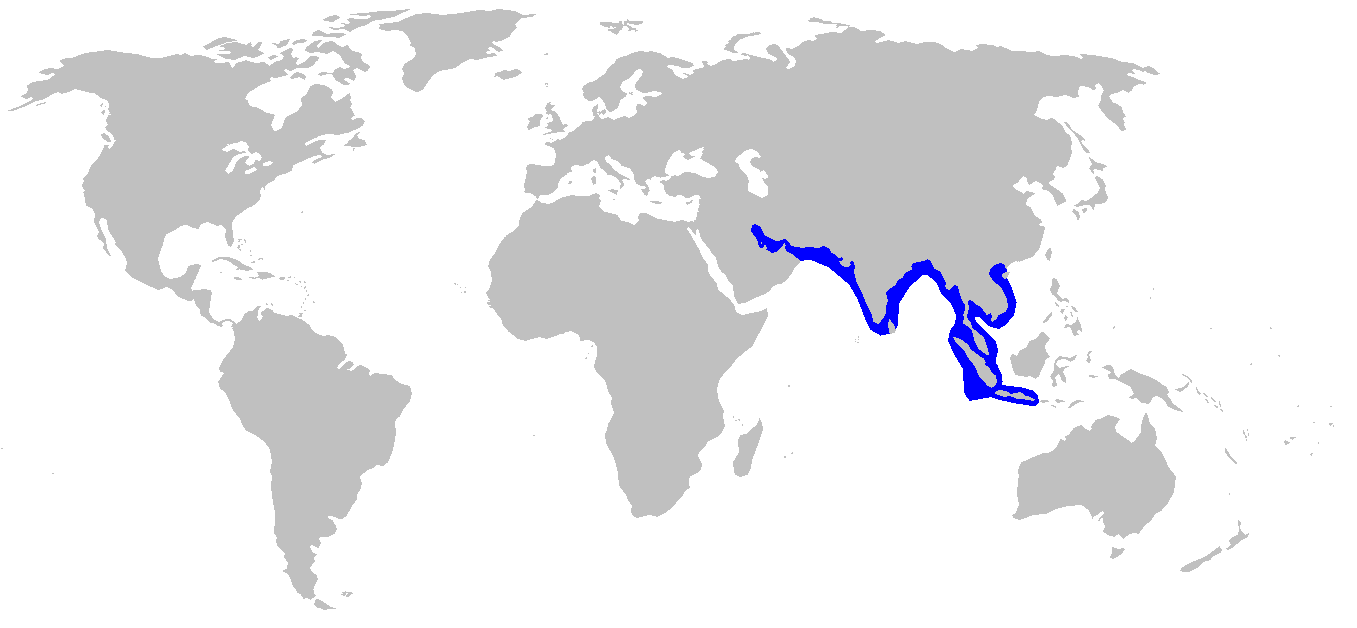

= Grey sharpnose shark =

Species of shark

The grey sharpnose shark (Rhizoprionodon oligolinx) is a requiem shark of the family Carcharhinidae. It is found in the tropical waters of the Indo-West Pacific Oceans, between latitudes 30° N and 18° S, from the surface to a depth of 36 m. It can reach a length of about 70 cm.

It is fished in the Gazetteer Indo-West Pacific and the waters from the Persian Gulf east to Thailand, Indonesia, China, and Japan. It has also been found in the Gulf of Carpentaria and Palau. In appearance and size, this species is very close to Rhizoprionodon taylori.

The diet of the grey sharpnose shark consists of crustaceans, fishes, and cephalopods.

It is commonly caught by inshore demersal gillnet fisheries, especially off Java for fish meal and its fins. It is also killed for human consumption, fresh or dried salted.

It is considered to be harmless to people.
