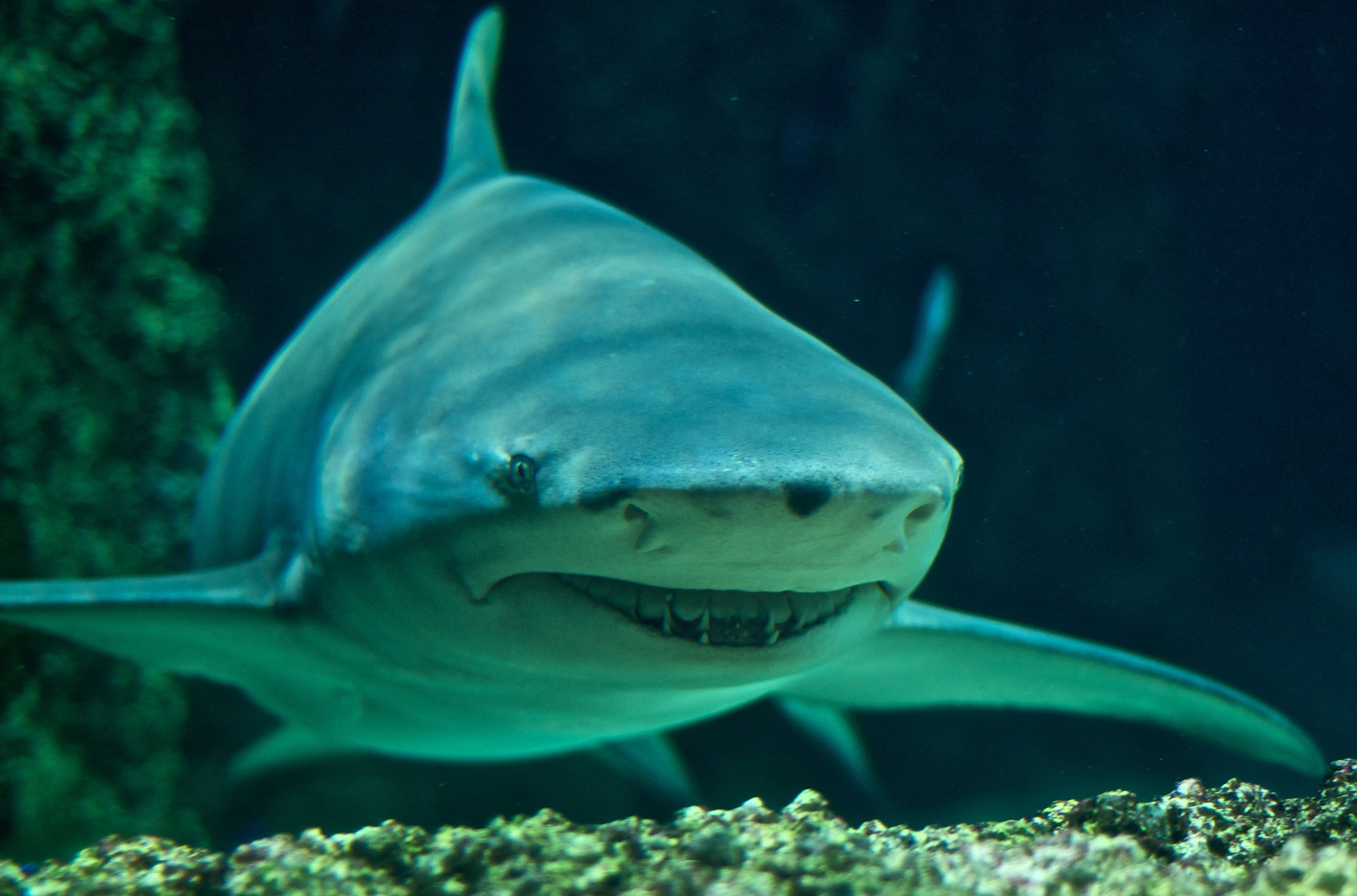

Conservation status
- Endangered (IUCN 3.1)
- CITES Appendix II

Scientific classification
- Kingdom: Animalia
- Phylum: Chordata
- Class: Chondrichthyes
- Subclass: Elasmobranchii
- Division: Selachii
- Order: Carcharhiniformes
- Family: Carcharhinidae
- Genus: Negaprion
- Species: N. acutidens

Binomial name
- Negaprion acutidens (Rüppell, 1837)
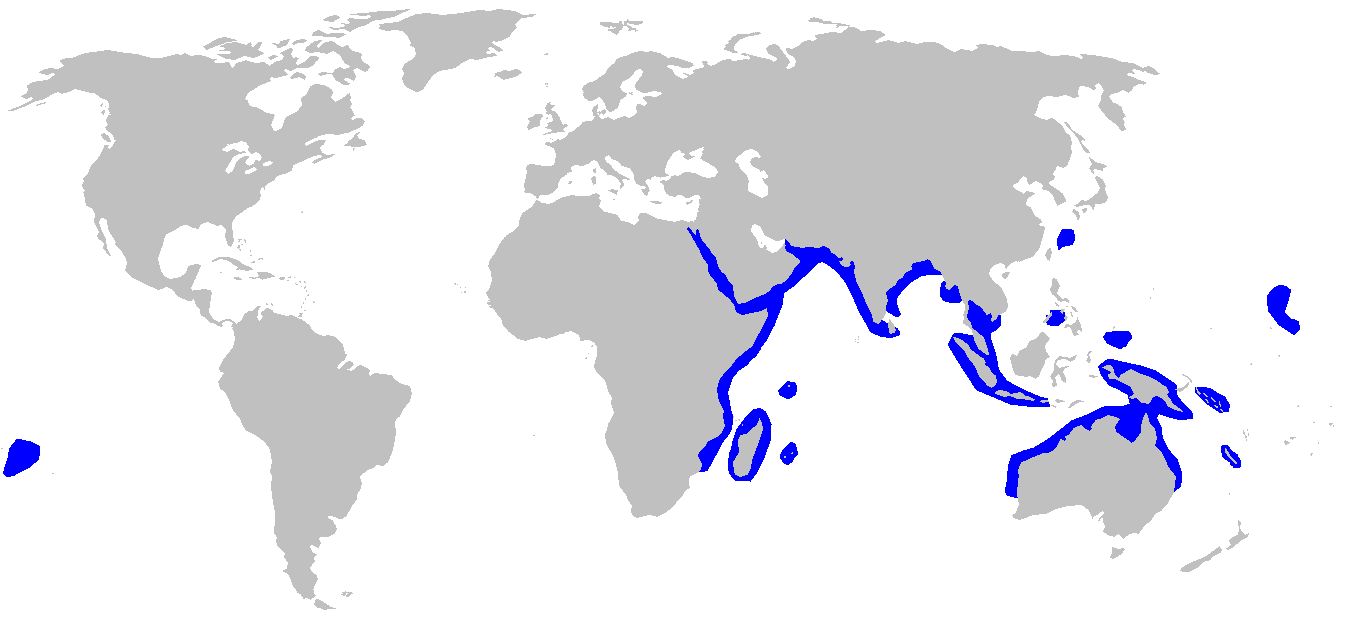
- Range of the sicklefin lemon shark

Synonyms
- Aprionodon acutidens queenslandicus Whitley, 1939; Carcharias acutidens Rüppell, 1837; Carcharias forskalii* Klunzinger, 1871; Carcharias munzingeri Kossmann & Räuber, 1877; Eulamia odontaspis Fowler, 1908; Hemigaleops fosteri Schultz & Welander, 1953; Mystidens innominatus Whitley, 1944; Negaprion queenslandicus Whitley, 1939; Odontaspis madagascariensis Fourmanoir, 1961 * ambiguous synonym

= Sicklefin lemon shark =

Species of shark

The sicklefin lemon shark (Negaprion acutidens) or sharptooth lemon shark is a species of requiem shark belonging to the family Carcharhinidae, widely distributed in the tropical waters of the Indo-Pacific. It is closely related to the better-known lemon shark (N. brevirostris) of the Americas; the two species are almost identical in appearance, both being stout-bodied sharks with broad heads, two dorsal fins of nearly equal size, and a plain yellow-tinged coloration. As its common name suggests, the sicklefin lemon shark differs from its American counterpart in having more falcate (sickle-shaped) fins. This large species grows up to 3.8 m (12 ft) long. It generally inhabits water less than 92 m (302 ft) deep in a variety of habitats, from mangrove estuaries to coral reefs.

A slow-moving predator feeding mainly on bony fishes, the sicklefin lemon shark seldom travels long distances and many individuals can be found year-round at certain locations. Like other members of its family, this species is viviparous, with females giving birth to no more than 13 pups every other year, following a gestation period of 10–11 months. Although they are potentially dangerous to humans and known to respond vigorously to any provocation, under normal circumstances, sicklefin lemon sharks are cautious and tend to retreat if approached. The IUCN has assessed this species as Endangered; its low reproductive productivity and rate of movement limits the capacity of depleted stocks to recover. Off India and Southeast Asia, this species has been severely depleted or extirpated by unregulated exploitation for its meat, fins, and liver oil.

== Taxonomy and phylogeny ==
The sicklefin lemon shark was first described as Carcharias acutidens by German naturalist Eduard Rüppell, in the 1837 Fische des Rothen Meeres (Fishes of the Red Sea). In 1940, Australian ichthyologist Gilbert Percy Whitley moved this species to his newly formed genus Negaprion. The type specimen, designated in 1960, is a 68-cm-long individual caught in the Red Sea off Jeddah, Saudi Arabia. The specific epithet acutidens is derived from the Latin acutus meaning "sharp", and dens meaning "teeth". The sicklefin lemon shark may also be referred to as broadfin shark, Indian lemon shark, Indo-Pacific lemon shark, or in its native range simply "lemon shark", where it does not overlap with its Atlantic relative.

Based on microsatellite DNA evidence, the sicklefin lemon shark is thought to have diverged from its sister species N. brevirostris 10–14 million years ago, when the closure of the Tethys Sea separated lemon sharks in the Indian Ocean from those in the Atlantic. The ancestral lemon shark species may have been N. eurybathrodon, the fossilized teeth of which occur in both the United States and Pakistan. Morphological and molecular phylogenetic analyses suggest that Negaprion is grouped with the whitetip reef shark (Triaenodon) and the sliteye shark (Loxodon) in occupying an intermediate position on the carcharhinid evolutionary tree, between the most basal genera (Galeocerdo, Rhizoprionodon, and Scoliodon) and the most derived (Carcharhinus and Sphyrna).

== Distribution and habitat ==
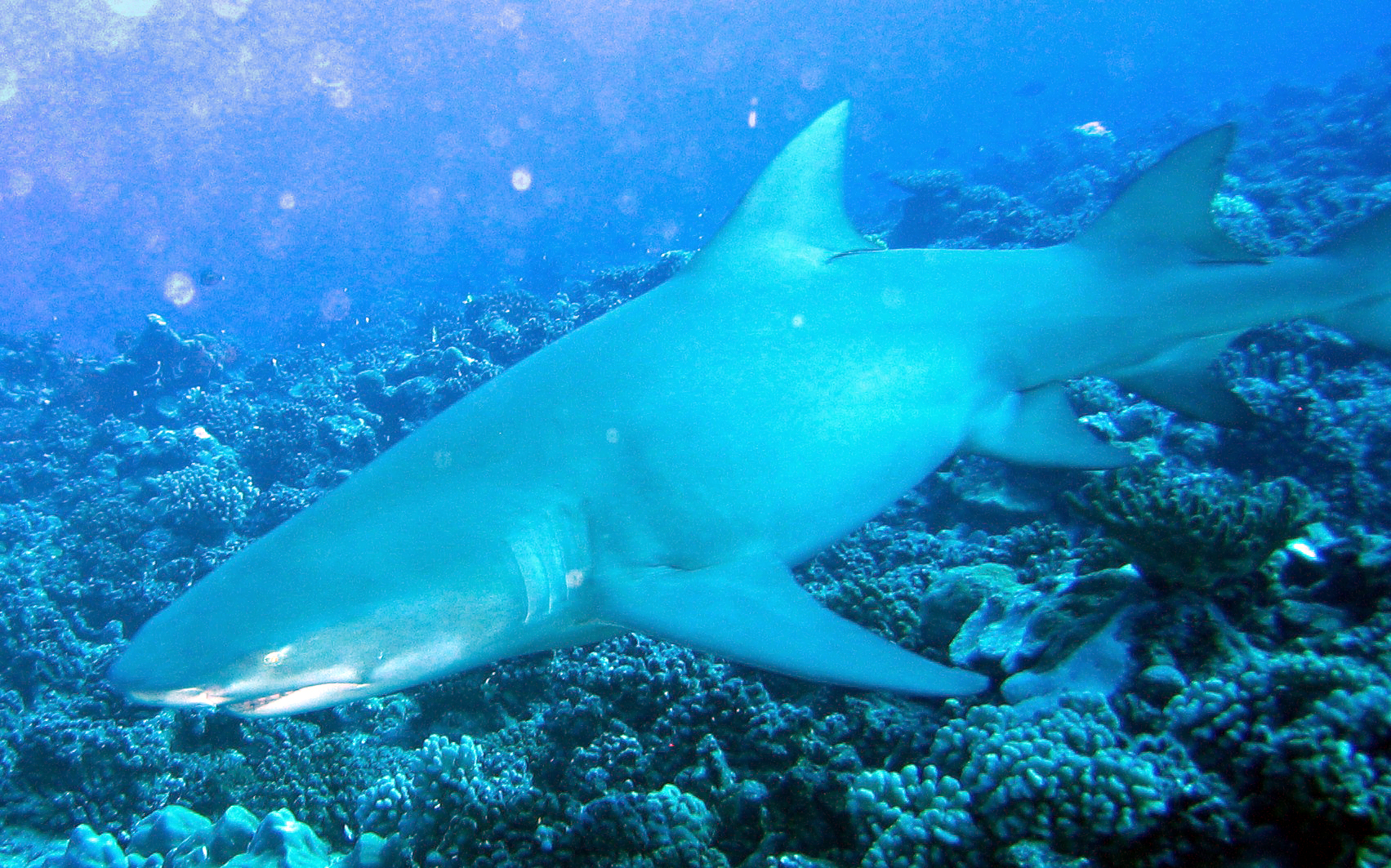
Coral reefs are one of the environments inhabited by the sicklefin lemon shark.

The range of the sicklefin lemon shark extends from South Africa to the Red Sea (including Mauritius, the Seychelles, and Madagascar), continuing eastward along the coast of the Indian subcontinent to Southeast Asia, extending as far north as Taiwan and the Philippines, and as far south as New Guinea and northern Australia. This species is also found around numerous Pacific islands, including New Caledonia, Palau, the Marshall Islands, the Solomon Islands, Fiji, Vanuatu, and French Polynesia. This species likely colonized the central Pacific by infrequently "hopping" from one island to the next. Significant levels of genetic differentiation between sicklefin lemon sharks in Australia and French Polynesia, 7,500 km (4,700 mi) apart, suggest that little intermingling occurs between regional subpopulations.

An inhabitant of coastal continental and insular shelves, the sicklefin lemon shark occurs from the intertidal zone to a depth of 92 m (302 ft). This species favors still, murky waters and is most common in bays, estuaries, and lagoons, and over sandy flats and outer reefs. Sometimes, an individual may venture into open water; one was filmed in the 1971 documentary Blue Water, White Death, in the vicinity of a sperm whale (Physeter macrocephalus) carcass. Juvenile sicklefin lemon sharks are often found on reef flats or around mangroves, in water so shallow that their dorsal fins are exposed. In Herald Bight off Western Australia, a known nursery, juvenile sicklefin lemon sharks frequent open areas and mangroves in water under 3 m (9.8 ft) deep, but not areas covered by the seagrass Posidonia australis.

== Description ==
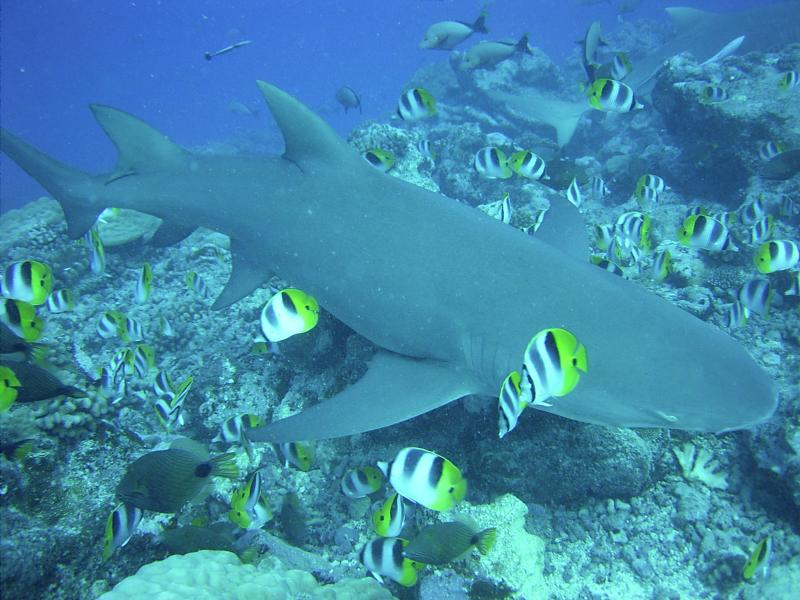
Sickle-shaped fins are a distinguishing characteristic of this species.

The sicklefin lemon shark has a robust, stocky body and a short, broad head. The snout is rounded or almost wedge-shaped, with small nostrils bearing triangular flaps of skin in front. The eyes are small, with no spiracles. Short furrows are present at the corners of the mouth. Thirteen to 16 (usually 14) tooth rows occur on either side of both jaws, not including the tiny teeth at the symphysis (the jaw midline). The upper teeth have a large cusp rising from a broad base, with a notch on each side; these teeth become increasingly angled towards the corners of the mouth. The lower teeth resemble the upper teeth, but are narrower and more erect. The teeth of sharks over 1.4 m (4.6 ft) long are finely serrated.

The fins (especially the dorsal, pectoral, and pelvics) of the sicklefin lemon shark are more falcate (sickle-shaped) than those of the otherwise very similar American lemon shark. The first dorsal fin is positioned closer to the pelvic than the pectoral fins. The second dorsal fin, nearly equal to the first in size, is located over or slightly forward of the anal fin. No ridge is seen between the dorsal fins. The pectoral fins are long and broad, originating below the space between the third and fourth gill slits. The anal fin has a strong notch in the rear margin. The precaudal pit (a cavity just forward of the caudal fin) is oriented longitudinally. The large dermal denticles are overlapping and bear three to five horizontal ridges each. The coloration is a plain yellowish brown or gray above and lighter below, with more yellow on the fins. This species attains a maximum known length of 3.8 m (12 ft), though it typically does not exceed 3.1 m (10 ft).

== Biology and ecology ==
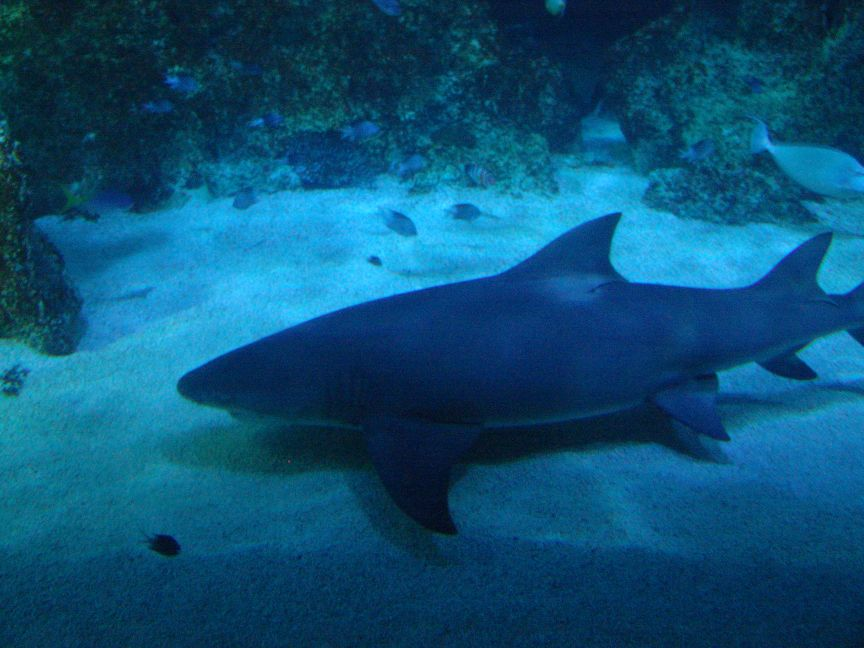
The sicklefin lemon shark usually swims close to the bottom.

Courtship behavior - a male (right) follows a female

A sluggish species, the sicklefin lemon shark is usually seen cruising sedately just above the sea bottom or lying still on it, as unlike most requiem sharks, it is capable of actively pumping water over its gills. However, it will approach the surface in pursuit of food. This shark seldom undertakes long-distance movements. A study at Aldabra Atoll in the Seychelles found, of the tagged sharks that were later recaptured, over 90% were still within 2 km (1.2 mi) of their initial tagging location. Another study at Moorea in French Polynesia found that some of the local sharks were year-round residents of the island, while others were more transitory and visited only occasionally.

Over 90% of the sicklefin lemon shark's diet consists of bottom- and shore-dwelling teleosts, including herring, mullets, mackerel, silversides, needlefish, smelt-whitings, porgies, sea catfish, triggerfish, parrotfish, and porcupinefish. Occasionally, they may also take cephalopods and crustaceans, and older individuals have been known to consume stingrays and guitarfish. This species may be preyed upon by larger sharks. Known parasites include the tapeworms Paraorygmatobothrium arnoldi, Pseudogrillotia spratti, Phoreiobothrium perilocrocodilus, and Platybothrium jondoeorum. Sicklefin lemon sharks have been documented resting on the bottom and eliciting cleanings by bluestreak cleaner wrasses (Labroides dimidiatus), during which they may open their mouths and stop respiring for as long as 150 seconds to give the wrasses access to their mouths and gills.

As with other members of its family, the sicklefin lemon shark is viviparous; the developing embryos are sustained by a placental connection formed from their depleted yolk sacs. Females give birth to one to 13 (usually six to 12) pups every other year in shallow nursery areas, following a gestation period of 10–11 months. Unlike in the American lemon shark, scant evidence indicates this species is philopatric (returns to the site of their birth to reproduce). Parturition occurs in October or November at Madagascar and Aldabra, and in January at French Polynesia; ovulation and mating for nonpregnant females takes place at around the same time. The embryos develop a placenta after around four months of gestation, when they still possess vestiges of external gills. The young are born at a length of 45–80 cm (18–31 in). Juvenile sharks grow slowly, at a rate of 12.5–15.5 cm (4.9–6.1 in) per year. Both sexes attain sexual maturity at a length of 2.2–2.4 m (7.2–7.9 ft).

== Human interactions ==
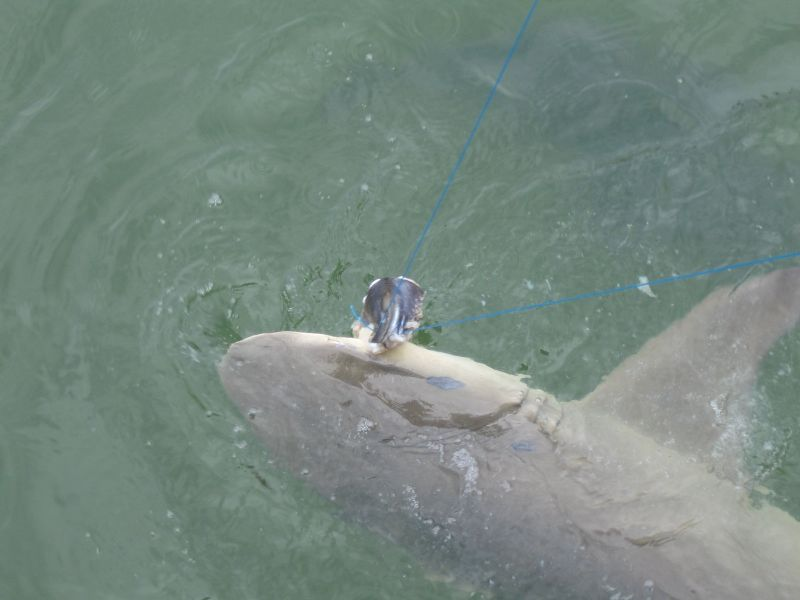
The sicklefin lemon shark is threatened by overfishing.

Several apparently unprovoked attacks on humans have been attributed to the sicklefin lemon shark. Due to its formidable size and teeth, it is regarded as potentially dangerous, and certainly this species has been known to defend itself quickly and vigorously if touched, speared, or otherwise provoked or alarmed. Once agitated, this shark can be a persistent adversary; in one case, a shark forced a swimmer to seek refuge atop a coral head, and circled for hours before giving up. However, observations by divers show that normally this shark is shy and hesitant to approach, even when presented with bait. Often, the shark will move away when a diver enters visual range. Young sharks are reportedly more aggressive and inquisitive than the adults. At Mo'orea, sicklefin lemon sharks are the main attraction of daily shark-feeding ecotourism dives. This shark adapts well to captivity and is displayed in public aquariums.

The IUCN has assessed the sicklefin lemon shark globally as Endangered; it is harvested using anchored and floating gillnets, beach nets, and longlines. The meat is sold fresh or dried and salted for human consumption, the fins used for shark fin soup, and the liver oil is processed for vitamins. The sicklefin lemon shark is highly susceptible to local overfishing, due to its slow reproductive rate and limited movements. Off Southeast Asia, this shark has become scarce under the pressure of expanding, unmonitored, and unregulated fisheries, and has been assessed there as Endangered by the IUCN. Widespread habitat degradation, including pollution and blast fishing on coral reefs and deforestation in mangroves, poses an additional threat to the survival of this species in the region. Already, the sicklefin lemon shark has been extirpated in parts of India and Thailand, and has not been reported from Indonesian markets in recent years despite being historically abundant there. Off Australia, the sicklefin lemon shark is taken in only small numbers intentionally and as bycatch, and has been listed under Least Concern.
