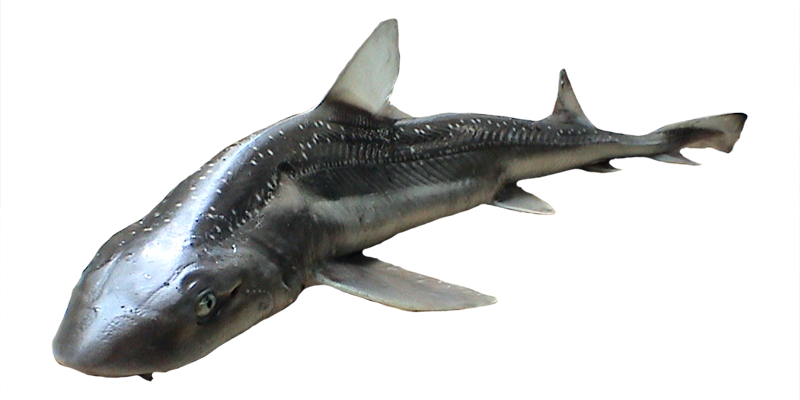

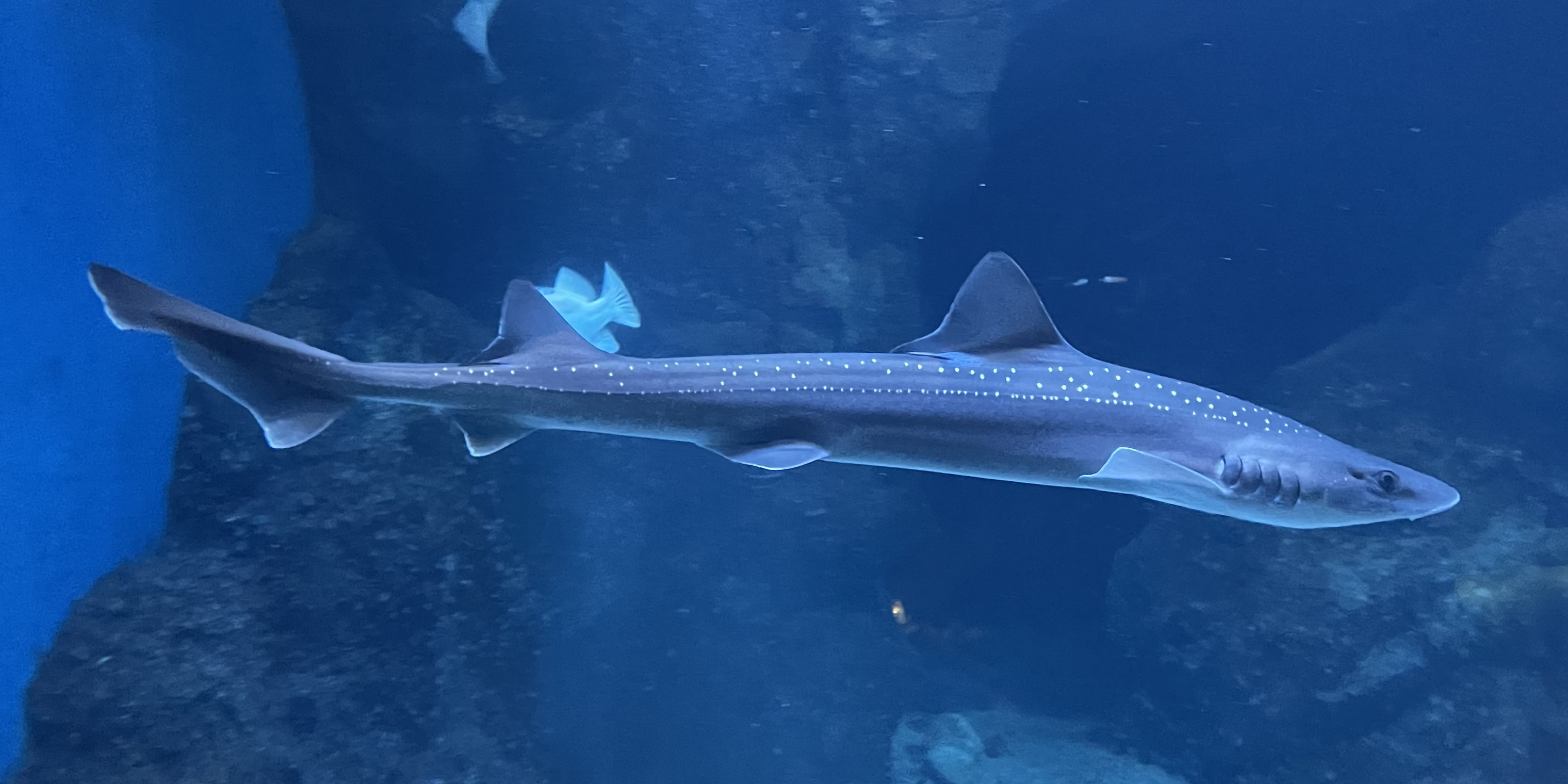

Conservation status
- Endangered (IUCN 3.1)

Scientific classification
- Kingdom: Animalia
- Phylum: Chordata
- Class: Chondrichthyes
- Subclass: Elasmobranchii
- Division: Selachii
- Order: Carcharhiniformes
- Family: Triakidae
- Genus: Mustelus
- Species: M. manazo

Binomial name
- Mustelus manazo Bleeker, 1854
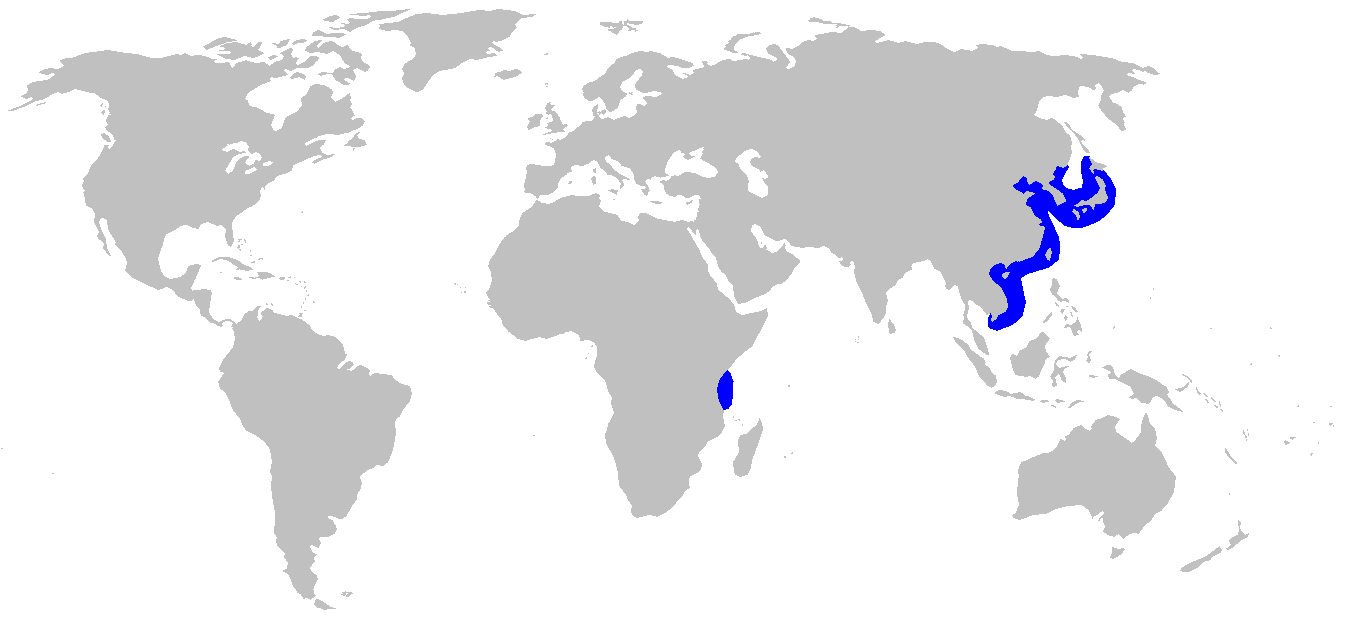

= Starspotted smooth-hound =

Species of shark

The starspotted smooth-hound (Mustelus manazo) is a houndshark of the family Triakidae. It is a medium-sized shark with irregular white spots across its body. It is found in Northwestern Pacific as well as Kenyan water. This shark mainly inhabits shallow seas and feeds on benthic animals. This shark is ovoviviparous and gives birth to 2-6 larvae per clutch. Currently, due to overfishing, this species is on the edge of extinction.

== Description ==
Compared with other sharks, the star-spotted smooth-hound has a medium size. Sexually mature individuals typically have lengths between 62-72 cm. Largest known male has a total length of 96 cm while the largest female has a length of 118 cm. Its body is elongated with a long tail and a flat head. Its dorsal side is gray or grayish brown, with irregular white spots scattered near their lateral lines, and its abdomen is white. Its eyes are oval with deep concavities outside. Its nostrils is wide with triangular nasal valves. The star-spotted smooth-hound has a triangular mouth with a large amount of small and interconnected teeth. Its teeth are oval or rhombus, overall blunt, unlike those possessed by other predatory sharks. Its first pair of dorsal fins are slightly larger than the second pair, starting at the end of the pectoral fins. The frontmost end of the anal fins is roughly at the midpoint of the second pair of dorsal fins.

== Distribution ==
The star-spotted smooth-hound is mainly found around the coastal waters of the northwest Pacific Ocean, ranging from southern Russia in the north to Brunei in the south, but some are also found in the coastal waters of Kenya in Africa. In addition, there are unconfirmed sightings of star-spotted smooth-hound recorded in the Andaman Sea and in the coastal waters of Madagascar and Bangladesh.

== Habitats ==
The star-spotted smooth-hound mainly inhabits continental shelves of temperate waters, especially waters with sandy or muddy substrates. They may occasionally enter estuaries to feed.

== Diet ==
The star-spotted smooth-hound mainly feeds on benthic organisms. Most of its prey are crustaceans such as mantis shrimps, crabs, and shrimps. They also occasionally prey on annelids, brittle stars, cephalopods, shellfish, and small fishes. Some studies have pointed out that the stomach content weight of star-spotted smooth-hound in Tokyo Bay waters has a downward trend, which may be due to the decline in the benthic invertebrate populations on which they feed on.

== Life cycle ==
The star-spotted smooth-hound is ovoviviparous and usually mates between May and August, giving birth to 2 to 6 young sharks in one litter, with a gestation period of about 10 months. Newly born sharks are about 30 cm long. Its age of star-spotted sexual maturity varies by location. For example, male sharks in waters around Taiwan can breed at the age of 1, while 6-year-old male sharks in the Aomori Bay may still be immature. Generally speaking, the female matures later than the male. Its length at sexual maturity also varies greatly depending on the sea area: star-spotted smooth-hound found near Taiwan is sexually mature around 30cm long, while individuals in Kanmon Strait and Maizuru Bay are generally mature at 60 to 70 cm in length. The star-spotted smooth-hound in Aomori Bay may still be immature until it is 90 cm long. The maximum lifespan of this shark is about 17 years.

== Economic use ==
The fins of star-spotted smooth-hound can be used to make shark fin soup, while the remaining part is also edible. There are few specialized fishing activities for this shark, it is generally obtained as bycatch. However, its meat and liver of star-spotted smooth-hounds are rich in mercury, which is harmful to human bodies, and the concentration of mercury is often higher than 1 ppm.

== Population conservation ==
Currently, the population status of star-spotted smooth-hound is in crisis. It is seriously affected by overfishing from China, Philippines, Vietnam, Malaysia, and Kenya, where these countries have large demands for seafood and have extremely large scales of fishing activities. Although some countries have policies such as restrictions on fishing activities at certain times of the year, there is no special conservation measurement for this species. In addition, frequent landfill activities in the Bohai Sea, Yellow Sea, East China Sea and other water have also seriously damaged the shallow sea habitats on which star-spotted smooth-hound relies on. The above factors have caused a serious decline in the population of star-spotted smooth-hound. The IUCN 2020 report estimated that the population of star-spotted smooth-hound has declined by 50% to 79% in the past 33 years, and it is therefore rated as Endangered.
