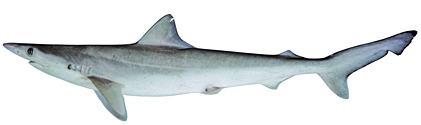

Conservation status
- Least Concern (IUCN 3.1)

Scientific classification
- Kingdom: Animalia
- Phylum: Chordata
- Class: Chondrichthyes
- Subclass: Elasmobranchii
- Division: Selachii
- Order: Carcharhiniformes
- Family: Carcharhinidae
- Genus: Rhizoprionodon
- Species: R. taylori

Binomial name
- Rhizoprionodon taylori (J. D. Ogilby, 1915)
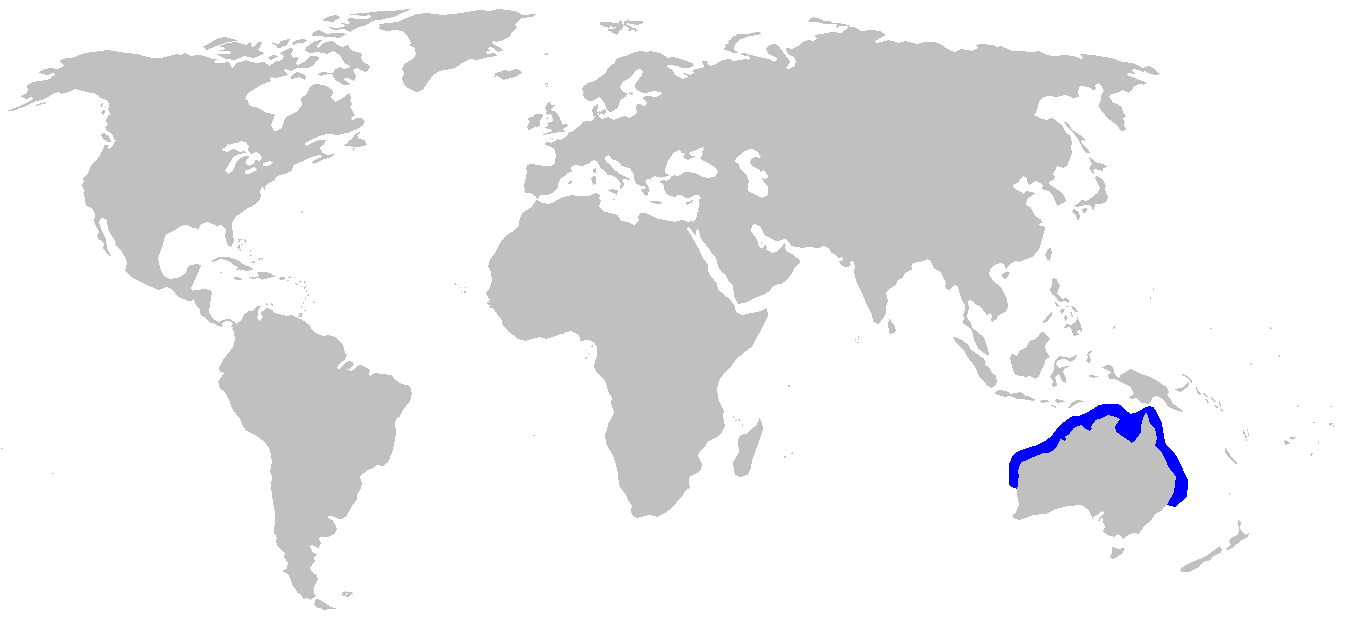

= Australian sharpnose shark =

Species of shark

The Australian sharpnose shark (Rhizoprionodon taylori) is a requiem shark, belonging to the family Carcharhinidae. It is found in the tropical waters of the western Pacific Ocean off Papua New Guinea and northern Australia, between latitudes 8°N and 28°S, from the surface to a depth of 110 m. It can grow up to a length around 70 cm. The Australian sharpnose shark is well known for its fast growth rate, which allows it to reach maturity at around one year of age. Australian sharpnose sharks may occasionally eat snakes.
