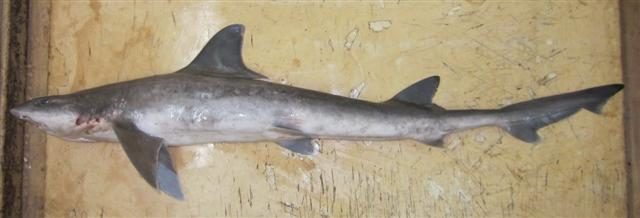

Conservation status
- Near Threatened (IUCN 3.1)

Scientific classification
- Kingdom: Animalia
- Phylum: Chordata
- Class: Chondrichthyes
- Subclass: Elasmobranchii
- Division: Selachii
- Order: Carcharhiniformes
- Family: Triakidae
- Genus: Mustelus
- Species: M. mosis

Binomial name
- Mustelus mosis Hemprich & Ehrenberg, 1899
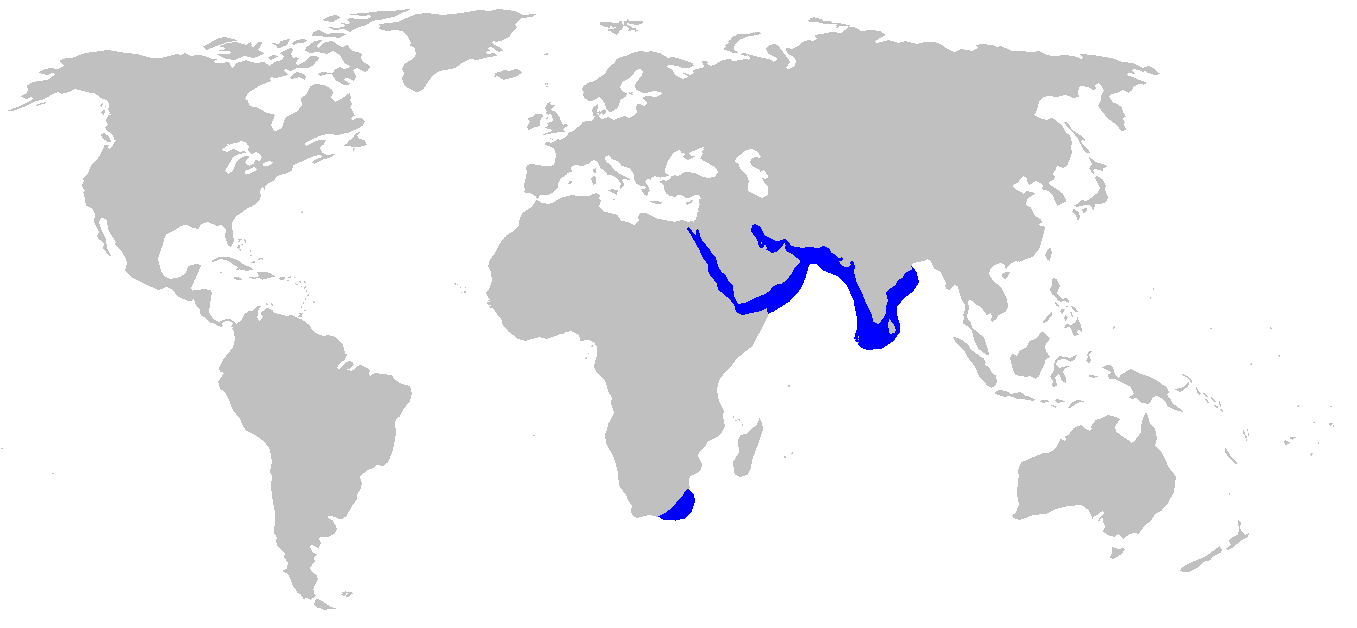

= Arabian smooth-hound =

Species of shark

The Arabian smooth-hound (Mustelus mosis) is a houndshark of the family Triakidae. It is found on the continental shelves of the tropical western Indian Ocean, from the Red Sea, the Persian Gulf, and East Africa to the Maldives, India, and Sri Lanka, between latitudes 30 and 7°N, at depths between 20 and 250 m (66 and 820 ft). It can reach a length of 1.5 m (4 ft 11 in).
