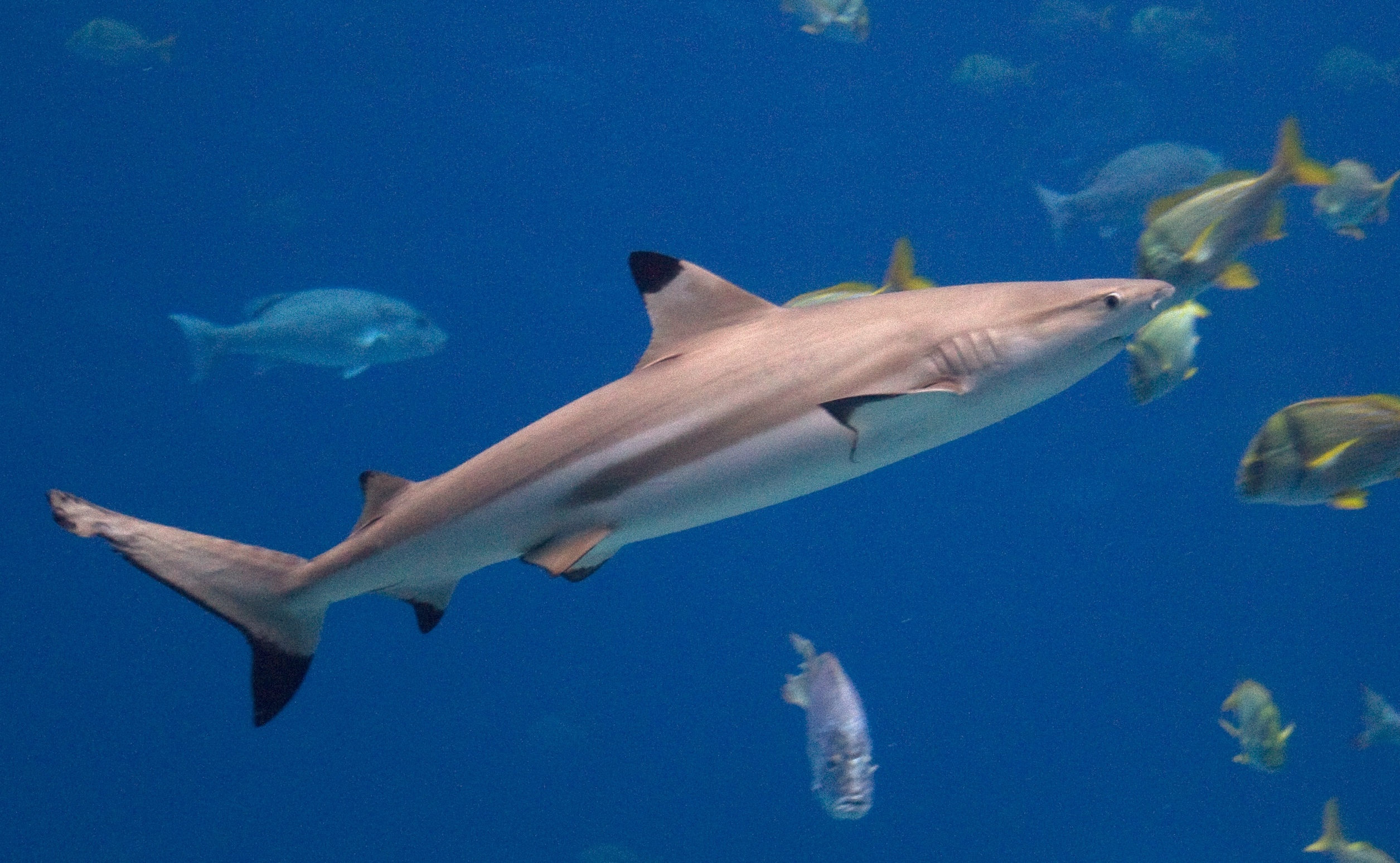
- Blacktip reef shark (Carcharhinus melanopterus)

Scientific classification
- Kingdom: Animalia
- Phylum: Chordata
- Class: Chondrichthyes
- Subclass: Elasmobranchii
- Division: Selachii
- Order: Carcharhiniformes
- Suborder: Carcharhinoidei
- Family: Carcharhinidae; D. S. Jordan & Evermann, 1896

= Requiem shark =

Requiem sharks Temporal range: Valanginian–Recent

Requiem sharks are members in the family Carcharhinidae. They are migratory, live-bearing sharks of warm seas (sometimes of Brackish water or fresh water) and include such species as the blacktip shark, bull shark, lemon shark, nervous shark, and whitetip reef shark.

Family members have the usual carcharhiniform characteristics. Their eyes are round, and one or two gill slits fall over the pectoral fin base. All species are viviparous, the young being born fully developed. They vary widely in size, from as small as 69 cm (2.26 ft) adult length in the Australian sharpnose shark, up to 4 m (13 ft) adult length in the oceanic whitetip shark. Scientists assume that the size and shape of their pectoral fins have the right dimensions to minimize transport cost. Requiem sharks tend to live in more tropical areas, but tend to migrate. Females release a chemical in the ocean in order to let the males know they are ready to mate. Typical mating time for these sharks is around spring to autumn.

According to the ISAF, requiem sharks are among the top five species involved in shark attacks on humans; however, "requiem shark" is not a single species, but refers, in this case, to an order of similar sharks that are often involved in incidents. ISAF prefers to use "requiem sharks" due to the difficulty in identifying individual species.

== Etymology ==
The common name requiem shark may be related to the French word for shark, requin, which is itself of disputed etymology. One derivation of the latter is from Latin requiem ("rest"), which would thereby create a cyclic etymology (requiem-requin-requiem), but other sources derive it from the Old French verb reschignier ("to grimace while baring teeth").

The scientific name Carcharhinidae was first proposed in 1896 by D.S. Jordan and B.W. Evermann as a subfamily of Galeidae (now replaced by "Carcharhinidae"). The term is derived from Greek κάρχαρος (karcharos, sharp or jagged), and ῥί̄νη (rhinē, rasp); both elements describe the jagged, rasp-like skin. Rasp-like skin is typical of shark skin in general, and is not diagnostic to Carcharhinidae.

== Evolutionary history ==
The oldest member of the family is Archaeogaleus lengadocensis from the Early Cretaceous (Valanginian) of France. Only a handful of records of the group are known from prior to the beginning of the Cenozoic. Modern carcharinid sharks have extensively diversified in coral reef habitats.

== Hunting strategies ==
Requiem sharks are extraordinarily fast and effective hunters. Their elongated, torpedo-shaped bodies make them quick and agile swimmers, so they can easily attack any prey. Some species are continually active, while others are capable of resting motionless for extended periods on the bottom. They have a range of food sources depending on location and species, including bony fish, squid, octopus, lobster, turtles, marine mammals, seabirds, other sharks and rays; smaller species tend to select a narrow range of prey, but some very large species, especially the tiger shark (Galeocerdo cuvier), are virtually omnivorous. They are often considered the "garbage cans" of the seas because they will eat almost anything, even non-food items like trash. They are migratory hunters that follow their food source across entire oceans. They tend to be most active at night time, where their impressive eyesight can help them sneak up on unsuspecting prey. It is worth mentioning that the tiger shark belongs to the Galeocerdonidae family. Most requiem sharks hunt alone, however some species like the whitetip reef sharks and lemon sharks are cooperative feeders and will hunt in packs through coordinated, timed attacks against their prey. Some of the species have been shown to give specialized displays when confronted by divers or other sharks, which may be indicative of aggressive or defensive threat.

== Classification ==
The 60 species of requiem shark are grouped into 10 genera:

- Genus Scoliodon J. P. Müller & Henle, 1838
  - Scoliodon laticaudus J. P. Müller & Henle, 1838 (spadenose shark)
  - Scoliodon macrorhynchos Bleeker, 1852 (Pacific spadenose shark)
- Genus Carcharhinus Blainville, 1816
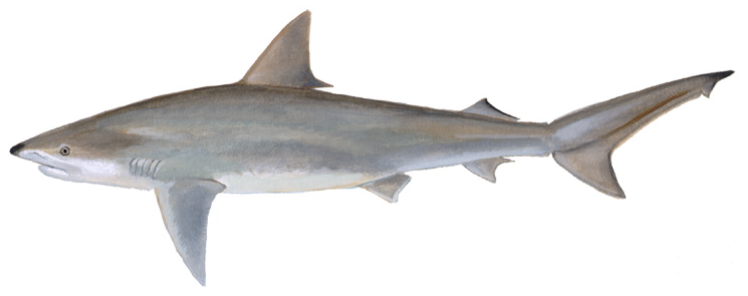
  - Carcharhinus acronotus Poey, 1860 (blacknose shark)
  - Carcharhinus albimarginatus Rüppell, 1837 (silvertip shark)
  - Carcharhinus altimus S. Springer, 1950 (bignose shark)
  - Carcharhinus amblyrhynchoides Whitley, 1934 (graceful shark)
  - Carcharhinus amblyrhynchos Bleeker, 1856 (grey reef shark)
  - Carcharhinus amboinensis J. P. Müller & Henle, 1839 (pigeye shark)
  - Carcharhinus borneensis Bleeker, 1858 (Borneo shark)
  - Carcharhinus brachyurus Günther, 1870 (copper shark)
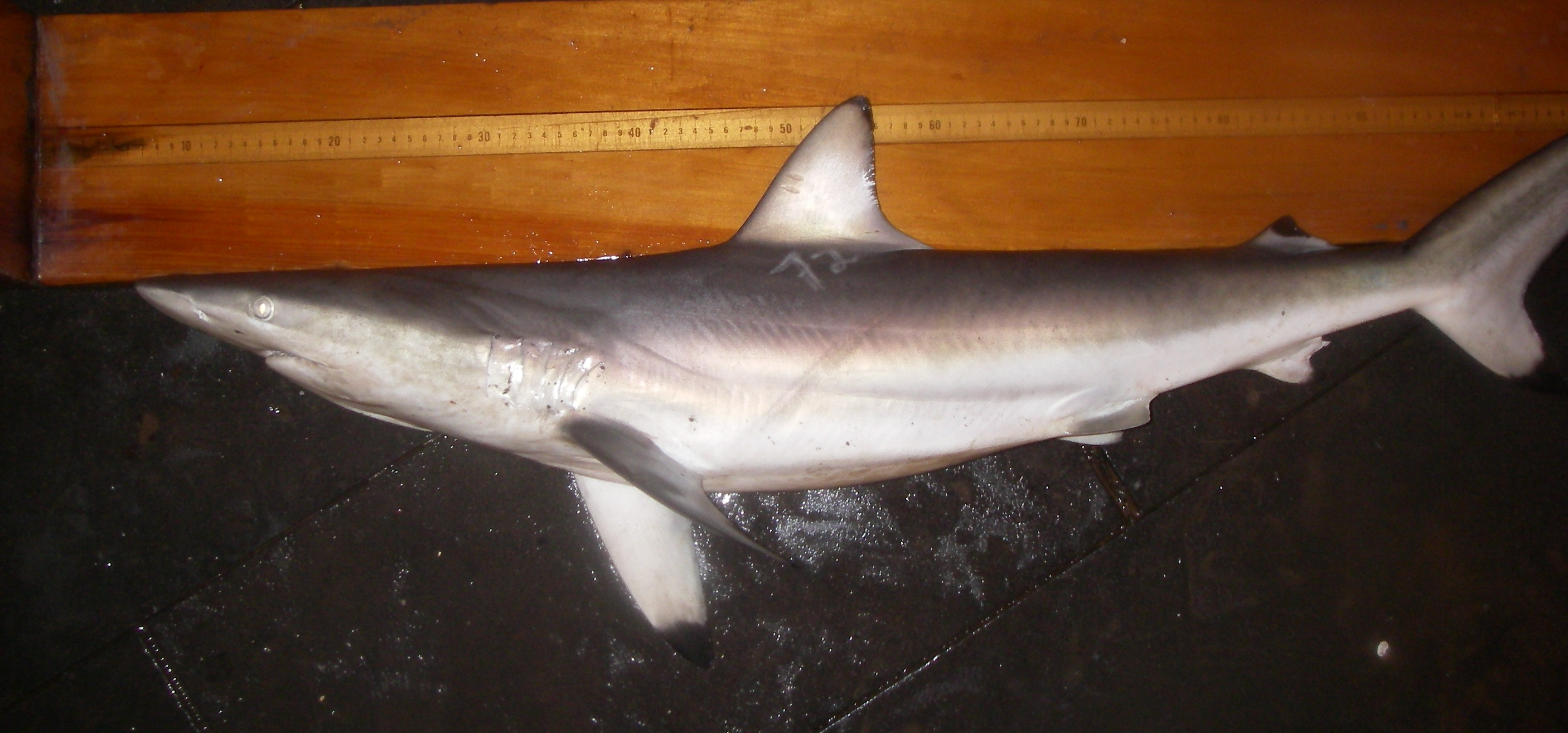
  - Spinner shark, Carcharhinus brevipinna, from the Gulf of Mexico
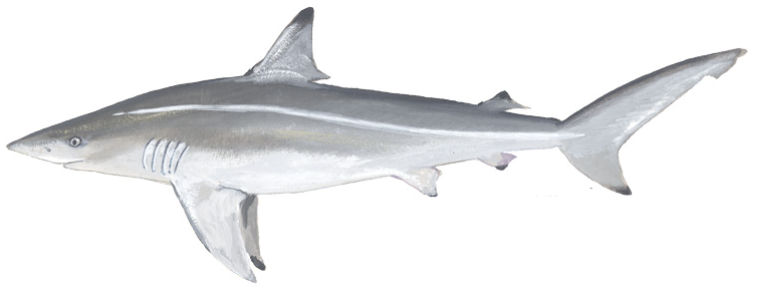
    Carcharhinus brevipinna J. P. Müller & Henle, 1839 (spinner shark)
  - Carcharhinus cautus Whitley, 1945 (nervous shark)
  - Carcharhinus cerdale C. H. Gilbert, 1898 (Pacific smalltail shark)
  - Carcharhinus coatesi Whitley, 1939 (Coates's shark)
  - Carcharhinus dussumieri J. P. Müller & Henle, 1839 (whitecheek shark)
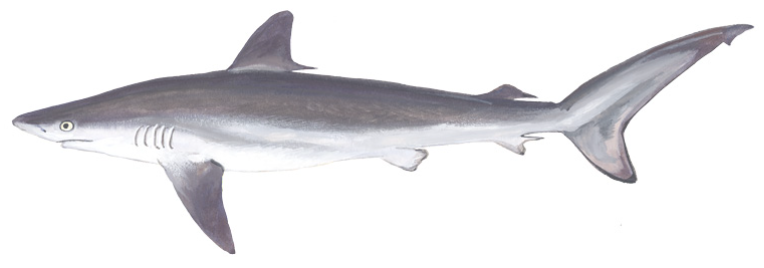
  - Carcharhinus falciformis J. P. Müller & Henle, 1839 (silky shark)
  - Carcharhinus fitzroyensis Whitley, 1943 (creek whaler)
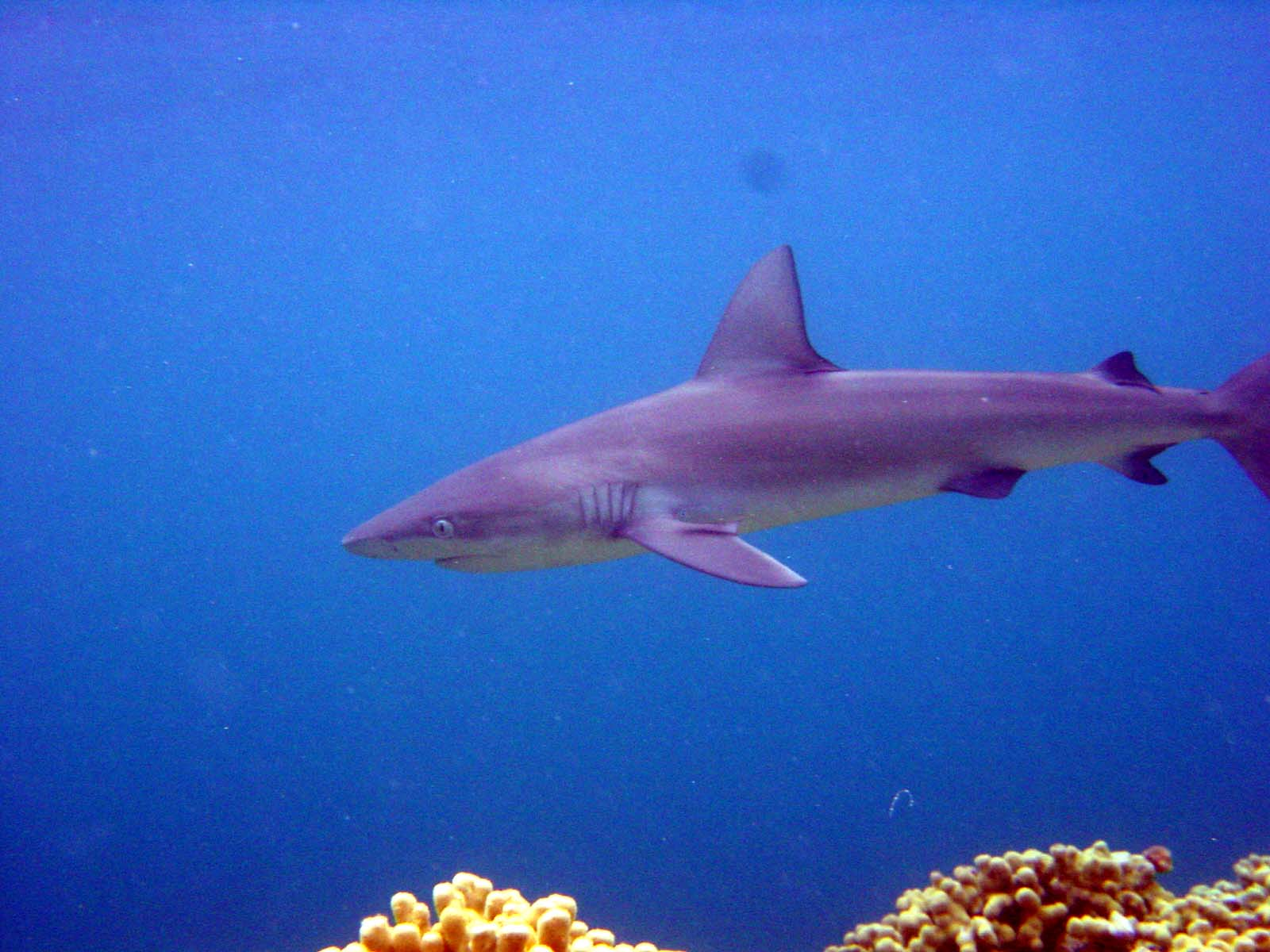
  - Galapagos shark, Carcharhinus galapagensis
    Carcharhinus galapagensis Snodgrass & Heller, 1905 (Galapagos shark)
  - Carcharhinus hemiodon J. P. Müller & Henle, 1839 (Pondicherry shark)
  - Carcharhinus humani W. T. White & Weigmann, 2014 (Human's whaler shark)
  - Carcharhinus isodon J. P. Müller & Henle, 1839 (finetooth shark)
  - Carcharhinus leiodon Garrick, 1985 (smoothtooth blacktip shark)
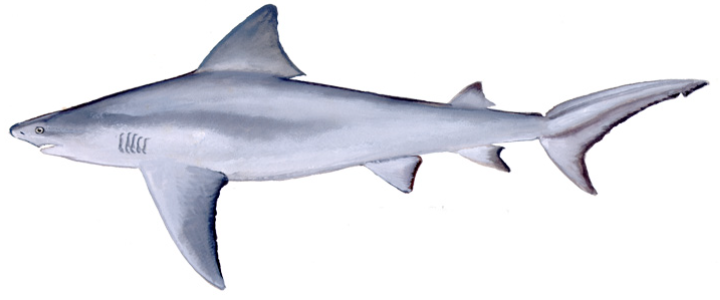
  - Carcharhinus leucas J. P. Müller & Henle, 1839 (bull shark)
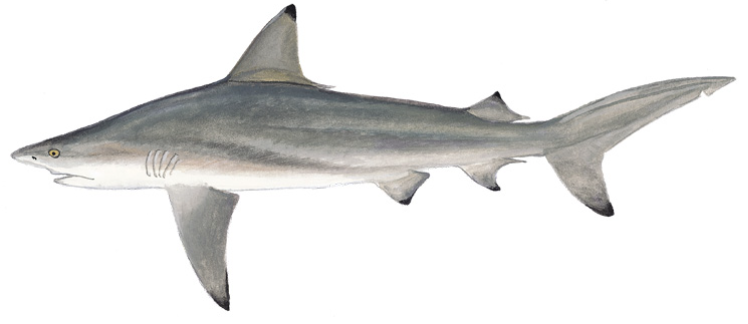
  - Carcharhinus limbatus J. P. Müller & Henle, 1839 (blacktip shark)
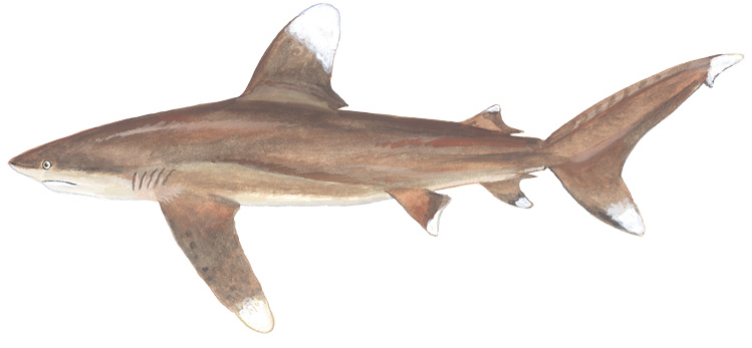
  - Carcharhinus longimanus Poey, 1861 (oceanic whitetip shark)
  - Carcharhinus macloti J. P. Müller & Henle, 1839 (hardnose shark)
  - Carcharhinus melanopterus Quoy & Gaimard, 1824 (blacktip reef shark)
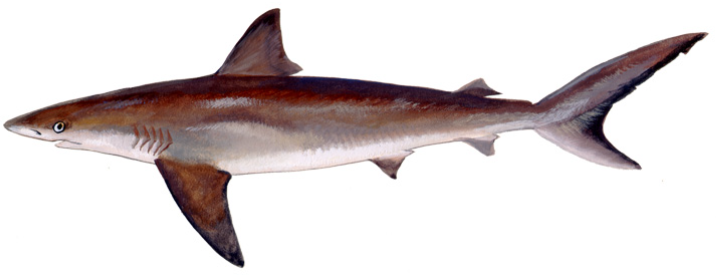
  - Carcharhinus obscurus Lesueur, 1818 (dusky shark)
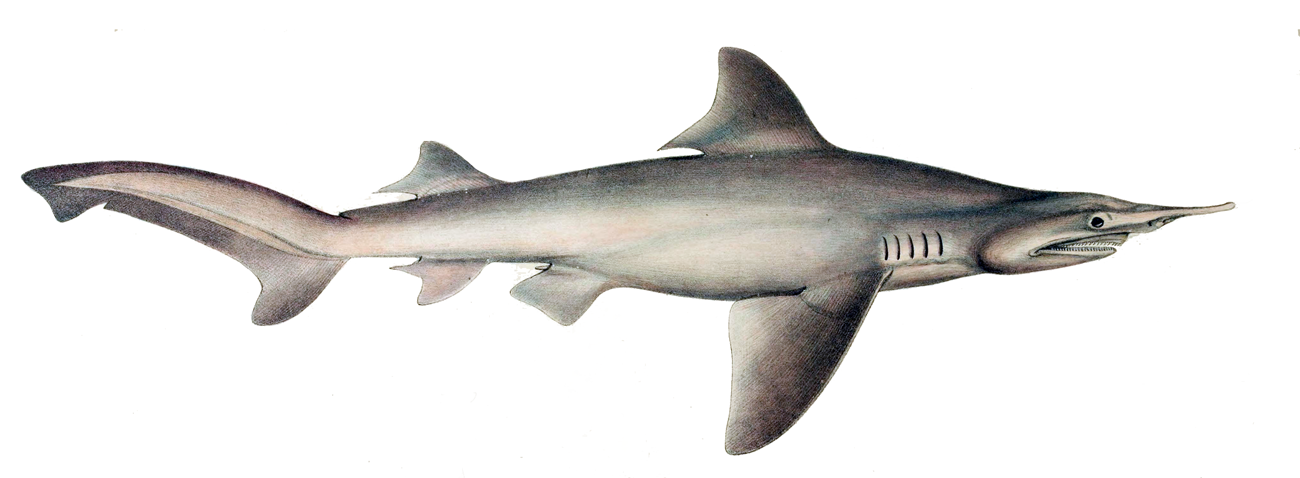
  - Carcharhinus oxyrhynchus J. P. Müller & Henle, 1839 (daggernose shark)
  - Carcharhinus perezi Poey, 1876 (Caribbean reef shark)
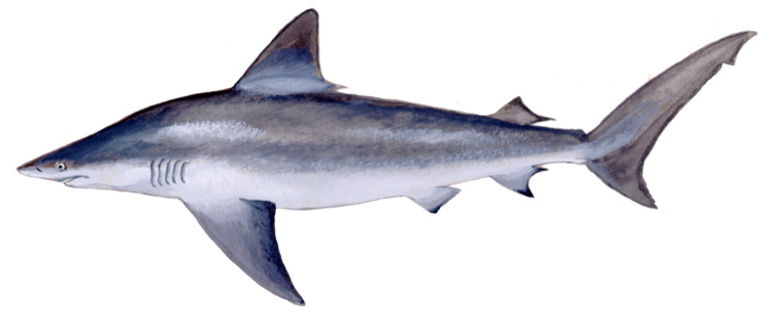
  - Carcharhinus plumbeus Nardo, 1827 (sandbar shark)
  - Carcharhinus porosus Ranzani, 1839 (smalltail shark)
  - Carcharhinus sealei Pietschmann, 1913 (blackspot shark)
  - Carcharhinus signatus Poey, 1868 (night shark)
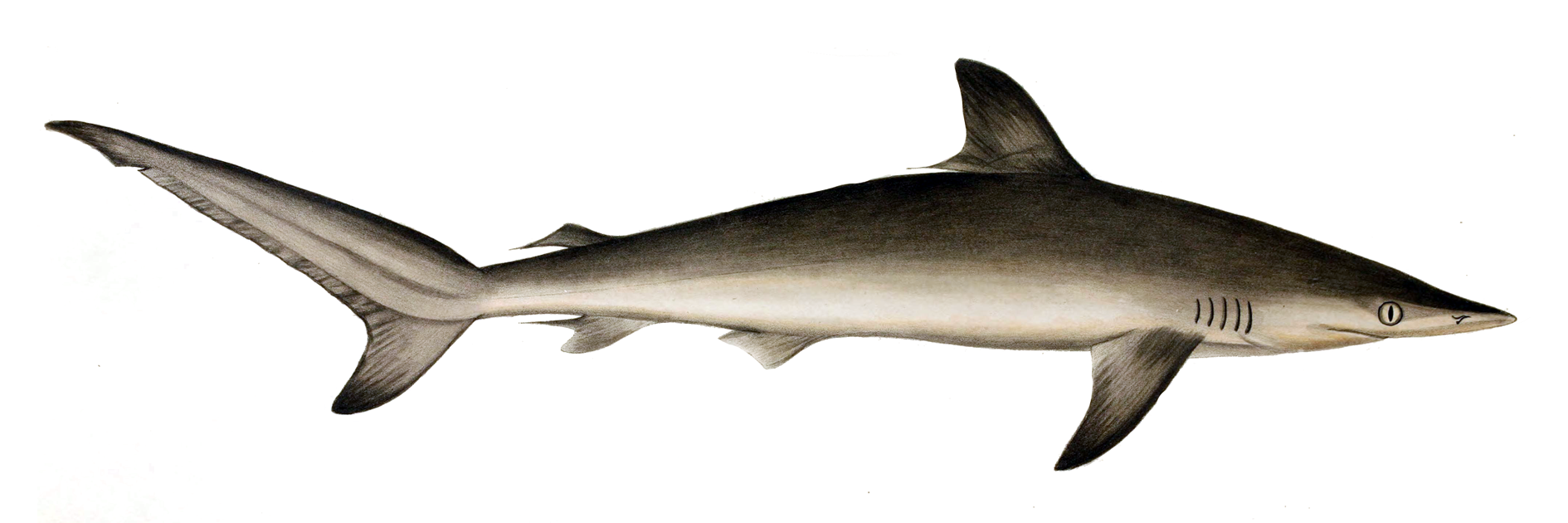
  - Carcharhinus sorrah J. P. Müller & Henle, 1839 (spot-tail shark)
  - Carcharhinus tilstoni Whitley, 1950 (Australian blacktip shark)
  - †Carcharhinus tingae
  - Carcharhinus tjutjot Bleeker, 1852 (Indonesian whaler shark)
  - †?Carcharhinus obsolerus White, Kyne, and Harris, 2019 (lost shark)
- Genus Glyphis Agassiz, 1843
  - Glyphis gangeticus J. P. Müller & Henle, 1839 (Ganges shark)
  - Glyphis garricki Compagno, W. T. White & Last, 2008 (northern river shark)
  - Glyphis glyphis J. P. Müller & Henle, 1839 (speartooth shark)
  - Glyphis sp. not yet described (Mukah river shark)
- Genus Lamiopsis Gill, 1862
  - Lamiopsis temminckii J. P. Müller & Henle, 1839 (broadfin shark)
  - Lamiopsis tephrodes Fowler, 1905 (Borneo broadfin shark)
- Genus Nasolamia Compagno & Garrick, 1983
  - Nasolamia velox C. H. Gilbert, 1898 (whitenose shark)
- Genus Negaprion Whitley, 1940
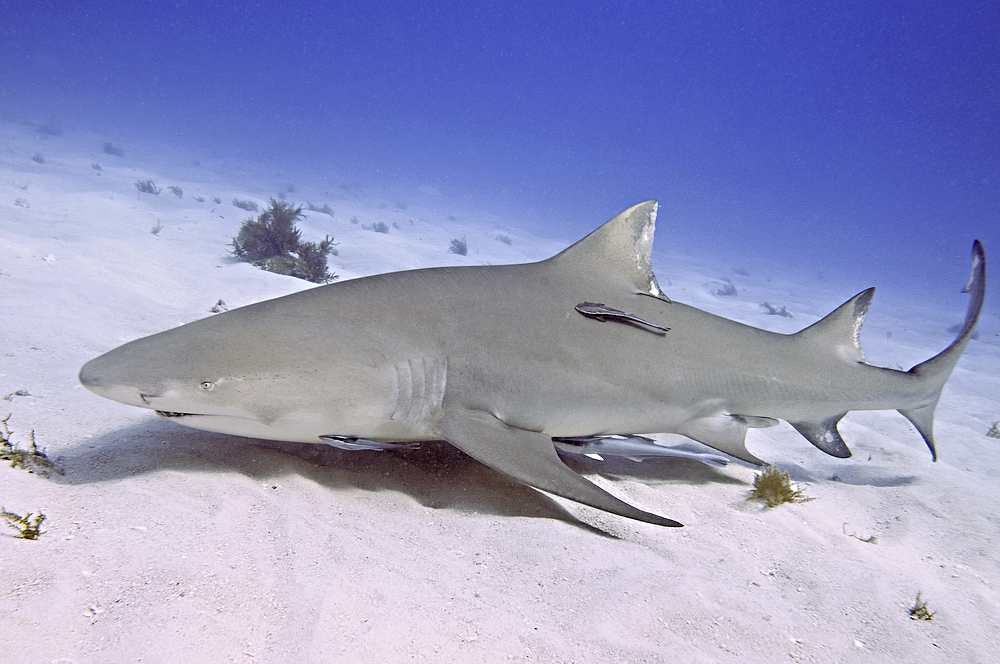
  - Lemon shark, Negaprion brevirostris, at Tiger Beach, Bahamas
    Negaprion acutidens Rüppell, 1837 (sicklefin lemon shark)
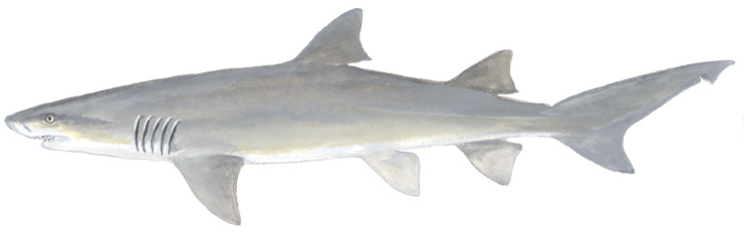
  - Negaprion brevirostris Poey, 1868 (lemon shark)
  - †Negaprion eurybathrodon Blake, 1862
  - †Negaprion gilmorei Leriche, 1942
- Genus Prionace Cantor, 1849
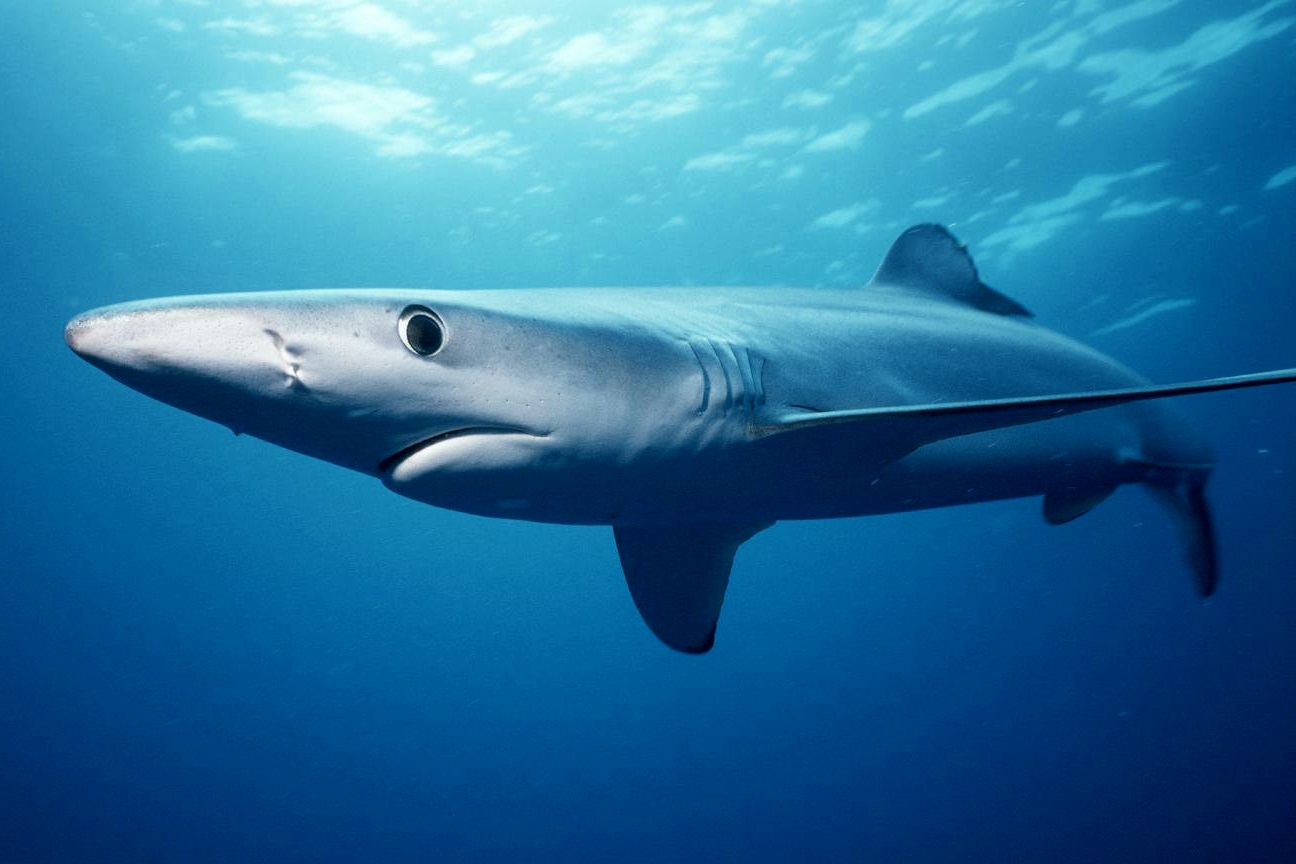
  - Blue shark, Prionace glauca
    Prionace glauca Linnaeus
  - †Prionace clarki Mount, 1969
- Genus Rhizoprionodon Whitley, 1929
  - Rhizoprionodon acutus Rüppell, 1837 (milk shark)
  - Rhizoprionodon lalandii J. P. Müller & Henle, 1839 (Brazilian sharpnose shark)
  - Rhizoprionodon longurio D. S. Jordan & C. H. Gilbert, 1882 (Pacific sharpnose shark)
  - Rhizoprionodon oligolinx V. G. Springer, 1964 (grey sharpnose shark)
  - Rhizoprionodon porosus Poey, 1861 (Caribbean sharpnose shark)
  - Rhizoprionodon taylori Ogilby, 1915 (Australian sharpnose shark)
  - Rhizoprionodon terraenovae J. Richardson, 1836 (Atlantic sharpnose shark)
- Genus Loxodon J. P. Müller & Henle, 1838
  - Loxodon macrorhinus J. P. Müller & Henle, 1839 (sliteye shark)
- Genus Triaenodon J. P. Müller & Henle, 1837
  - Triaenodon obesus Rüppell, 1837 (whitetip reef shark)

== See also ==
- Freshwater shark

== Sources ==
Compagno, Leonard J.V. (1984). FAO species catalogue Vol.4. Sharks of the world. An annotated and illustrated catalogue of shark species known to date. Part 2. Carcharhiniformes (PDF). Rome: Food and Agriculture Organization of the United Nations. ISBN 92-5-101383-7.
