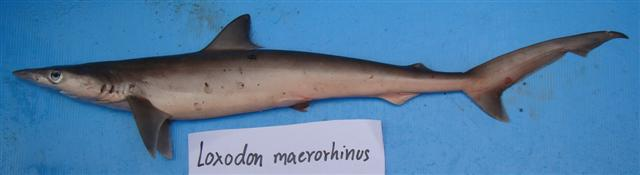

Conservation status
- Near Threatened (IUCN 3.1)

Scientific classification
- Kingdom: Animalia
- Phylum: Chordata
- Class: Chondrichthyes
- Subclass: Elasmobranchii
- Division: Selachii
- Order: Carcharhiniformes
- Family: Carcharhinidae
- Genus: Loxodon; J. P. Müller & Henle, 1838
- Species: L. macrorhinus

Binomial name
- Loxodon macrorhinus J. P. Müller & Henle, 1839
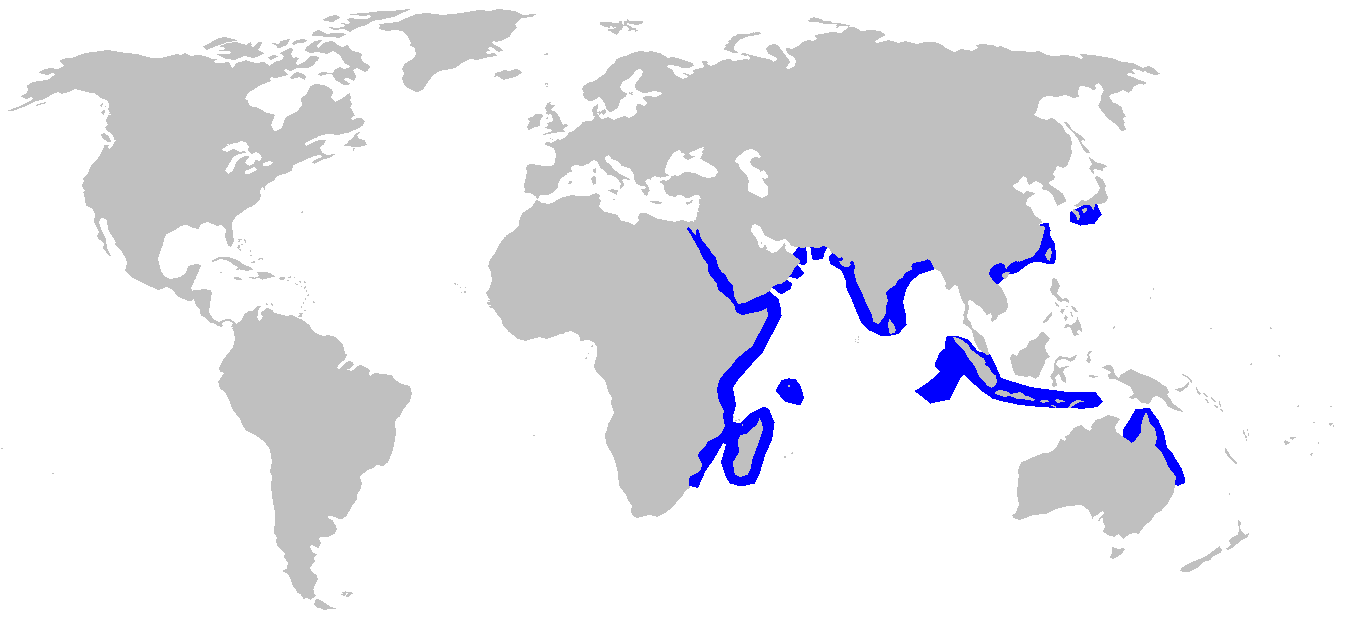
- Range of the sliteye shark

= Sliteye shark =

Species of shark

The sliteye shark (Loxodon macrorhinus) is a species of requiem shark, in the family Carcharhinidae, and the only member of its genus. It is found in the tropical waters of the Indo-West Pacific between latitudes 34° N and 30° S, from depths of 7 to 100 metres (23 to 328 ft). It can reach a length of about 95 centimetres (37 in).

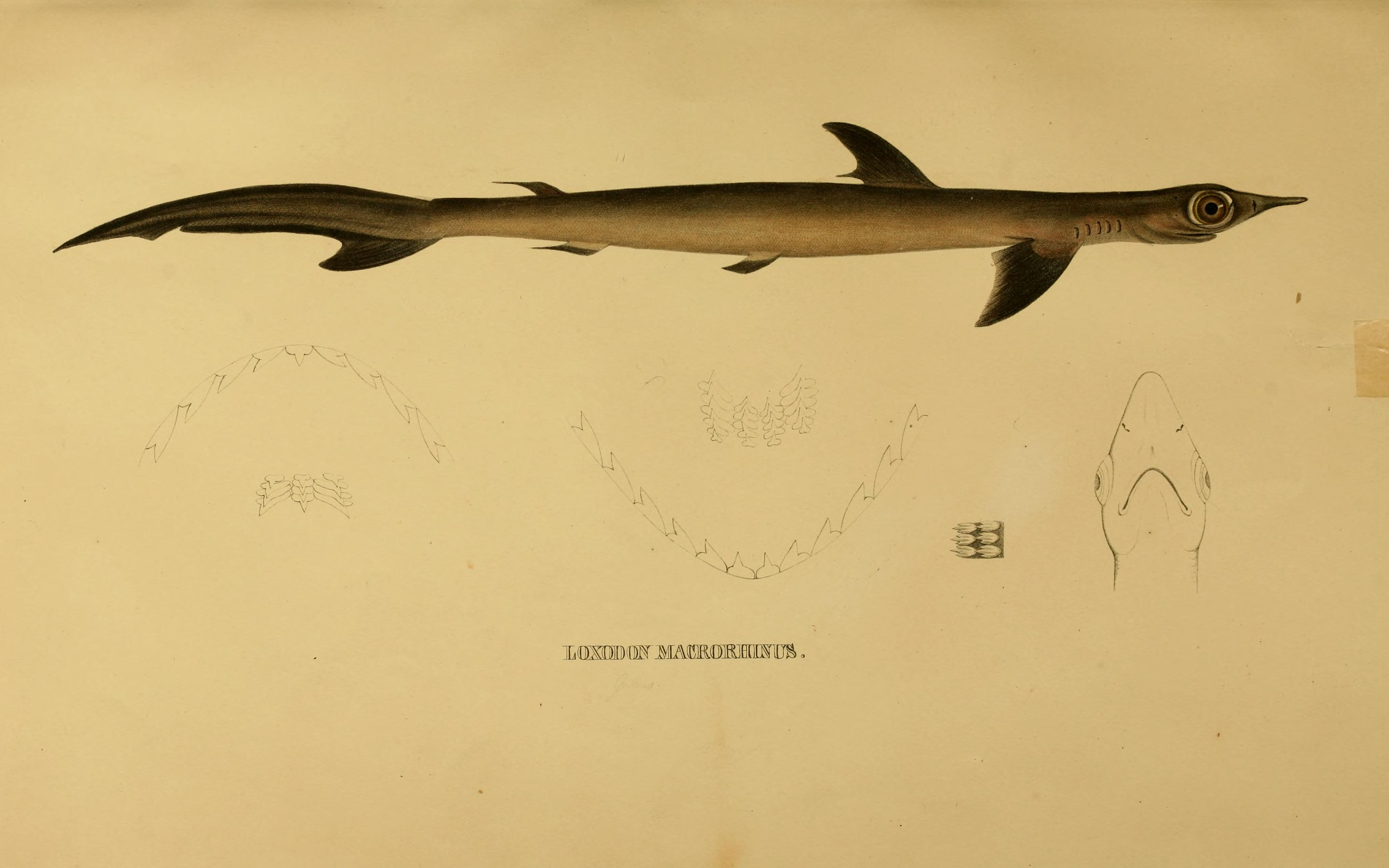
Illustration accompanying first description of Loxodon macrohinus.
