= Blacktip =

Blacktip may refer to:

- Australian blacktip shark, an Oceanian shark
- Blacktip grouper, a widely distributed grouper
- Blacktip reef shark, an Indo-Pacific shark
- Blacktip sawtail catshark, a West Pacific shark
- Blacktip shark, a widely distributed shark
- Blacktip tope, an Indo-West Pacific shark
- Blacktip trevally, a jack fish
- Smooth tooth blacktip shark, a Gulf of Aden shark
- Euchloe charlonia, a butterfly sometimes called the blacktip
- Blacktips (FXFL), an American football team
