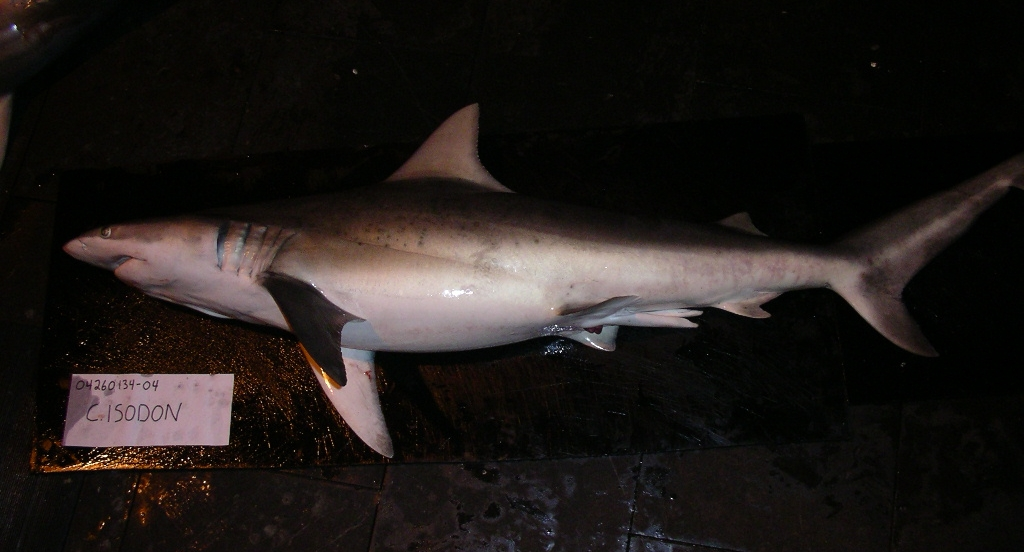

Conservation status
- Near Threatened (IUCN 3.1)

Scientific classification
- Kingdom: Animalia
- Phylum: Chordata
- Class: Chondrichthyes
- Subclass: Elasmobranchii
- Division: Selachii
- Order: Carcharhiniformes
- Family: Carcharhinidae
- Genus: Carcharhinus
- Species: C. isodon

Binomial name
- Carcharhinus isodon (J. P. Müller & Henle, 1839)
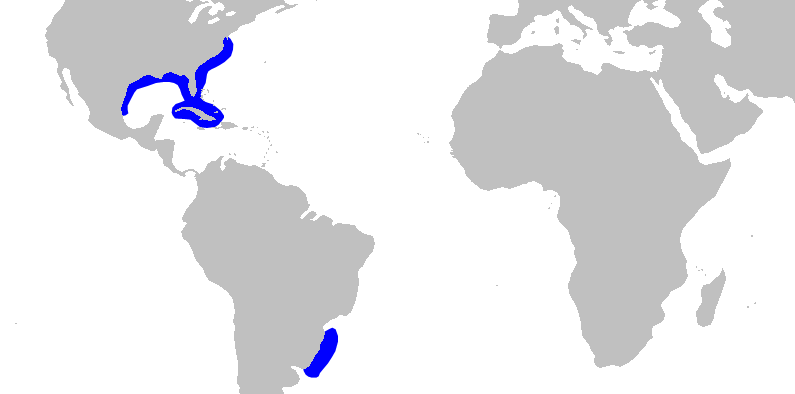
- Range of the finetooth shark

Synonyms
- Aprionodon punctatus Gill, 1861; Carcharias isodon Valenciennes in J. P. Müller & Henle, 1839

= Finetooth shark =

Species of shark

The finetooth shark (Carcharhinus isodon) is a species of requiem shark, in the family Carcharhinidae, found in the western Atlantic Ocean, from North Carolina to Brazil. It forms large schools in shallow, coastal waters, and migrates seasonally following warm water. A relatively small, slender-bodied shark, the finetooth shark can be identified by its needle-like teeth, dark blue-gray dorsal coloration, and long gill slits. It attains a maximum length of 1.9 m (6.2 ft). The diet of this species consists primarily of small bony fishes, in particular menhaden. Like other members of its family, it is viviparous with females giving birth to two to six pups in estuarine nursery areas every other year.

Valued for its meat, the finetooth shark forms an important component of the commercial gillnet shark fishery operating off the southeastern United States. Population assessments suggest that this fishery does not currently pose a threat to U.S. populations of the species. This shark is not known to pose a danger to humans, though it snaps vigorously when captured and should be handled with caution.

== Taxonomy and phylogeny ==
The finetooth shark was originally described as Carcharias (Aprionodon) isodon by French zoologist Achille Valenciennes, in Müller and Henle's 1839 Systematische Beschreibung der Plagiostomen. The type specimen is a 65-cm (26-in) juvenile male, possibly caught off New York. This species was later moved to the genus Carcharhinus. The specific epithet isodon means "equal teeth" in Greek, and refers to the similar number of teeth in the upper and lower jaws. This species may also be referred to as the eventooth shark, smoothtooth shark, or night shark (usually used for C. signatus).

As is the case for most Carcharhinus species, attempts to analyze the finetooth shark's phylogenetic relationships have yielded variable results. In 1988, Leonard Compagno grouped this species with the spinner shark (C. brevipinna), blacktip shark (C. limbatus), graceful shark (C. amblyrhynchoides), and smooth tooth blacktip shark (C. leiodon), on the basis of morphological characters. Gavin Naylor's 1992 allozyme analysis found that the finetooth shark is the second-most basal member of the genus next to the blacknose shark (C. acronotus). Mine Dosay-Akbulut's 2008 study, based on ribosomal DNA, suggested that the closest relative of the finetooth shark is the smalltail shark (C. porosus), and that the two species form a clade apart from other Carcharhinus species.

== Description ==
The body of the finetooth shark is slender and streamlined. The snout is long and pointed, with the nares preceded by short, broadly triangular flaps of skin. The eyes are large and round, with nictitating membranes (protective third eyelids). The mouth is broad with well-defined furrows at the corners. Twelve to 15 tooth rows occur on either side of the upper jaw and 13–14 tooth rows on either side of the lower jaw. Each tooth is small and needle-like, with a narrow central cusp and smooth to minutely serrated edges. The five pairs of gill slits are long, measuring about half the length of the dorsal fin base.

The first dorsal fin is high and triangular with a pointed apex, originating forward of the free rear tips of the pectoral fins. The second dorsal fin is relatively large and originates over the anal fin. No ridge runs between the dorsal fins. The pectoral fins are small and sickle-shaped, with pointed tips. The dermal denticles are small and overlapping, each bearing three horizontal ridges leading to marginal teeth. Living finetooth sharks are a distinctive dark bluish-gray above and white below, with a faint pale stripe on the flanks and no prominent fin markings. Some individuals from Florida have green eyes. Males average 1.6 m (5.2 ft) in length and females 1.7 m (5.4 ft); the largest shark on record was 1.9 m (6.2 ft) long.

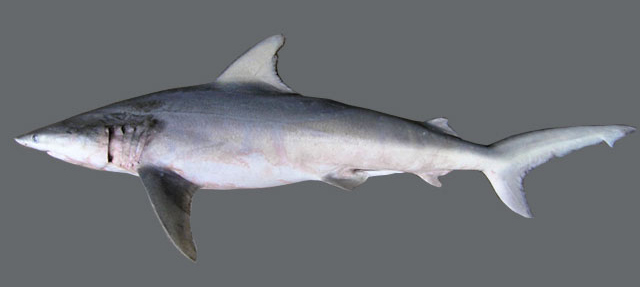
Distinguishing traits of the finetooth shark include its long gill slits and slender teeth

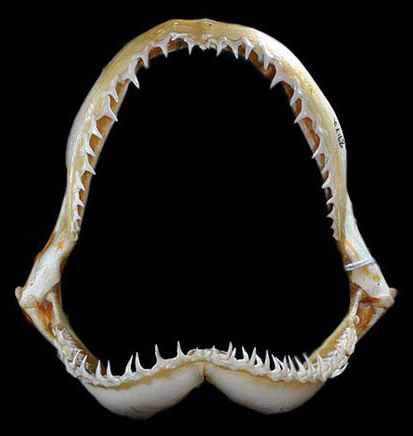
Jaws

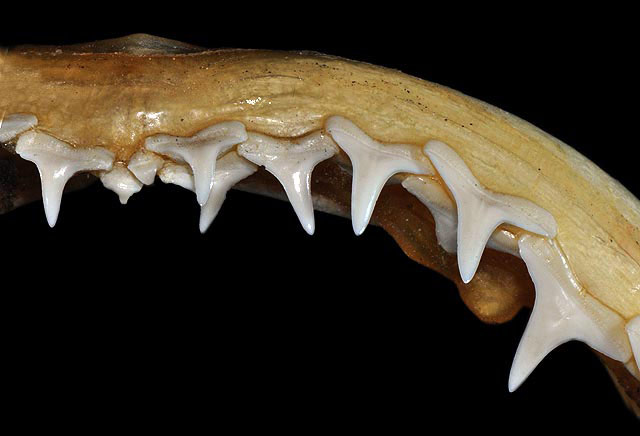
Upper teeth

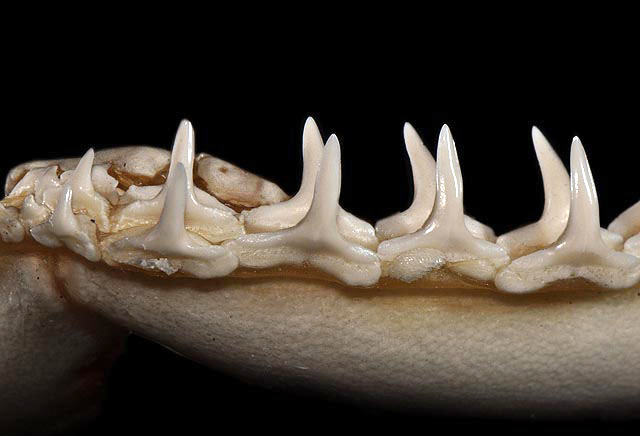
Lower teeth

== Distribution and habitat ==
In North American waters, the finetooth shark is common and found from North Carolina to the northern Gulf of Mexico, and very occasionally straying as far north as New York. In Central and South American waters, it is rare, but may occur more widely than presently known, having been reported off Trinidad and Guyana, infrequently from the Caribbean Sea, and off southern Brazil from São Paulo to Santa Catarina. The northwestern Atlantic, Gulf of Mexico, and South America populations are distinct, with little interchange between them. Old records exist of this species in the eastern Atlantic off Senegal and Guinea-Bissau, but these likely represent misidentifications of spinner sharks (C. brevipinna).

The finetooth shark is often found near beaches and in bays and estuaries. It inhabits extremely shallow waters, no deeper than 10 m (33 ft) in the summer and 20 m (66 ft) deep in the winter. Historically, it was known to venture into rivers in the Gulf Coastal Plain of Texas, though most of paths into this area are now blocked by dams. The northwestern Atlantic population of this species is strongly migratory: juveniles, followed by adults, arrive off South Carolina from late March to early May, when the water temperature rises above 20 °C (68 °F). They remain until September to mid-October, until the water temperature drops and they move south to Florida. The movements of other populations are unknown.

== Biology and ecology ==
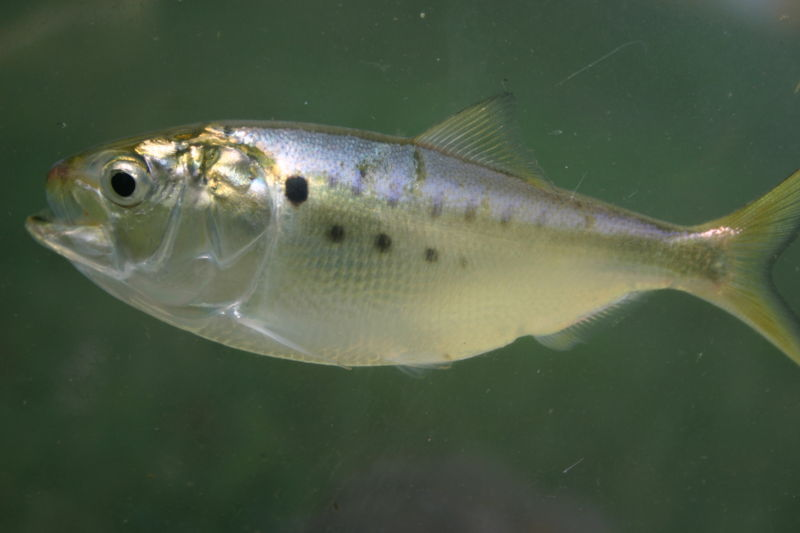
The Atlantic menhaden is the most important prey of finetooth sharks in the northwestern Atlantic.

Adult and juvenile finetooth sharks form large schools. This energetic, fast-moving predator feeds mainly on small bony fishes, often entering the surf zone during the day to hunt. The most important prey of this species in the northwestern Atlantic is the Atlantic menhaden (Brevoortia tyrannus), with sharks of all ages off northwestern Florida eating almost nothing else. The menhaden are swallowed whole after the head has been removed. Other known prey species include spot croaker (Leiostomus xanthurus), Spanish mackerel (Scomberomorus maculatus), mullet (Mugil spp.), shrimp, and in one case a juvenile Atlantic sharpnose shark (Rhizoprionodon terraenovae), which may have been scavenged from the bycatch discard of a shrimp trawler. The finetooth shark may be preyed upon by larger sharks. Parasites documented from this species include the tapeworm Triloculatum geeceearelensis, and unidentified species in the genera Anthobothrium, Paraorygmatobothrium, and Phoreiobothrium.

=== Life history ===
Like other requiem sharks, the finetooth shark is viviparous: the developing embryos are nourished by yolk for the first 15 weeks, after which the depleted yolk sac develops into a placental connection to the mother. Females produce litters of two to six pups every other year. In the northwestern Atlantic, mating occurs from early May to early June and the young are born at around the same time the following year after a 12-month gestation period. The males bite at the female to hold her for copulation. The semen exuded by the male congeals into a large, spongy mass inside the female's uterus, in which the individual spermatozoa are embedded. Called a "spermatozeugma", the function of this short-lived structure is unknown. Newborn finetooth sharks measure 48–64 cm (19–25 in) long. Shallow bays and estuaries, such as Bull's Bay in South Carolina, serve as critical nursery areas for newborns and juveniles.

Female finetooth sharks grow much more slowly and to a larger ultimate size than males. Individuals in the northwestern Atlantic population have a larger body size and reach sexual maturation later than those in the Gulf of Mexico population; males in the two populations grow at similar rates, but northwestern Atlantic females grow more slowly than Gulf of Mexico females. In the northwestern Atlantic, males mature at a fork length (length from snout tip to caudal fin fork) of 99 cm (39 in) and females at 102 cm (40 in), corresponding to ages of 5 and 6 years, respectively. In the Gulf of Mexico, males mature at a fork length of 94 cm (37 in) and females at 99 cm (39 in), corresponding to ages of 4 and 5 years, respectively. The maximum lifespan has been estimated to be at least 9 years for males and 14 years for females.

== Human interactions ==
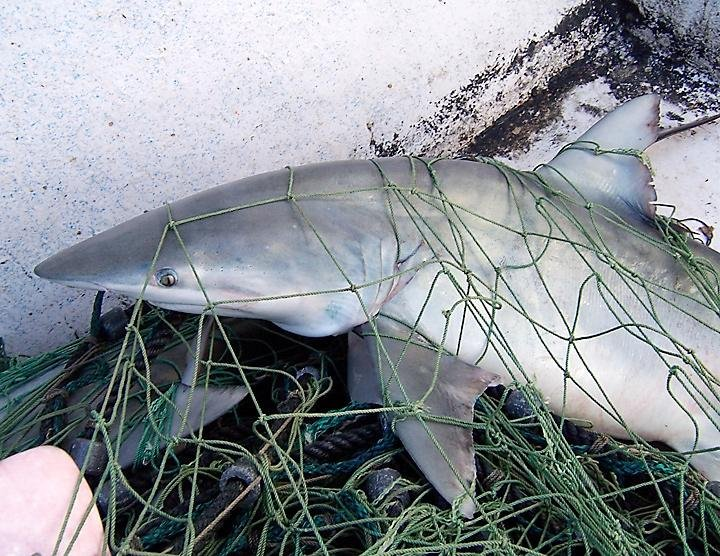
The finetooth shark is caught for meat off the southeastern United States.

The finetooth shark has never been implicated in an attack on humans. Finetooth sharks are used for human consumption fresh or dried and salted. Other than off the southeastern United States, this species is of little commercial importance: it is small and occurs in water too shallow for most commercial and recreational fisheries, and is generally too fast-swimming to be caught by shrimp trawlers. Small numbers are taken incidentally by floating longlines and on hook-and-line. This species is susceptible to overfishing due to its low reproductive rate, and to habitat degradation due to its inshore habits.

Substantial numbers of finetooth sharks are caught in drift gillnets operated by the shark fishery off southeastern United States, which peaked in 1999 at about 117 tons landed. Stock assessments conducted in 2002 suggested that U.S. populations had not yet been overfished, but that the catch rate was unsustainable, whereas assessments conducted in 2007 concluded that catch rates did not exceed sustainable levels and that populations were stable. Fishing for this species in U.S. waters is regulated by the National Marine Fisheries Service 1993 Fisheries Management Plan for Atlantic and Gulf of Mexico sharks; it is classified as a "small coastal shark" for the purposes of commercial quotas and recreational bag limits. As a result, the IUCN has assessed the finetooth shark as Near Threatened overall and off the U.S. and Mexico. Concern exists for this species in South America, where its numbers seem naturally low and it is potentially under heavy pressure by widespread, intensive coastal fisheries.

== Gallery ==
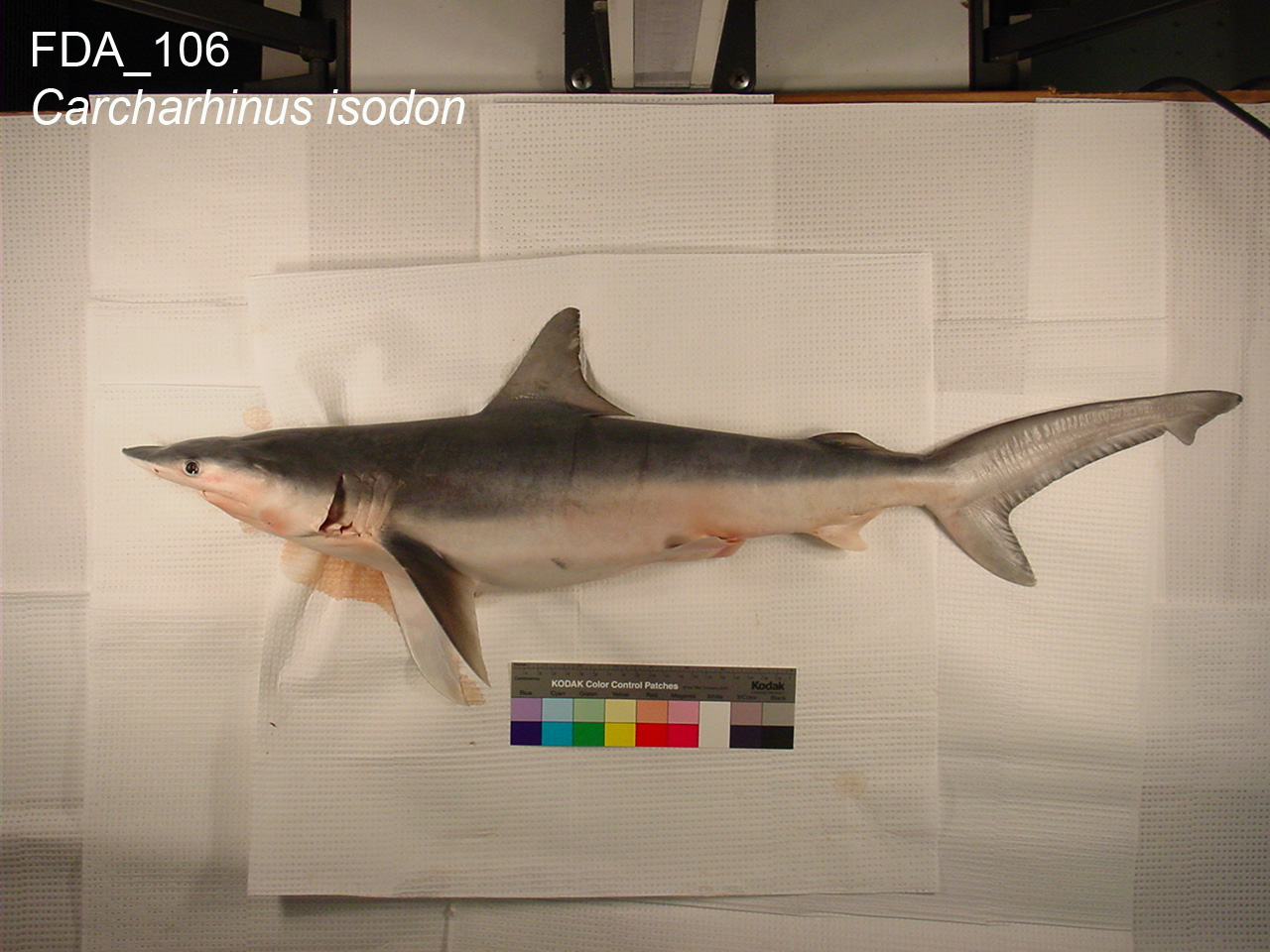
Scaled

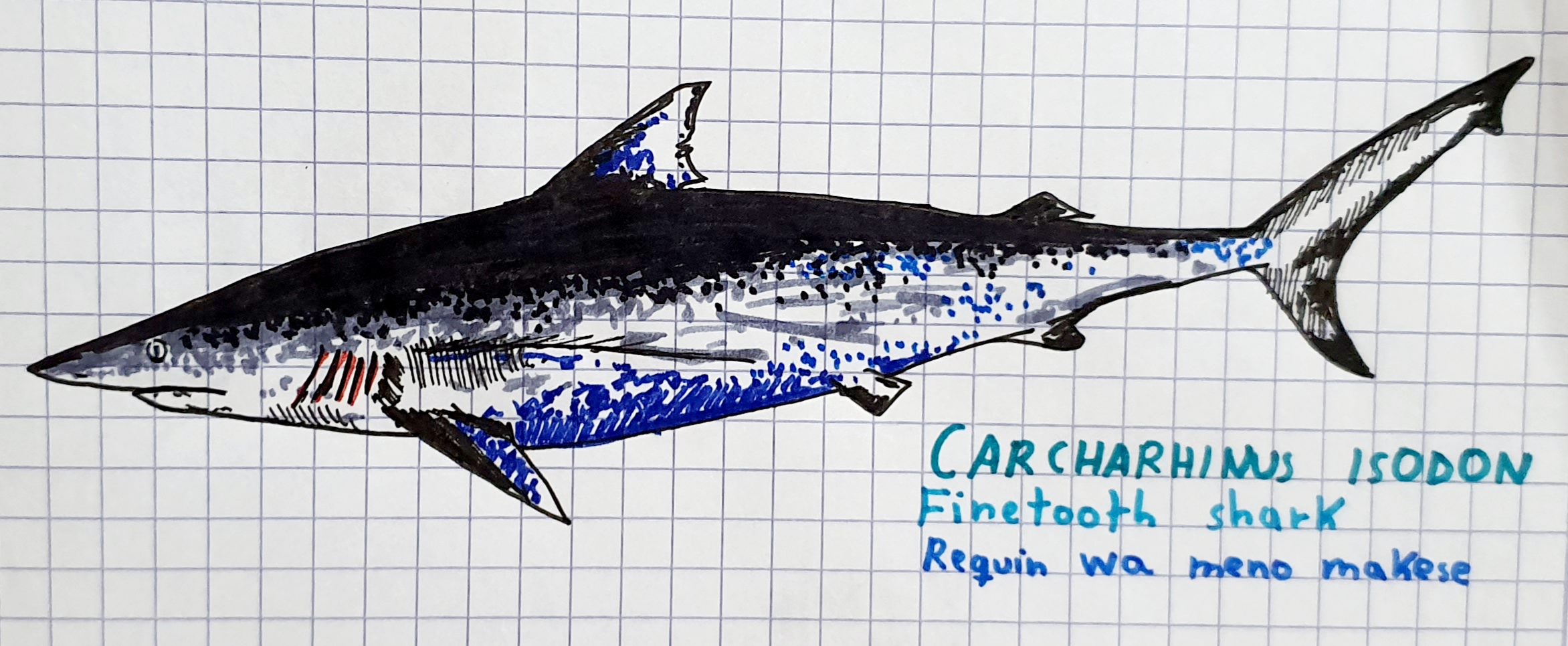
Illustration

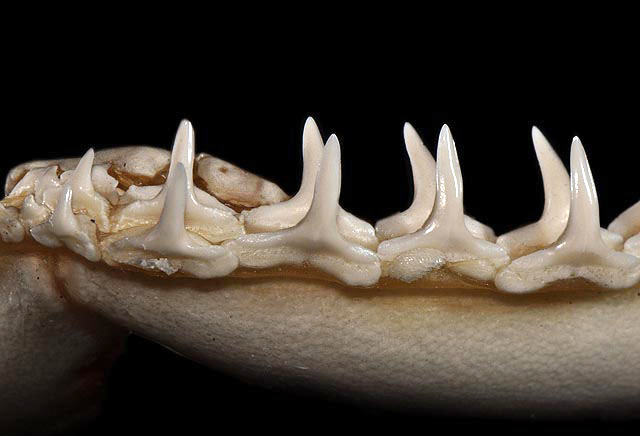
Teeth
