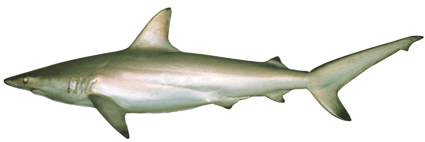

Conservation status
- Least Concern (IUCN 3.1)

Scientific classification
- Kingdom: Animalia
- Phylum: Chordata
- Class: Chondrichthyes
- Subclass: Elasmobranchii
- Division: Selachii
- Order: Carcharhiniformes
- Family: Carcharhinidae
- Genus: Carcharhinus
- Species: C. tilstoni

Binomial name
- Carcharhinus tilstoni (Whitley, 1950)
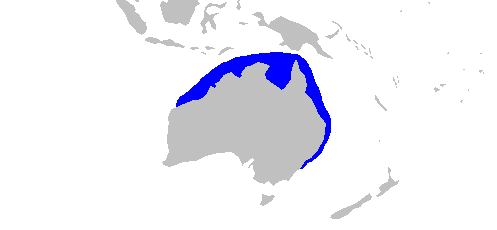
- Range of the Australian blacktip shark

Synonyms
- Galeolamna pleurotaenia tilstoni Whitley, 1950

= Australian blacktip shark =

Species of shark

The Australian blacktip shark (Carcharhinus tilstoni) is a species of requiem shark, in the family Carcharhinidae, endemic to northern and eastern Australia. Favoring the upper and middle parts of the water column, it can be found from the intertidal zone to a depth of 50 m (160 ft). Appearance-wise this species is virtually identical to the common blacktip shark (C. limbatus), from which it can be reliably distinguished only by its lower vertebra number and by genetic markers. Generally reaching 1.5–1.8 m (4.9–5.9 ft) in length, it is a fairly stout-bodied, bronze-colored shark with a long snout and black-tipped fins.

Primarily piscivorous, the Australian blacktip shark forms large groups of similar size and sex that tend to remain within a local area. It exhibits viviparity, meaning that the unborn young are provisioned through a placental connection. There is a well-defined annual reproductive cycle with mating occurring in February and March. Females bear one to six pups around January of the following year, after a 10-month gestation period. The Australian blacktip shark is among the sharks most commonly caught by northern Australian commercial fisheries. It is mainly valued for its meat, which is sold as "flake". This species was an important catch of a Taiwanese gillnet fishery that operated from 1974 to 1986, and of the Australian Northern Shark Fishery that continues to the present day. As current fishing levels are not thought to threaten this shark's population, the International Union for Conservation of Nature (IUCN) has assessed it as Least Concern.

== Taxonomy and phylogeny ==
The Australian blacktip shark was described by Australian ichthyologist Gilbert Percy Whitley in a 1950 issue of the scientific journal Western Australian Naturalist. He named it Galeolamna pleurotaenia tilstoni in honor of Richard Tilston, assistant surgeon at Port Essington, Northern Territory. The type specimen is a 1.5 m (4.9 ft) long female caught from Van Cloon Reef in Joseph Bonaparte Gulf. Later authors have regarded Galeolamna as a synonym of the genus Carcharhinus. This shark may also be referred to as blacktip whaler, Tilston's whaler shark, and Whitley's blacktip shark.

After Whitley's initial description, C. tilstoni was generally regarded as synonymous with C. limbatus, the common blacktip shark. In the 1980s, additional morphological and life history data again favored the recognition of C. tilstoni as a separate species, which was eventually confirmed by allozyme studies performed by Shane Lavery and James Shaklee. Several molecular phylogenetic studies based on allozymes, mitochondrial DNA, and nuclear DNA have found that the Australian and common blacktip sharks form a closely related clade with the graceful shark (C. amblyrhynchoides) and the smoothtooth blacktip shark (C. leiodon). The interrelationships between them have not been fully resolved, but available data suggest that C. tilstoni and C. limbatus are not the most closely related species within the clade despite their similarity.

== Description ==
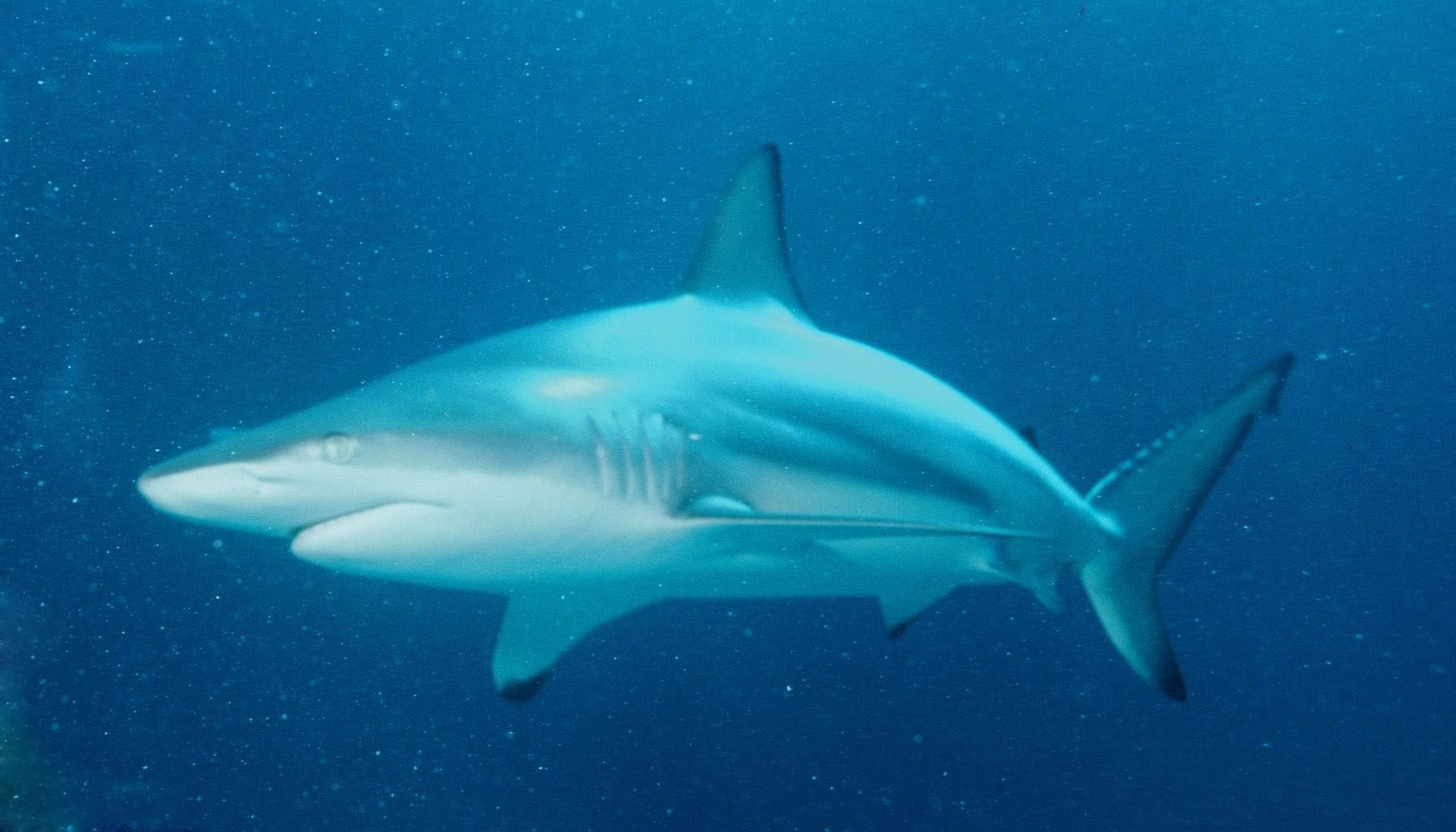
The common blacktip shark (pictured) is nearly identical in appearance to the Australian blacktip shark.

Physically, the Australian blacktip shark can only reliably be distinguished from the common blacktip shark by the number of vertebrae (174–182 total, 84–91 before the tail in C. tilstoni, 182–203 total, 94–102 before the tail in C. limbatus). It has a moderately robust, spindle-shaped body and a long, pointed snout. The anterior rims of the nostrils are slightly enlarged into low triangular flaps. The large, circular eyes are equipped with nictitating membranes. The furrows at the corners of the mouth are barely evident. There are 32–35 upper and 29–31 lower tooth rows; each upper tooth has a slender, upright cusp and fine serrations that become coarser near the base, while the lower teeth are narrower and more finely serrated. The five pairs of gill slits are long.

The long and narrow pectoral fins are falcate (sickle-shaped) with pointed tips. The large first dorsal fin is also falcate and originates over or slightly behind the rear of the pectoral fin bases. The second dorsal fin is moderately tall and positioned about opposite the anal fin. There is no midline ridge between the dorsal fins. A crescent-shaped notch is present on the caudal peduncle just before the upper caudal fin origin. The caudal fin is asymmetrical, with a strong lower lobe and a longer upper lobe with a ventral notch near the tip. The roughly diamond-shaped dermal denticles are placed closely together and slightly overlapping; each bears five to seven (three in juveniles) horizontal ridges leading to marginal teeth. The Australian blacktip shark is bronze above (gray after death) and whitish below, with a pale stripe on the flanks. Some individuals have black tips on all fins, while others have unmarked pelvic and anal fins. It typically reaches 1.5–1.8 m (4.9–5.9 ft) long; the maximum length and weight on record are 2.0 m (6.6 ft) and 52 kg (115 lb).

== Distribution and habitat ==
Inhabiting the continental shelf, the Australian blacktip shark is found from Thevenard Island in Western Australia to Sydney in New South Wales. Within its range, it co-occurs with the common blacktip shark; the ratio between C. limbatus and C. tilstoni was once thought to be 1:300, but recent genetic studies have found it to be closer to 50:50. This species has been reported from the intertidal zone to a depth of 150 m (490 ft); larger sharks tend to occur in deeper water. Though it occupies the entire water column, it is most common close to the surface or in midwater. Genetic data suggest Australian blacktip sharks across northern Australia are all members of a single population. Tagging studies have found this species mostly moves only short distances along the coastline and rarely enters offshore waters. However, some individuals have been recorded traveling longer distances, up to 1,348 km (838 mi).

== Biology and ecology ==
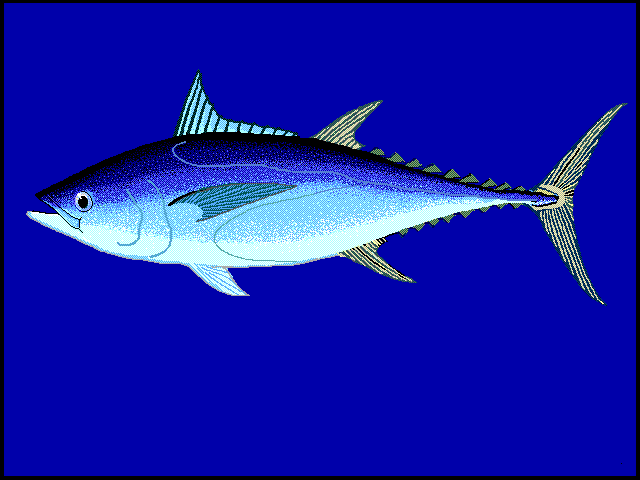
The longtail tuna is known to be preyed upon by the Australian blacktip shark.

The Australian blacktip shark is known to form large groups, segregated by size and sex. It preys mainly on teleost fishes, including ponyfishes, grunters, tunas, and herring. Cephalopods are a secondary food source, which are particularly important around April. This species also occasionally consumes smaller sharks, including snaggletooth sharks (Hemipristis pristis), spottail sharks (C. sorrah), and sharpnose sharks (Rhizoprionodon). Their diets shift with age: smaller individuals feed on proportionately more bottom-dwelling fish, while larger individuals feed on proportionately more midwater fish and cephalopods. Documented parasites of this shark include the tapeworms Fossobothrium perplexum and Platybothrium sp., and the copepod Perissopus dentatus.

Like other requiem sharks, the Australian blacktip shark is viviparous: once the embryos exhaust their yolk supply, the depleted yolk sac develops into a placental connection through which the mother provides sustenance. Females bear litters of one to six pups (average three) every year. Mating takes place in February and March, with the females storing the sperm until ovulation in March and April. After a gestation period of 10 months, the young are born around January of the following year. Near-term females move into shallow, coastal nurseries, such as Cleveland Bay in northern Queensland, to give birth. Such nursery areas appear to be widespread, as newborns have been recorded throughout the range of the species. The newborns are relatively large, measuring about 60 cm (24 in) long. They grow rapidly in their first year, increasing in length by an average of 17 cm (6.7 in). The growth rate subsequently slows, averaging 8–10 cm (3.1–3.9 in) per year by age five. Both sexes attain sexual maturity at three to four years of age, at lengths of roughly 1.1 and 1.2 m (3.6 and 3.9 ft) for males and females, respectively. The maximum lifespan is estimated to be 20 years.

Hybrids between the Australian blacktip shark and the common blacktip shark, comprising both F1 and backcrossed individuals, have been discovered all along the eastern coast of Australia. Despite the widespread incidence of hybridization, there is no evidence that the two parental lineages are merging and the mechanisms preventing introgression are unclear. This is the first confirmed case of hybridization among cartilaginous fishes.

== Human interactions ==
Along with the spottail shark, the Australian blacktip shark is one of the most economically important sharks off northern Australia. It was historically fished for its meat and fins by a Taiwanese gillnet fishery, which began operating off northern Australia in 1974. The annual catch initially averaged around 25,000 tons (live weight), with approximately 70% consisting of Australian blacktip sharks, spottail sharks, and longtail tuna (Thunnus tonggol). Following the establishment of the Australian Fishing Zone (AFZ) in November 1979, the Australian government progressively excluded Taiwanese gillnet vessels from large portions of Australian waters and imposed fishing quotas. The fishery eventually became uneconomical when Australia restricted gillnet lengths to 2.5 km (1.6 mi) in May 1986, and Taiwanese vessels ceased fishing in Australian waters that year. At end of the fishery, Australian blacktip shark numbers were estimated to have been diminished by around 50%. Given its relatively high reproductive rate, its population has likely since recovered.

Since 1980, the Australian blacktip shark has also been targeted by Australian commercial gillnetters and longliners in the Northern Shark Fishery. It is additionally caught incidentally by other commercial fisheries targeting bony fishes or prawns. The contemporary northern Australian shark catch is estimated to be between 100 and 900 tons (live weight) annually, of which most are Australian blacktip and spottail sharks. The meat of this species is sold in Australia as "flake", though it may contain high concentrations of mercury. The fins are exported to Asia, while the cartilage, liver oil, and skin may also be used. Since fishing pressure on the Australian blacktip shark is now much lower than historical levels, the International Union for Conservation of Nature (IUCN) has listed it under Least Concern. However, of potential concern are Indonesian fishers in the Arafura Sea, who are increasingly trespassing into the AFZ.
