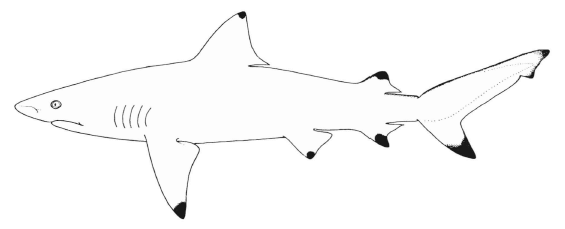

Conservation status
- Endangered (IUCN 3.1)

Scientific classification
- Kingdom: Animalia
- Phylum: Chordata
- Class: Chondrichthyes
- Subclass: Elasmobranchii
- Division: Selachii
- Order: Carcharhiniformes
- Family: Carcharhinidae
- Genus: Carcharhinus
- Species: C. leiodon

Binomial name
- Carcharhinus leiodon Garrick, 1985
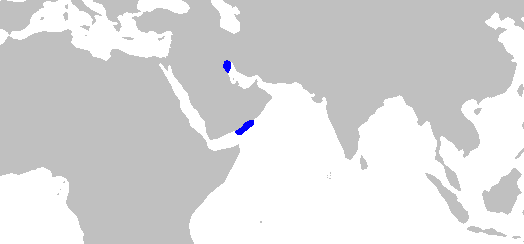
- Range of the smoothtooth blacktip shark

= Smoothtooth blacktip shark =

Species of shark

The smoothtooth blacktip shark (Carcharhinus leiodon) is a species of requiem shark in the family Carcharhinidae. It is known only from the type specimen caught from the Gulf of Aden, off eastern Yemen, and a handful of additional specimens caught from the Persian Gulf, off Kuwait. Reaching 1.3 m (4.3 ft) in length, this species has a stocky greenish-colored body, a short snout, and black-tipped fins. It can be distinguished from similar species by its teeth, which are narrow, erect, and smooth-edged.

Little is known of the smoothtooth blacktip shark's natural history; it likely inhabits shallow waters and feeds on small bony fishes. It is presumably viviparous like other members of its family. The International Union for Conservation of Nature last assessed this species as endangered. Although more specimens have since been discovered, the conservation status of this species remains precarious due to heavy fishing and habitat degradation within its range.

== Taxonomy and phylogeny ==
The first known specimen of the smoothtooth blacktip shark was a 75-cm-long, immature male caught by Wilhelm Hein in 1902 and deposited at the Naturhistorisches Museum in Vienna. The location was recorded as the Gulf of Aden near "Gischin", which likely refers to the town of Qishn in eastern Yemen. In 1985, the shark was examined and described as a new species by New Zealand ichthyologist Jack Garrick in a National Oceanic and Atmospheric Administration technical report. He gave it the specific epithet leiodon, from the Greek leios meaning "smooth", and odon meaning "tooth". This species was known only by the single specimen until 2008, when fishery surveys in Kuwait uncovered several more specimens.

Based on morphology, Leonard Compagno in 1988 tentatively grouped the smoothtooth blacktip shark with the spinner shark (C. brevipinna), the blacktip shark (C. limbatus), the graceful shark (C. amblyrhynchoides), and the finetooth shark (C. isodon). Using molecular phylogenetic techniques on mitochondrial DNA sequences, Alec Moore and colleagues reported in 2011 that this species is closely related to the graceful shark, the blacktip shark, and the Australian blacktip shark (C. tilstoni).

== Description ==
Superficially, the smoothtooth blacktip shark resembles the blacktip reef shark (C. melanopterus). It is rather robust in build, with a short and blunt snout. The large nostrils are preceded by well-developed, triangular flaps of skin. The small, circular eyes are equipped with nictitating membranes. The mouth forms a wide arch and has very short furrows at the corners. Sixteen upper and 14–15 lower tooth rows are on either side, along with two or three small teeth at the symphysis (center) of either jaw. The teeth are distinctive in shape, having narrow, upright cusps without serrations; finetooth sharks and juvenile spinner sharks are the only other members of Carcharhinus with similar teeth. The five pairs of gill slits are long.

The fairly long and pointed pectoral fins are slightly sickle-shaped (falcate) and originate between the fourth and fifth gill slits. The first dorsal fin is medium-sized and triangular with a pointed apex, and originates over the rear of the pectoral fin bases. The second dorsal fin is small and positioned opposite the anal fin. No ridge exists between the dorsal fins. The pelvic fins are triangular and larger than the anal fin, which has a deep notch in the trailing margin. A crescent-shaped notch is present on the caudal peduncle at the upper caudal fin origin. The caudal fin is asymmetrical, with a well-developed lower lobe and a longer upper lobe with a ventral notch near the tip. The dermal denticles are slightly overlapping and bear three prominent horizontal ridges leading to three or five marginal teeth. This species is greenish-yellow to greenish-gray above, sometimes with a scattering of tiny dark dots. The underside is white, which extends in a pale band onto the flanks. All the fins have sharply defined black tips, and a broad, dark midline stripe runs from the second dorsal fin base to the tip of the upper caudal fin lobe. The largest recorded specimen is 1.2 m (3.9 ft) long.

== Distribution and habitat ==
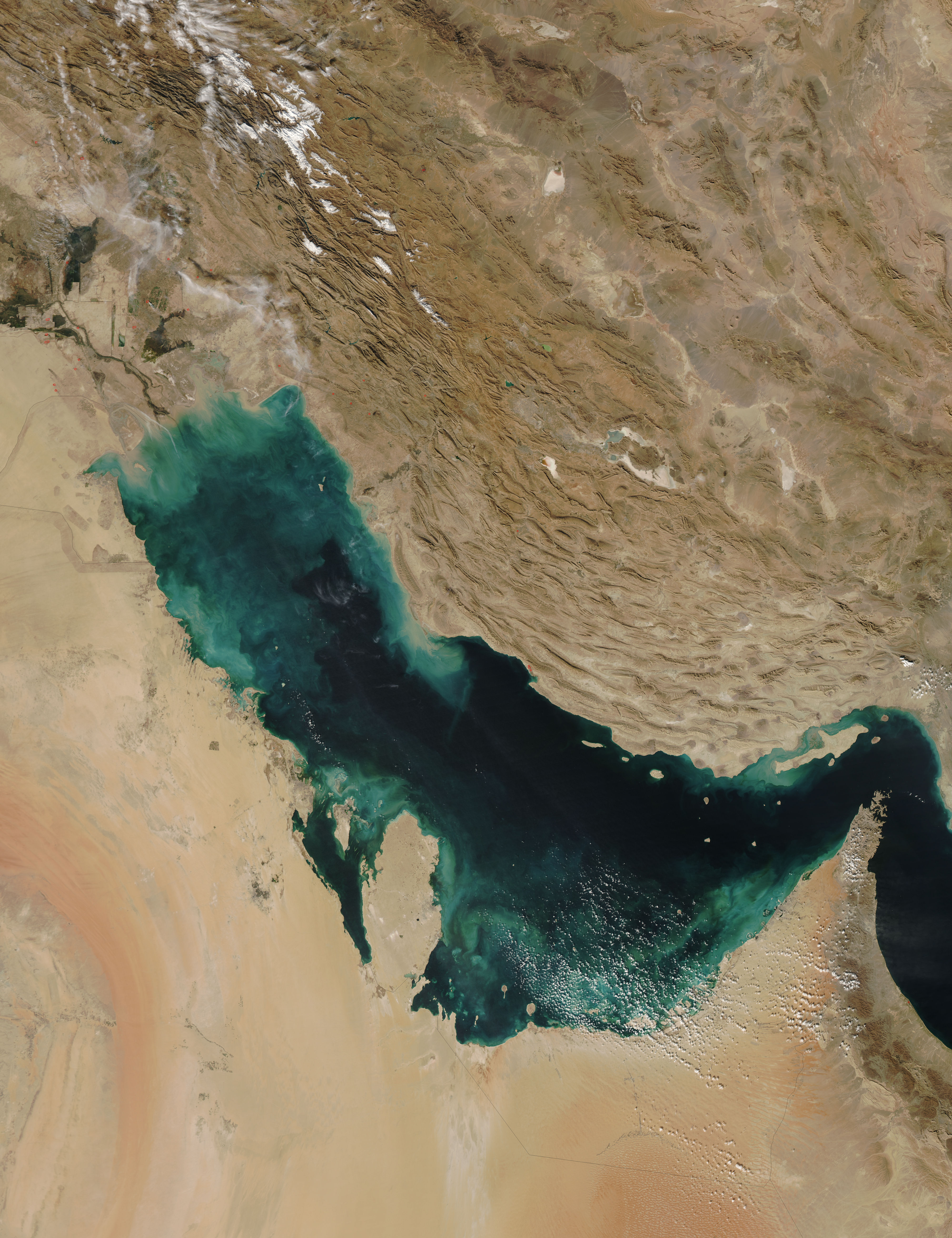
The northwestern Persian Gulf, home to a smoothtooth blacktip shark subpopulation, is a shallow, freshwater-influenced environment.

The smoothtooth blacktip shark has only been recorded from eastern Yemen and Kuwait, some 3,000 km (1,900 mi) apart. These two locations differ markedly: the Gulf of Aden near Yemen is over 2.5 km (1.6 mi) deep with a narrow continental shelf and no permanent riverine inputs, while the Persian Gulf near Kuwait is entirely shallower than 40 m (130 ft) and receives abundant fresh water from the Tigris-Euphrates-Karun river system. The Kuwait specimens were obtained from fish markets; given the practices of Kuwaiti speedboat fishers, this shark can be supposed to inhabit shallow, coastal waters. Still, these waters encompass a range of habitats from estuaries to coral reefs, thus the habitat requirements of the smoothtooth blacktip shark remain largely unknown.

== Biology and ecology ==
Considering its resemblance to the blacktip reef shark, the smoothtooth blacktip shark may play an equivalent shallow-water ecological role within its range. It is known to feed on marine catfish, and its diet probably also includes other small bony fishes. This species is presumably viviparous like all other Carcharhinus species, with the developing young sustained to term by a placental connection to the mother. Judging from the available specimens, males reach sexual maturity at some point between 0.9 and 1.2 m (3.0 and 3.9 ft) long.

== Human interactions ==
Prior to the finding of additional specimens in Kuwait, the International Union for Conservation of Nature assessed the smoothtooth blacktip shark as Endangered based on its presumed small range and population. Despite the discovery of a second subpopulation off Kuwait, this species likely still warrants an Endangered assessment because the waters around the Arabian Peninsula are subject to heavy fishing pressure and habitat degradation. Gillnet and other fisheries off Kuwait are known to take the smoothtooth blacktip shark as bycatch, while intensive Yemeni and Somalian shark fisheries operate in the Gulf of Aden. The status of the Yemen subpopulation is uncertain because no further specimens have been recorded since the original over a century ago.
