= Fish-liver oil =

Fish-liver oil may refer to:

- Cod liver oil, an oil extracted from cod livers
- Shark liver oil
