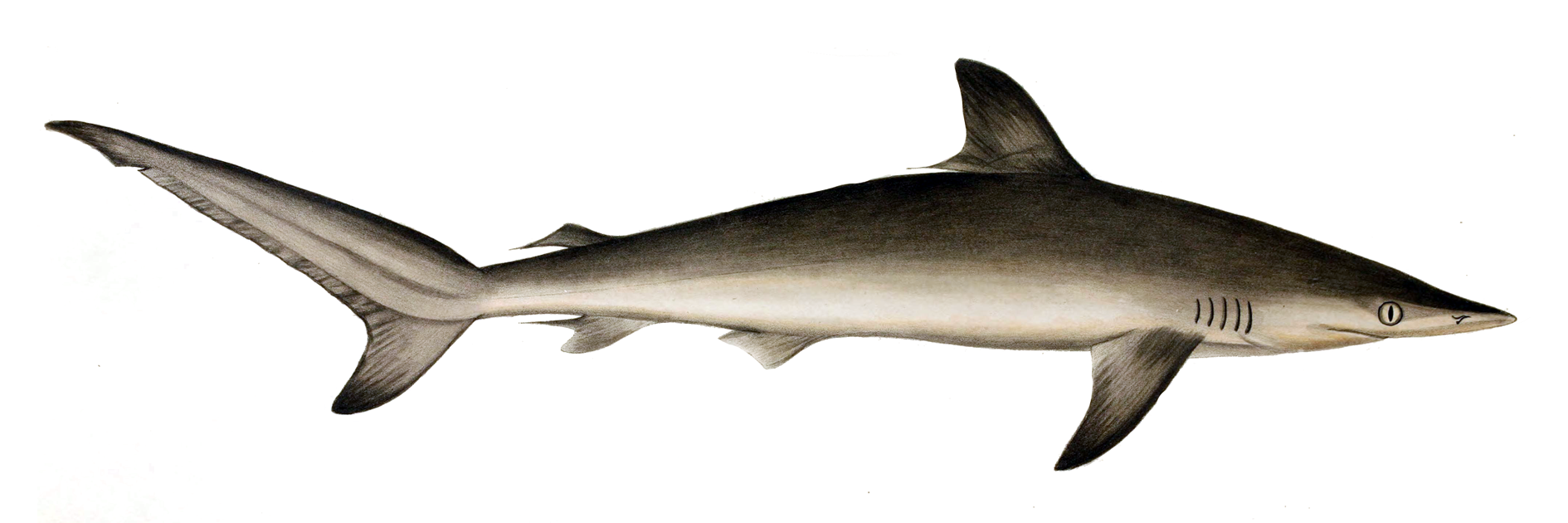

Conservation status
- Near Threatened (IUCN 3.1)

Scientific classification
- Kingdom: Animalia
- Phylum: Chordata
- Class: Chondrichthyes
- Subclass: Elasmobranchii
- Division: Selachii
- Order: Carcharhiniformes
- Family: Carcharhinidae
- Genus: Carcharhinus
- Species: C. sorrah

Binomial name
- Carcharhinus sorrah (J. P. Müller & Henle, 1839)
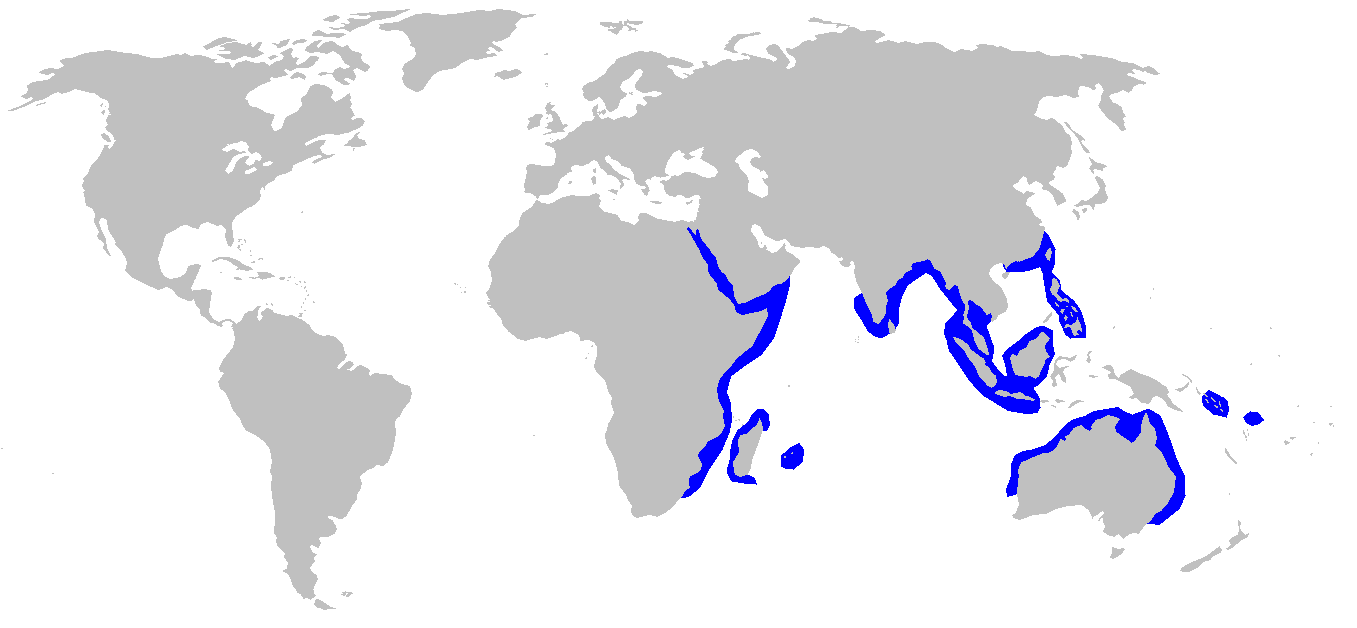
- Range of the spot-tail shark

Synonyms
- Carcharhinus bleekeri (Duméril, 1865); Carcharhinus spallanzani (Péron & Lesueur, 1822); Carcharias bleekeri Duméril, 1865; Carcharias sorrah Müller & Henle, 1839; Carcharias spallanzani (Péron & Lesueur, 1822); Carcharias taeniatus Hemprich & Ehrenberg, 1899; Carcharinus sorrah (Müller & Henle, 1839); Carcharius spallanzani (Péron & Lesueur, 1822); Eulamia spallanzani (Péron & Lesueur, 1822); Galeolamna isobel Whitley, 1947; Squalus spallanzani Péron & Lesueur, 1822

= Spot-tail shark =

Species of shark

The spot-tail shark, or sorrah shark (Carcharhinus sorrah), is a species of requiem shark, in the family Carcharhinidae, found in the tropical Indo-West Pacific Ocean between latitudes 31°N and 31°S from the surface to a depth around 72 m (236 ft). This shark grows to about 1.6 m (5 ft 3 in). It is fished commercially over much of its range and the IUCN considers it to be near threatened.

== Etymology ==
The species name sorrah originates from சுறா ("sura"), the Tamil word for "shark".

== Description ==
The spot-tail shark is a spindle-shaped fish growing to about 1.6 m (5 ft 3 in). It has a fairly long, pointed snout and moderately large eyes. The first dorsal fin is large and curved, while the second dorsal fin is small and low. The back and sides are grey and the belly white, and a long white streak is on the flank. This species can be distinguished from other requiem sharks found in tropical waters by the distinctive black tips to the second dorsal fin, the pectoral fins, and the lower lobe of the caudal fin. A ridge over the spine extends from the first to the second dorsal fin and a pit just in front of the upper lobe of the caudal fin. The upper teeth are serrated, oblique, and triangular. The Australian blacktip shark (C. tilstoni), which occupies a similar range, has similar black tips to the fins, but additionally has a black tip to its first dorsal fin. It lacks the ridge between the two dorsal fins and its upper teeth are also different, being slender, upright, and pointed.

== Distribution ==
The spot-tail shark is found in the tropical Indo-Pacific on continental and insular shelves commonly to a depth around 73 m (240 ft), but possibly as deep as 140 metres (460 ft). Its range extends from the East African coast, Madagascar, and the Red Sea to India, Malaysia, China, the Philippines, and northern Australia.

== Biology ==
The spot-tail shark spends the day near the seabed and the night at the surface, most frequently around reefs. It is a predator and feeds on bony fish such as bonito and sea bass, cephalopods, and crustaceans.

The spot-tail shark is viviparous with a yolk-sac placenta, giving birth once a year to a litter of one to eight live young. The gestation period is 10 months and the pups measure about 50 cm (20 in) at birth. The young develop in shallow inshore waters. They grow rapidly at first, increasing in length by about 20 cm (8 in) during their first year, but growth slows down thereafter. Females reach sexual maturity at two to three years and live for a maximum of seven years, while males live up to five years.

== Status ==
The spot-tail shark is caught by line and gillnet in many parts of its range by small-scale commercial fisheries. The flesh is used for food, the liver for vitamins, the fins for shark fin soup, and the offal for fish meal. The IUCN has listed this shark as being near threatened, as it suffers from overfishing throughout much of its range and many populations seem to be in decline. The fisheries in northern Australia are relatively well managed.
