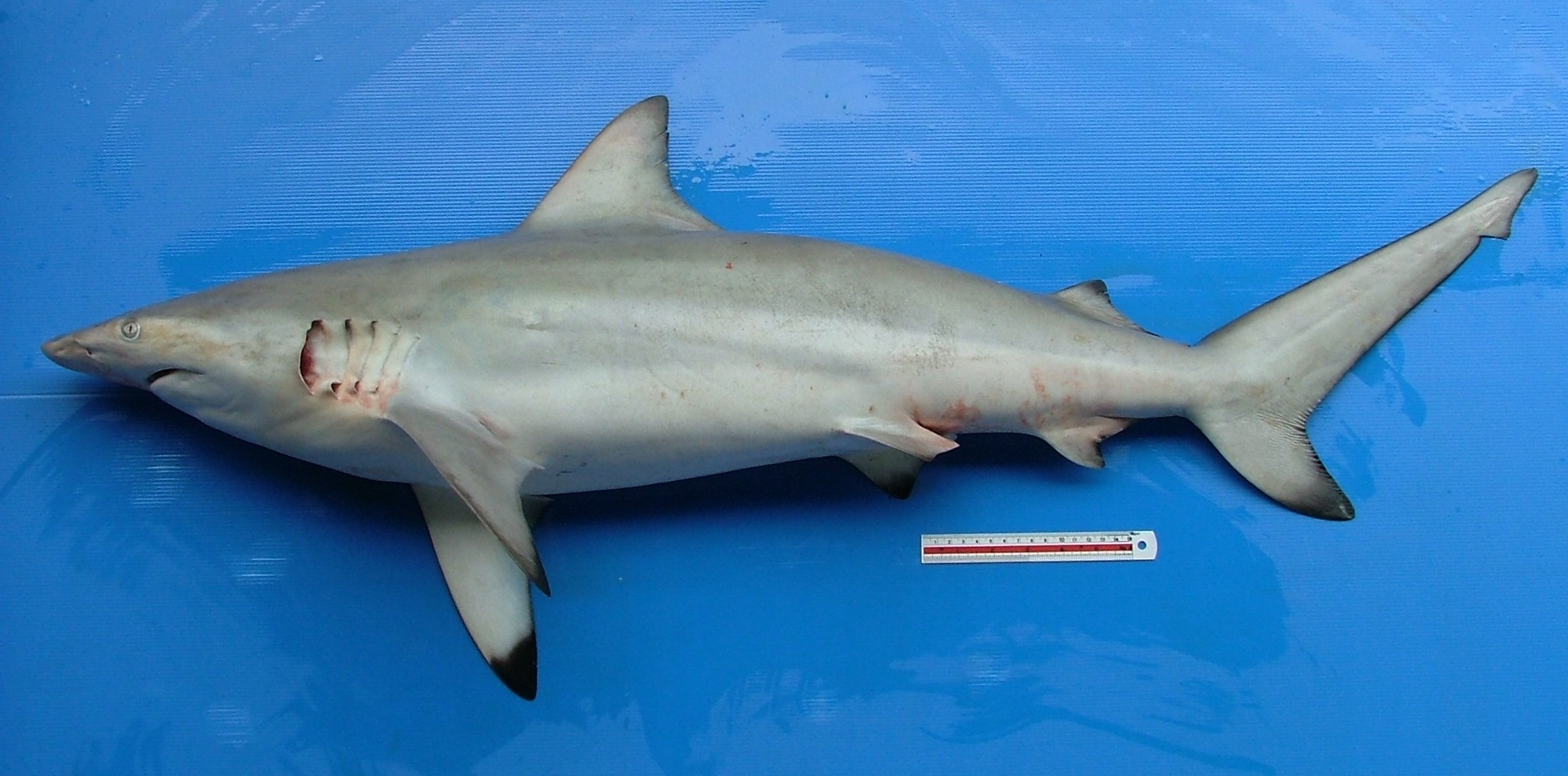

Conservation status
- Vulnerable (IUCN 3.1)

Scientific classification
- Kingdom: Animalia
- Phylum: Chordata
- Class: Chondrichthyes
- Subclass: Elasmobranchii
- Division: Selachii
- Order: Carcharhiniformes
- Family: Carcharhinidae
- Genus: Carcharhinus
- Species: C. amblyrhynchoides

Binomial name
- Carcharhinus amblyrhynchoides (Whitley, 1934)
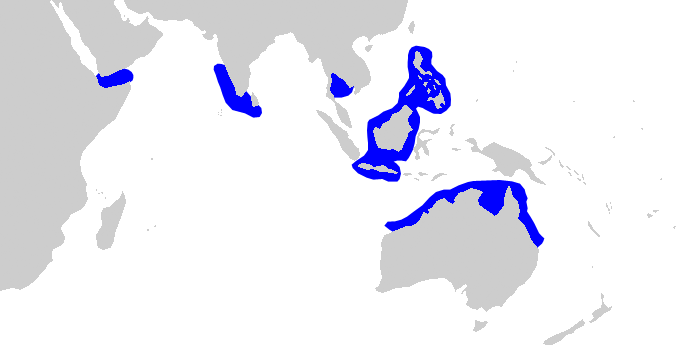
- Range of the graceful shark

Synonyms
- Carcharias pleurotaenia Bleeker, 1952; Gillisqualus amblyrhynchoides Whitley, 1934

= Graceful shark =

Graceful shark Temporal range: Late Miocene to present

Species of shark

The graceful shark or Queensland shark (Carcharhinus amblyrhynchoides) is a species of requiem shark, in the family Carcharhinidae, found in the tropical Indo-Pacific, from the Gulf of Aden to northern Australia. It is a midwater species that has been recorded to a depth of 50 m (160 ft). A stoutly built shark growing up to 1.7 m (5.6 ft) long, the graceful shark has a short, wedge-shaped snout, large, sickle-shaped pectoral fins and first dorsal fin, and black tips on most fins.

Graceful sharks prey mainly on bony fishes, and to a much lesser extent on cephalopods and crustaceans. It is viviparous, with females bearing litters of up to 9 pups following a 9- to 10-month gestation period. Off northern Australia, birthing occurs in January and February, with mating shortly after. This species is potentially dangerous, but has not been implicated in any attacks. It is caught incidentally by commercial fisheries throughout its range for meat, fins, and liver oil, though specific information is lacking. The International Union for Conservation of Nature has listed it under Near Threatened.

== Taxonomy and phylogeny ==
Australian ichthyologist Gilbert Percy Whitley originally described the graceful shark as Gillisqualus amblyrhynchoides, in a 1934 issue of Memoirs of the Queensland Museum. He based his account on a 60-cm-long immature female caught off Cape Bowling Green in Queensland, hence the alternate common name Queensland shark. Later authors have synonymised Gillisqualus with Carcharhinus.

As with most Carcharhinus species, the evolutionary relationships of the graceful shark are poorly resolved. Based on morphology, Jack Garrick concluded in 1982 that its closest relative was the blacktip shark (C. limbatus), and that the two were closely related to the spinner shark (C. brevipinna). Leonard Compagno, in his 1988 phenetic study, also grouped those species together, along with the smoothtooth blacktip shark (C. leiodon) and the finetooth shark (C. isodon). However, molecular phylogenetic techniques have since found this interpretation to be invalid for the spinner, blacktip, and finetooth sharks.

Fossil teeth of the graceful shark are known from the Late Miocene of Brunei, representing the oldest known record of the species.

== Distribution and habitat ==
The graceful shark is distributed widely in the tropical Indo-Pacific, having been reported from the Gulf of Aden, southwestern India and Sri Lanka, the Gulf of Thailand, Vietnam, the Philippines to Borneo and Java, and Papua New Guinea to northern Australia from Townsville to Eighty Mile Beach. Given its rarity and the difficulty in distinguishing it from related species, its range is probably continuous and wider than the present patchy records suggest. The graceful shark is an open-water inhabitant that can be found from close to shore to the outer continental and insular shelves, diving at least 50 m (160 ft).

== Description ==
Contrary to its common name, the graceful shark's spindle-shaped body has been described as "tubby". The wedge-like snout is short and pointed. The eyes are rather large and circular, and equipped with nictitating membranes (protective third eyelids). The mouth has short, indistinct furrows at the corners and contains 31–33 upper and 29–33 lower tooth rows. The upper teeth have a single narrow cusp with serrated edges, upright at the center of the jaw and becoming more oblique on the sides. The lower teeth are similar to the upper teeth, but more upright and slender. The five pairs of gill slits are fairly long.

The pectoral fins are falcate (sickle-shaped) and taper to pointed tips; their leading margins measure about a fifth as long as the total length in sharks over 80 cm (31 in) long. The first dorsal fin is high and broad, with a pointed apex and a concave trailing margin; its origin lies roughly over the insertion (the rear of the fin base) of the pectoral fins. The second dorsal fin is relatively large and located about opposite the anal fin, which is about of equal size. There is no ridge between the dorsal fins. The caudal fin has a well-developed lower lobe and a ventral notch near the tip of the upper lobe. This species is bronze above and white below, which extends onto the flanks as a pale stripe. The pectoral fins, dorsal fins, lower caudal fin lobe, and sometimes the pelvic fins usually have black tips, while the upper caudal fin lobe darkens towards the trailing edge and the anal fin may be completely light. The fin markings tend to fade with age. The maximum known length is 1.7 m (5.6 ft).

== Biology and ecology ==
The graceful shark feeds predominantly on bony fishes, with cephalopods and crustaceans being of minor importance. Jacks make up over 60% of its fish diet in the Gulf of Carpentaria. Like other members of its family, this species is viviparous: once the developing embryos exhaust their supply of yolk, the depleted yolk sac is converted into a placental connection to the mother. Off northern Australia, males and females likely mate every year in February, with ovulation following shortly after. Females typically bear litters of three, though individuals gestating up to 9 pups have been reported. The young are born in January or February, following a gestation period of 9–10 months. Sexual maturity is attained at a length of 1.1–1.2 m (3.6–3.9 ft) for both sexes. A known parasite of this species is a tapeworm in the genus Cathetocephalus.

== Human interactions ==
Given its size, the graceful shark is potentially dangerous to humans, though no attacks have been recorded. It is caught incidentally by commercial fisheries in Thailand, India, Sri Lanka, and probably elsewhere, using gillnets and longlines. It is a minor component of shark catches off northern Australia, comprising around 1.5% and 0.2% of all sharks caught in gillnets and on longlines, respectively, in the mid-1980s. Catches in the region have declined from historical highs in the 1970s and 1980s due to the departure of foreign fishing vessels following new gillnet regulations. The meat is sold fresh or dried and salted, the fins are shipped to East Asia for shark fin soup, and the liver is processed for vitamins. The International Union for Conservation of Nature has assessed this species as Near Threatened, noting more biological and fishery information is needed.
