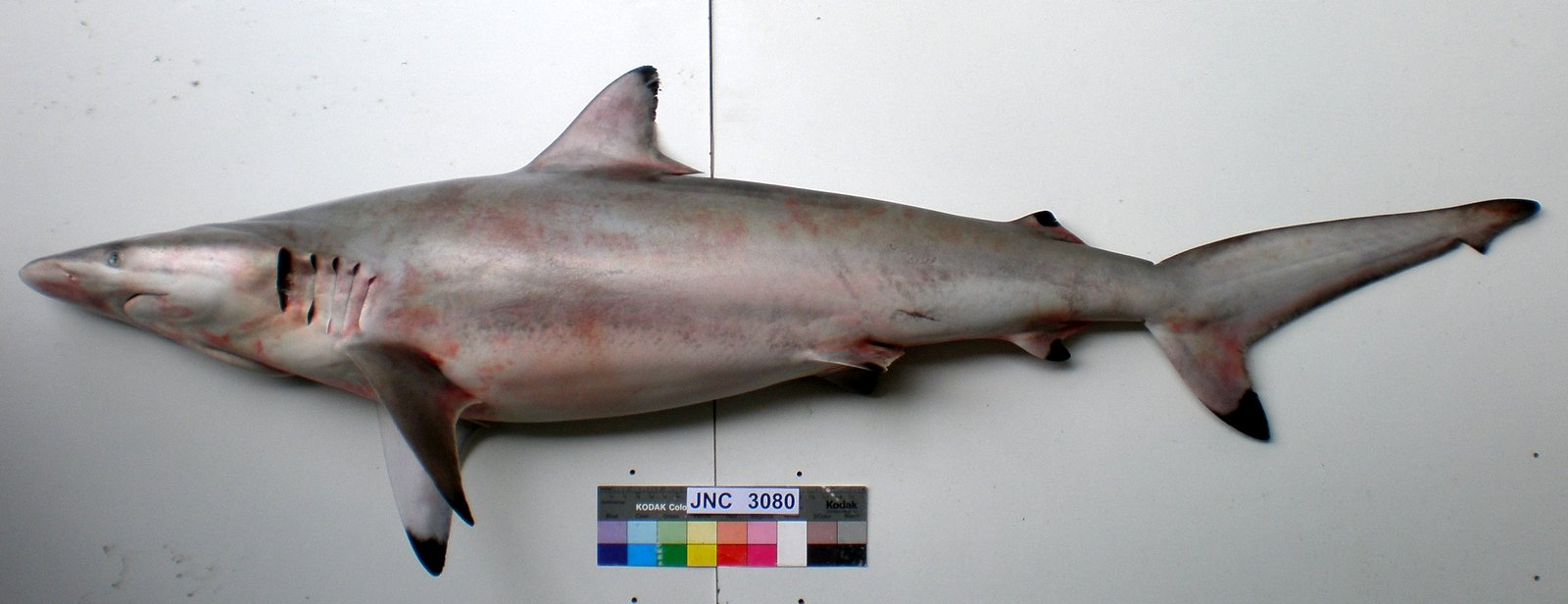

Conservation status
- Vulnerable (IUCN 3.1)

Scientific classification
- Kingdom: Animalia
- Phylum: Chordata
- Class: Chondrichthyes
- Subclass: Elasmobranchii
- Division: Selachii
- Order: Carcharhiniformes
- Family: Carcharhinidae
- Genus: Carcharhinus
- Species: C. brevipinna

Binomial name
- Carcharhinus brevipinna (J. P. Müller & Henle, 1839)
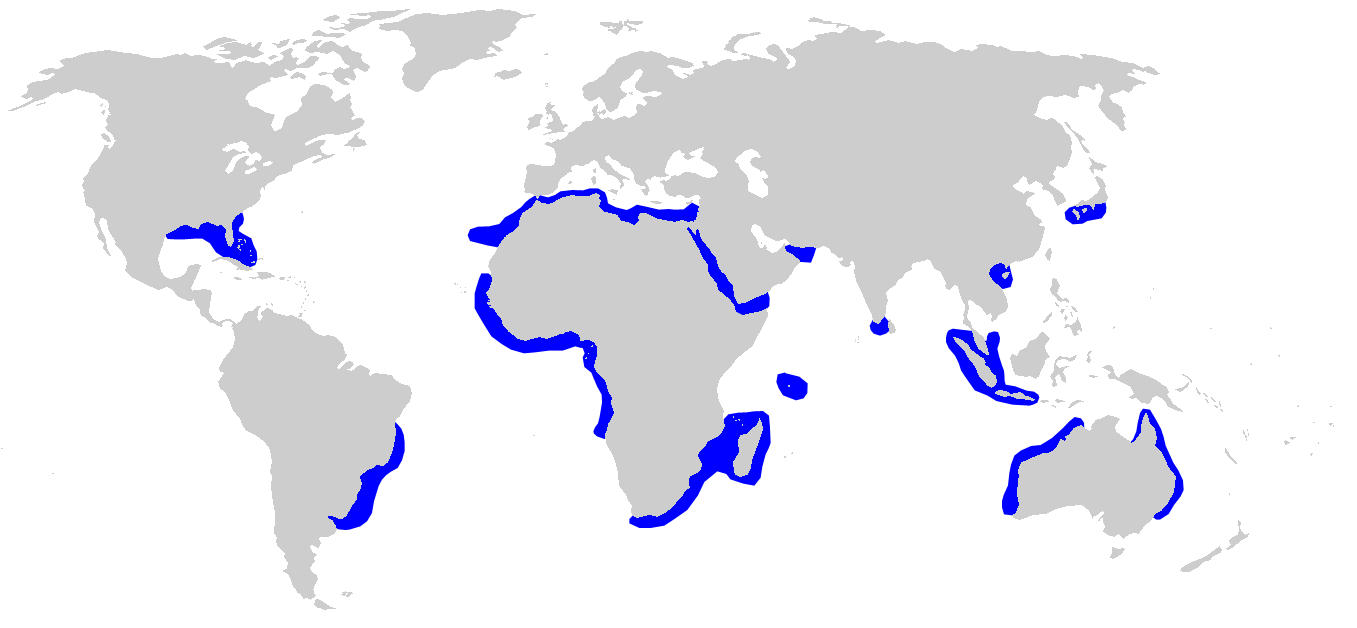
- Range of the spinner shark

Synonyms
- Aprionodon caparti Poll, 1951; Carcharhinus johnsoni Smith, 1951; Carcharias brevipinna Müller & Henle, 1839; Isogomphodon maculipinnis Poey, 1865; Longmania calamaria Whitley, 1944; Uranga nasuta Whitley, 1943

= Spinner shark =

Spinner shark Temporal range: Late Miocene to present

Species of shark

The spinner shark (Carcharhinus brevipinna) is a type of requiem shark, in the family Carcharhinidae, named for the spinning leaps it makes as a part of its feeding strategy. This species occurs in tropical and warm temperate waters worldwide, except for in the eastern Pacific Ocean. It is found from coastal to offshore habitats to a depth of 100 m (330 ft), though it prefers shallow water. The spinner shark resembles a larger version of the blacktip shark (C. limbatus), with a slender body, long snout, and black-marked fins. This species can be distinguished from the blacktip shark by the first dorsal fin, which has a different shape and is placed further back, and by the black tip on the anal fin (in adults only). It attains a maximum length of 3 m (9.8 ft).

Spinner sharks are swift and gregarious predators that feed on a wide variety of small bony fishes and cephalopods. When feeding on schools of forage fish, they speed vertically through the school while spinning on their axis, erupting from the water at the end. Like other members of its family, the spinner shark is viviparous, with females bearing litters of three to 20 young every other year. The young are born in shallow nursery areas near the coast, and are relatively fast-growing. This species is not usually dangerous to humans, but may become belligerent when excited by food. Spinner sharks are valued by commercial fisheries across their range for their meat, fins, liver oil, and skin. They are also esteemed as strong fighters by recreational fishers. The International Union for Conservation of Nature has assessed this species as Vulnerable worldwide.

== Taxonomy and phylogeny ==
The spinner shark was originally described as Carcharias (Aprion) brevipinna by Johannes Peter Müller and Friedrich Gustav Jakob Henle in their 1839 Systematische Beschreibung der Plagiostomen, based on the mounted skin of a 79-cm-long specimen collected off Java. This species was subsequently moved to the genera Aprion, Squalus, and Aprionodon before being placed within the genus Carcharhinus. The tooth shape and coloration of this species varies significantly with age and between geographical regions, which caused much taxonomic confusion. Other common names include black-tipped shark, great blacktip shark, inkytail shark, large blacktip shark, long-nose grey shark, longnose grey whaler, and smoothfang shark.

Based on similarities in morphology, tooth shape, and behavior, the closest relatives of the spinner shark were originally believed to be the blacktip shark and the graceful shark (C. amblyrhynchoides). However, this interpretation was not supported by Gavin Naylor's 1992 allozyme analysis, which suggested that these similarities are the product of convergent evolution and that the closest relative of the spinner shark is the copper shark (C. brachyurus). In a 2007 ribosomal DNA study, the spinner shark was found to be the most genetically divergent of all the requiem shark species examined save for the tiger shark (Galeocerdo cuvier), being less related to other Carcharhinus species than the lemon shark (Negaprion brevirostris).

The earliest fossil record of the spinner shark is from the Late Miocene of Panama. They are also known from the Late Miocene of Odisha, India and potentially the mid-Miocene to Early Pliocene of Florida, US.

== Distribution and habitat ==
Some uncertainty exists in the distribution data for the spinner shark due to confusion with the blacktip shark. In the Western Atlantic Ocean, it occurs from North Carolina to the northern Gulf of Mexico, including the Bahamas and Cuba, and from southern Brazil to Argentina. In the Eastern Atlantic, it occurs from off North Africa to Namibia. In the Indian Ocean, it is found from South Africa and Madagascar, to the Red Sea and the Gulf of Aden, to India and nearby islands, to Java and Sumatra. In the Pacific Ocean, it occurs off Japan, Vietnam, Australia, and possibly the Philippines. Parasitological evidence suggests that Indian Ocean spinner sharks have passed through the Suez Canal into the Mediterranean Sea, becoming Lessepsian migrants.

The spinner shark has been reported from the ocean surface to a depth of 100 m (330 ft), though it prefers water less than 30 m (98 ft) deep, and occupies all levels of the water column. This species may be found from coastal waters to well offshore, over continental and insular shelves. Juveniles have been known to enter bays, but avoid brackish conditions. The northwest Atlantic subpopulation is known to be migratory; in spring and summer, they are found in warm inshore waters, and in winter, they move south into deeper water.

== Description ==
The average spinner shark is 2 m (6.6 ft) long and weighs 56 kg (123 lb); this species attains a maximum known length and weight of 3 m (9.8 ft) and 90 kg (200 lb). Indo-Pacific sharks are generally larger than those from the northwest Atlantic. This species has a slim, streamlined body with a distinctive, long, pointed snout. The eyes are small and circular. Prominent, forward-pointing furrows occur at the corners of the mouth. The tooth rows number 15–18 in each half of the upper jaw and 14–17 in each half of the lower jaw, with two and one tiny symphysial (central) teeth, respectively. The teeth have long, narrow central cusps and are finely serrated in the upper jaw and smooth in the lower jaw. The five pairs of gill slits are long.

The first dorsal fin is relatively small and usually originates behind the free rear tip of the pectoral fins. No ridge exists between the first and second dorsal fins. The pectoral fins are moderately short, narrow, and falcate (sickle-shaped). The body is densely covered with diamond-shaped dermal denticles with seven (rarely five) shallow horizontal ridges. The coloration is gray above, sometimes with a bronze sheen, and white below, with a faint white band on the sides. Young individuals have unmarked fins; the tips of the second dorsal fin, pectoral fins, anal fin, and lower caudal fin lobe (and sometimes the other fins, as well) are black in larger individuals. The spinner shark differs from the blacktip shark in that its first dorsal fin is slightly more triangular in shape and is placed further back on the body. Adults can also be distinguished by the black tip on the anal fin.

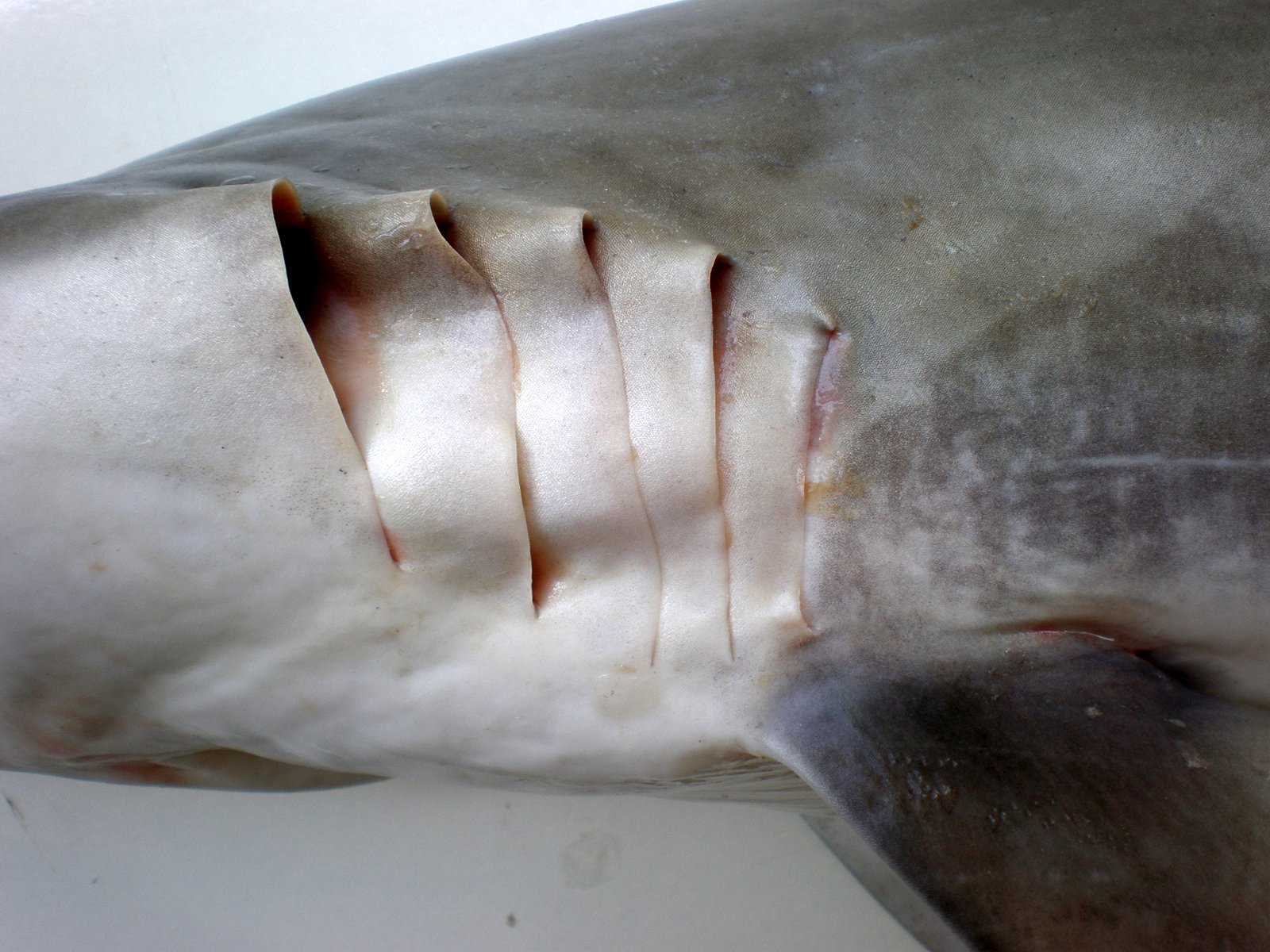
Gill slits

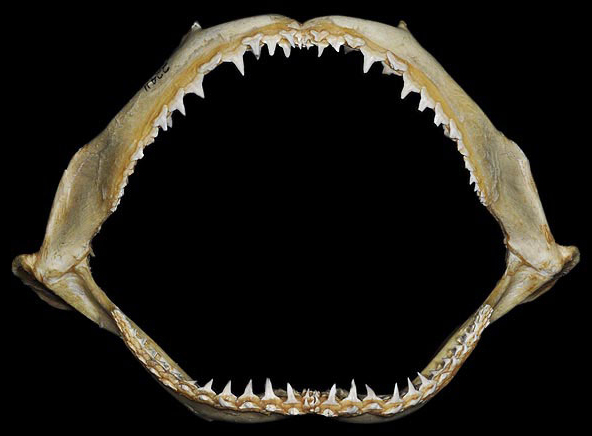
Jaws

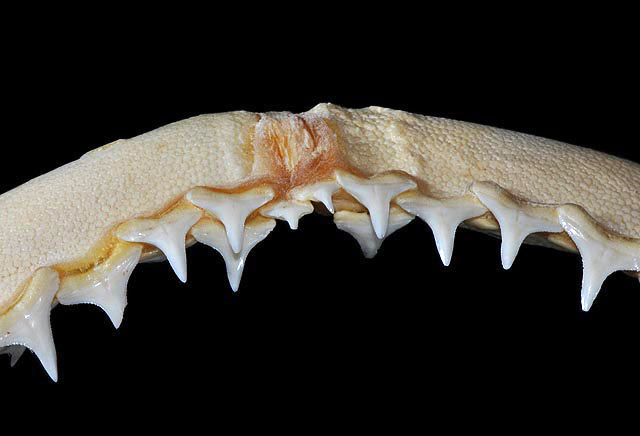
Upper teeth

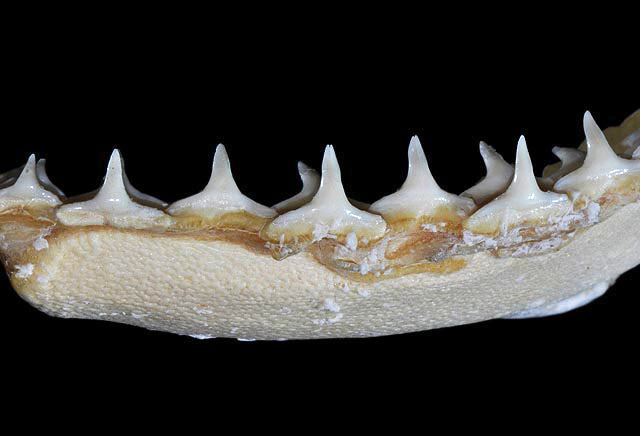
Lower teeth

== Biology and ecology ==
The spinner shark is a fast, active swimmer that sometimes forms large schools, segregated by age and sex. Young individuals prefer cooler water temperatures than adults. Off South Africa, females are found close to shore year-round, while males only appear during the summer. Smaller spinner sharks may be preyed upon by larger sharks. Known parasites of the spinner shark include the copepods Kroyeria deetsi, Nemesis pilosus, and N. atlantica, which infest the shark's gills, Alebion carchariae, which infests the skin, Nesippus orientalis, which infests the mouth and gill arches, and Perissopus dentatus, which infests the nares and the rear margins of the fins.

=== Feeding ===
Spinner sharks feed primarily on small bony fish, including tenpounders, sardines, herring, anchovies, sea catfish, lizardfish, mullets, bluefish, tunas, bonito, croakers, jacks, mojarras, grunts, and tongue-soles. They have also been known to eat stingrays, cuttlefish, squid, and octopus. Groups of spinner sharks are often found pursuing schools of prey at high speed. Individual prey are seized and swallowed whole, as this shark lacks cutting dentition. This species employs an unusual tactic when feeding on schools of small fish; the shark charges vertically through the school, spinning on its axis with its mouth open and snapping all around it. The shark's momentum at the end of these spiraling runs often carries it into the air, giving it its common name. The blacktip shark also performs this behavior, though not as often. Off Madagascar, spinner sharks follow migrating schools of mackerel, tunas, and jacks. Like blacktip sharks, they congregate around shrimp trawlers to feed on the discarded bycatch, and may be incited into feeding frenzies.

=== Life history ===
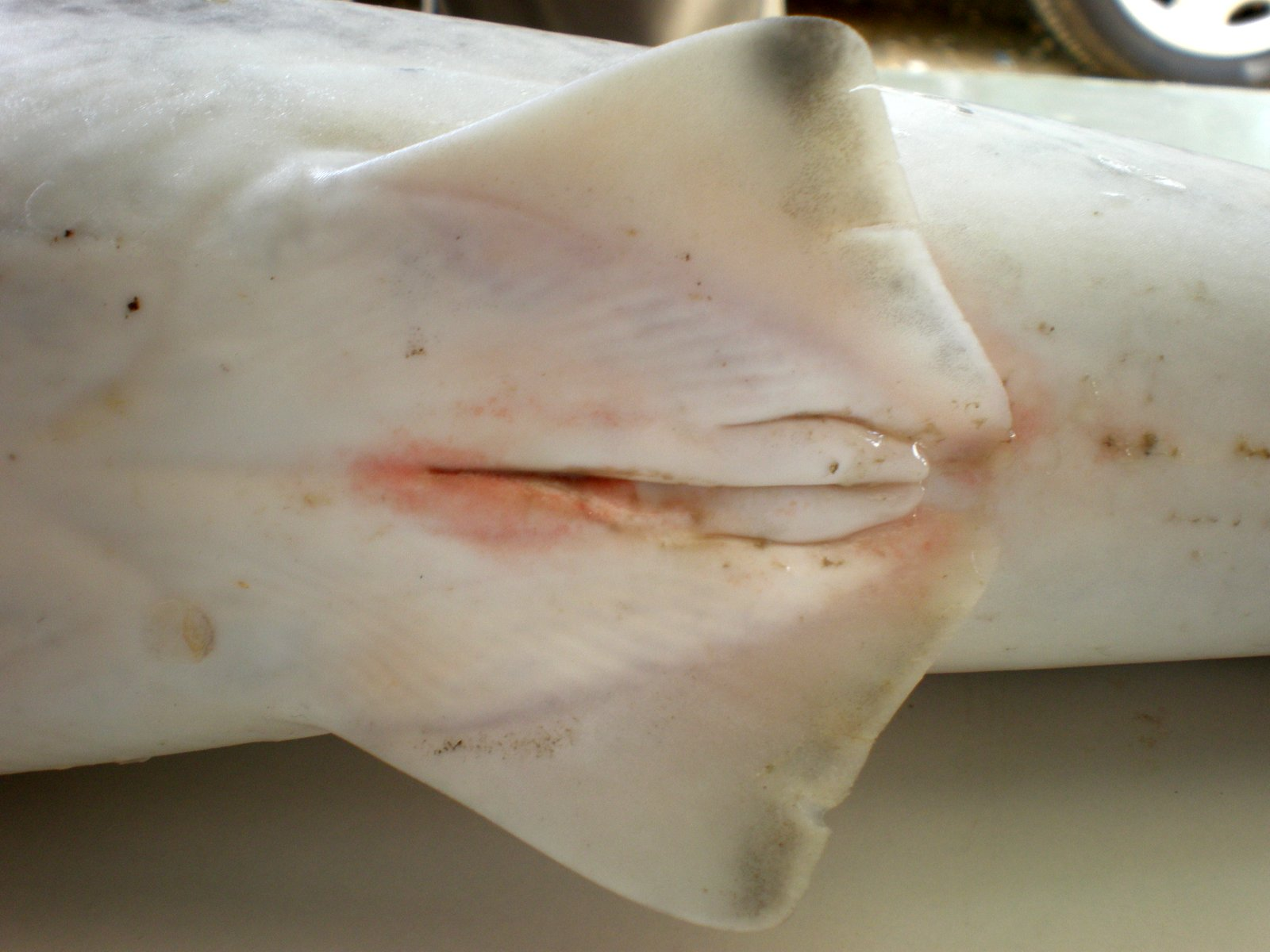
Claspers (external male copulatory parts) of a young Carcharhinus brevipinna

Like other requiem sharks, the spinner shark is viviparous. Adult females have a single functional ovary and two functional uteri; each uterus is divided into compartments, one for each embryo. The embryos are initially sustained by a yolk sac. When the embryo grows to around 19 cm (7.5 in) long, the supply of yolk has been exhausted and the empty yolk sac develops into a placental connection through which the mother provides nutrients for the remainder of gestation. This species has the smallest ova relative to the fully developed embryo of any viviparous shark known. Females give birth to three to 20 (usually seven to 11) pups every other year, after a gestation period of 11–15 months. Mating occurs from early spring to summer, and parturition in August off North Africa, from April to May off South Africa, and from March to April in the northwestern Atlantic. Young are birthed in coastal nursery areas such as bays, beaches, and high-salinity estuaries in water deeper than 5 m (16 ft).

The length at birth is 66–77 cm (26–30 in) in the northwestern Atlantic, 61–69 cm (24–27 in) off Tunisia, and 60 cm (24 in) off South Africa. Spinner sharks are relatively fast-growing sharks: 30 cm (12 in) per year for newborns, 25 cm (9.8 in) per year for one-year-olds, 10 cm (3.9 in) per year for adolescents, and 5 cm (2.0 in) per year for adults. In the northwestern Atlantic, males mature at 1.3 m (4.3 ft) long and females at 1.5–1.6 m (4.9–5.2 ft) long, corresponding to ages of 4–5 years and 7–8 years, respectively. Off South Africa, males mature at 1.8 m (5.9 ft) and females at 2.1 m (6.9 ft). Spinner sharks generally do not reproduce until they are 12–14 years old. The maximum lifespan has been estimated at 15–20 years or more.

== Human interactions ==
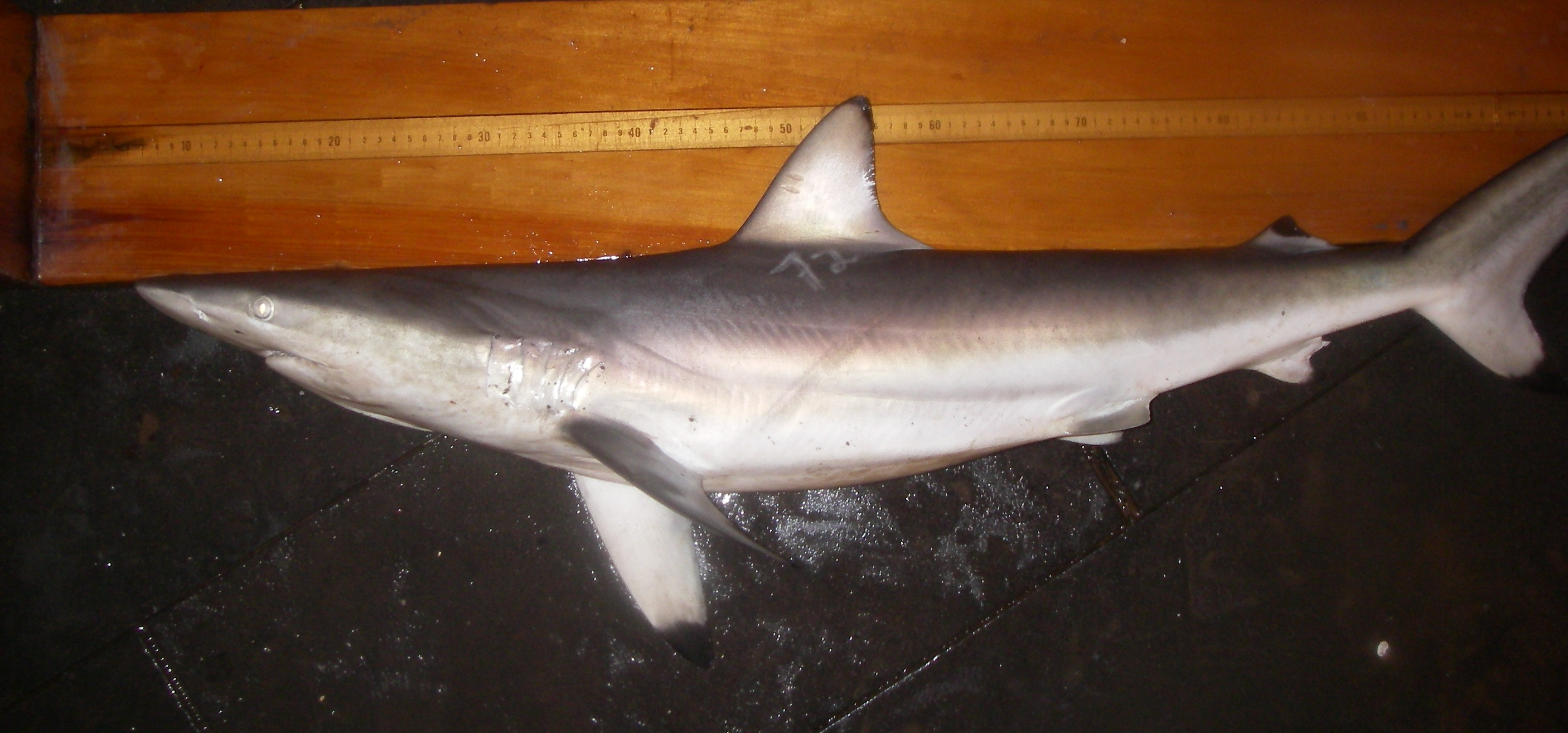
The spinner shark is valued by both commercial and recreational fisheries.

Ordinarily, spinner sharks do not pose a substantial danger to humans; they do not perceive large mammals as prey, as their small, narrow teeth are adapted for grasping rather than cutting. However, they can become excited by the presence of food, so caution is warranted if this species is encountered while spearfishing. As of 2008, the International Shark Attack File listed 16 unprovoked attacks and one provoked attack attributable to the spinner shark, none of them fatal.

The meat of the spinner shark is of high quality and sold fresh or dried and salted. In addition, the fins are used for shark fin soup in East Asia, the liver oil is processed for vitamins, and the skin is made into leather products. Spinner sharks are an important catch of the US commercial shark fisheries operating in the northwestern Atlantic and the Gulf of Mexico. The meat is marketed under the name "blacktip shark" in the United States, due to that species being considered superior in quality by consumers. It is likely also caught by other fisheries across its range, going unreported owing to confusion with the blacktip shark. The spinner shark is also highly regarded by recreational fishers, being described as a "spectacular fighter" that often leaps out of the water.

The IUCN has assessed the spinner shark as Vulnerable worldwide; its frequent use of coastal habitats renders it vulnerable to human exploitation and habitat degradation. The Northwest Atlantic fishery for this species is managed under the US National Marine Fisheries Service 1999 Fishery Management Plan for Atlantic Tunas, Swordfish, and Sharks. For the purposes of commercial quotas and recreational bag limits, the spinner shark is categorized as a "large coastal shark".
