= Shark liver oil =

Oil obtained from the livers of sharks

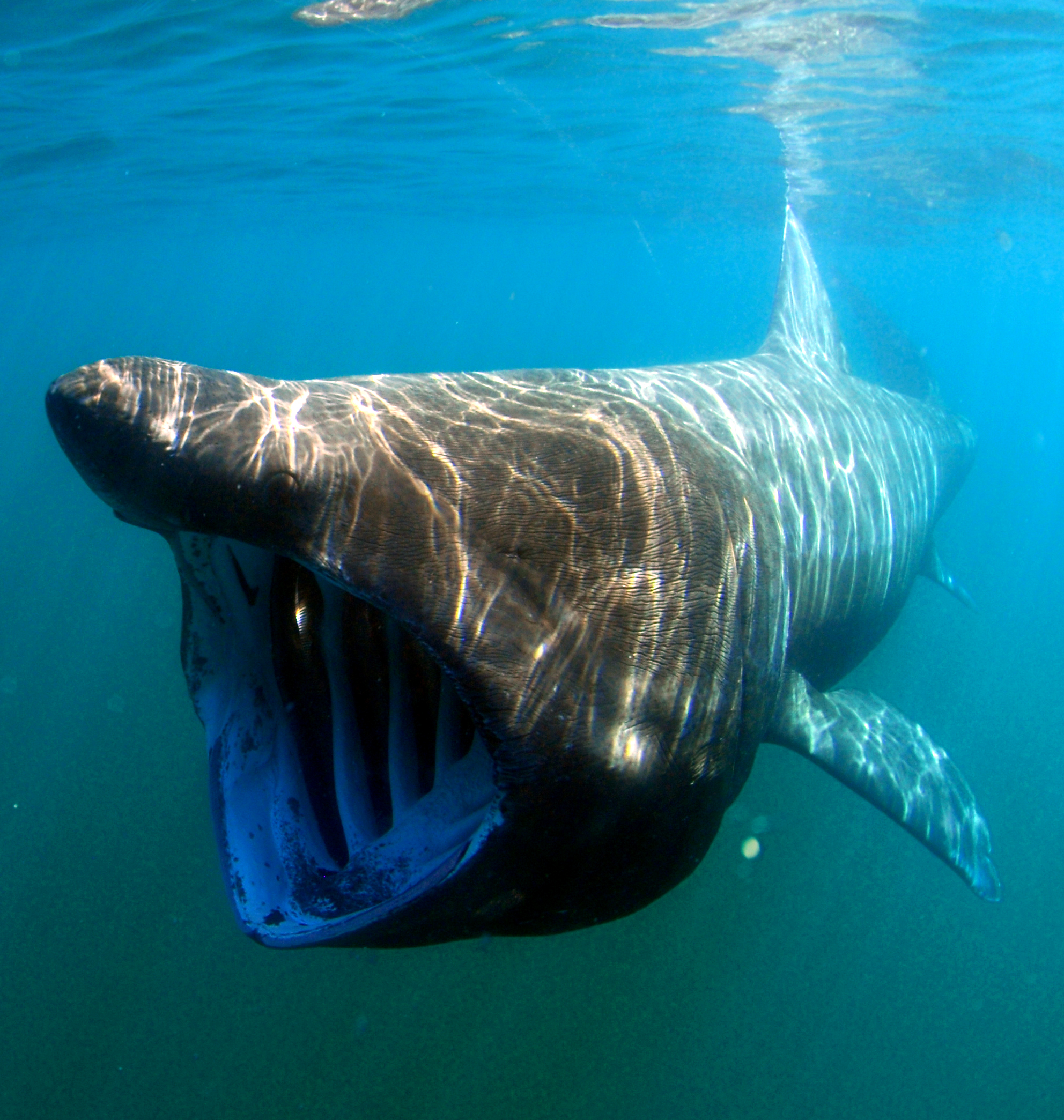
Sharks typically targeted for their liver oil include the school and gulper shark, and the basking shark (pictured). All three of these species are either endangered or critically endangered due to overfishing according to the IUCN, although a legal targeted fishery for basking sharks no longer exists.

Shark liver oil is an oil obtained from the livers of sharks. It has been used for centuries as a folk remedy to promote the healing of wounds and as a remedy for respiratory tract and digestive system problems. It is still promoted as a dietary supplement, and additional claims have been made that it can treat other maladies such as cancer, HIV, radiation sickness, swine flu, and the common cold. To date, none of these claims has been medically validated and shark liver oil (alone) is not a medication prescribed or utilized by American physicians. However, it is a component of some moisturizing skin lotions and hemorrhoid medications.

== Function in the shark ==
Many fish maintain buoyancy with swim bladders. However sharks lack swim bladders, and maintain their buoyancy instead with large livers that are full of oil. This stored oil may also function as a nutrient when food is scarce. Deep sea sharks are usually targeted for their oil, because the livers of these species can account for up to 5–10% of their total weight.

== Composition ==
A principal component of many shark oils is squalene, a triterpenoid (C_{30}H_{50}), ranging up to 90% of the oil, depending on the species. In Centrophorus species squalene may account for 15% of the total body weight. Pristane, another terpenoid (C_{19}H_{40}), is often a minor component, ranging up to nearly 8% of the oil.

== Medicinal use ==
Most shark liver oil supplements have not been tested to find out if they interact with medicines, foods, or other herbs and supplements. Even though some reports of interactions and harmful effects may be published, full studies of interactions and effects are not often available. Although many people have taken shark liver oil, the issue of potential toxicity at the usual doses has not been well studied. Some mild digestive problems such as nausea, upset stomach, and diarrhea have been reported. The safe range of doses for shark liver oil has not yet been determined, though overdosing can have toxic consequences.

Some animal studies have found that shark liver oil and its components may raise blood cholesterol levels. A Japanese study found some shark liver oil supplements to be contaminated with polychlorinated biphenyls (PCBs) and polybrominated diphenyl ethers (PBDEs). PCBs can have harmful effects in humans, and may increase the risk of some types of cancer. People with seafood allergies may also react to shark liver oil.

Shark liver oil has been misleadingly promoted as a treatment for cancer. In addition, it has been confused with the word "Charcoal" in multiple translations. Despite claims that the alkoxy-glycerols derived from shark liver oil could reduce tumor growth, there is not sufficient evidence to prove this to be a viable treatment option.

== Shark oil barometers ==
Traditionally, the people of Bermuda rely on shark-oil based "barometers" to predict storms and other severe weather. Small bottles of oil are hung outside. If the bottle is clear then the weather will be good, while, if it is cloudy, it is advisable to take cover. They are not true barometers, and how they work is disputed.

== See also ==
- Cod liver oil
