= List of sharks in California =

There are numerous species of sharks found in the Pacific Ocean; of these sharks, 36 have habitat ranges throughout the coastlines and surrounding waters of California, as identified below. Identifications include common names; scientific names; the taxonomic rank, family; conservation statuses according to IUCN; and an image.

Common name	Scientific name	Family	Conservation Status (IUCN)	Image
Common thresher	Alopias vulpinus	Alopiidae	Vulnerable	Common thresher caught off the coast of Southern California
Bigeye thresher	Alopias superciliosus	Alopiidae	Vulnerable	Bigeye thresher
Leopard shark	Triakis semifasciata	Carcharhinidae	Least concern	Leopard shark in kelp with two blacksmith damselfish
Gray smoothhound	Mustelus californicus	Carcharhinidae	Least concern	Gray Smoothhound at the Central Coast Aquarium
Brown smoothhound	Mustelus henlei	Carcharhinidae	Least concern	Brown smoothhound
Sicklefin smoothhound	Mustelus lunulatus	Carcharhinidae	Least concern	Sicklefin smoothhound
Tiger shark	Galeocerdo cuvier	Carcharhinidae	Near threatened	Tiger shark
Oceanic whitetip shark	Carcharhinus longimanus	Carcharhinidae	Critically endangered	Oceanic whitetip shark with some pilot fish
Blue shark	Prionace glauca	Carcharhinidae	Near threatened	Blue shark
Pacific sharpnose shark	Rhizoprionodon longurio	Carcharhinidae	Vulnerable	Pacific sharpnose shark
Dusky shark	Carcharhinus obscurus	Carcharhinidae	Endangered	Dusky shark with a cobia at SeaWorld
Bull shark	Carcharhinus leucas	Carcharhinidae	Vulnerable	Bull sharks
Copper shark	Carcharhinus brachyurus	Carcharhinidae	Vulnerable	Copper shark
Basking shark	Cetorhinus maximus	Cetorhinidae	Endangered	Basking shark
Frilled shark	Chlamydoselachus anguineus	Chlamydoselachidae	Least concern	Frilled shark in Aquarium Tropical at Palais de la Porte Dorée
Horn shark	Heterodontus francisci	Heterodontidae	Data Deficient	Horn shark at Monterey Bay Aquarium
Sevengill shark	Notorynchus cepedianus	Hexanchidae	Vulnerable	Sevengill shark at Monterey Bay Aquarium
Bluntnose sixgill shark	Hexanchus griseus	Hexanchidae	Near threatened	Bluntnose sixgill shark
White shark	Carcharodon carcharias	Lamnidae	Vulnerable	White shark
Shortfin mako shark	Isurus oxyrinchus	Lamnidae	Endangered	Shortfin Mako shark
Salmon shark	Lamna ditropis	Lamnidae	Least concern	Salmon shark
Smalltooth sand tiger	Odontaspis ferox	Odontaspididae	Vulnerable	Smalltooth sand tiger at Keikyu Aburatsubo Marine Park
Whale shark	Rhincodon typus	Rhincodontidae	Endangered	Whale shark at Flower Garden Banks National Marine Sanctuary
Brown catshark	Apristurus brunneus	Scyliorhinidae	Data Deficient	Brown catshark with a shortspine thornyhead
Longnose catshark	Apristurus kampae	Scyliorhinidae	Data Deficient	
Swell shark	Cephaloscyllium ventriosum	Scyliorhinidae	Least concern	Juvenile Swell shark at Cabrillo Aquarium
Filetail catshark	Parmaturus xaniurus	Scyliorhinidae	Least concern	Filetail catshark
Smooth hammerhead	Sphyrna zygaena	Sphyrnidae	Vulnerable	Smooth hammerhead at Aqua World Ibaraki Oarai Aquarium
Bonnethead	Sphyrna tiburo	Sphyrnidae	Endangered	Bonnethead at Aquarium of the Pacific
Scalloped hammerhead	Sphyrna lewini	Sphyrnidae	Critically endangered	Scalloped hammerhead
Spiny dogfish	Squalus acanthias	Squalidae	Vulnerable	Spiny Dogfish
Pacific sleeper shark	Somniosus pacificus	Squalidae	Near threatened	Pacific Sleeper shark from NOAA's 2017 CAPSTONE expedition
Pygmy shark	Euprotomicrus bispinatus	Squalidae	Least concern	Pygmy shark
Prickly shark	Echinorhinus cookei	Squalidae	Data Deficient	Prickly shark
Pacific angelshark	Squatina californica	Squatinidae	Near threatened	Pacific angelshark
Soupfin shark (also called tope shark or school shark)	Galeorhinus galeus	Triakidae	Critically endangered	Soupfin shark at Aquarium of the Bay
