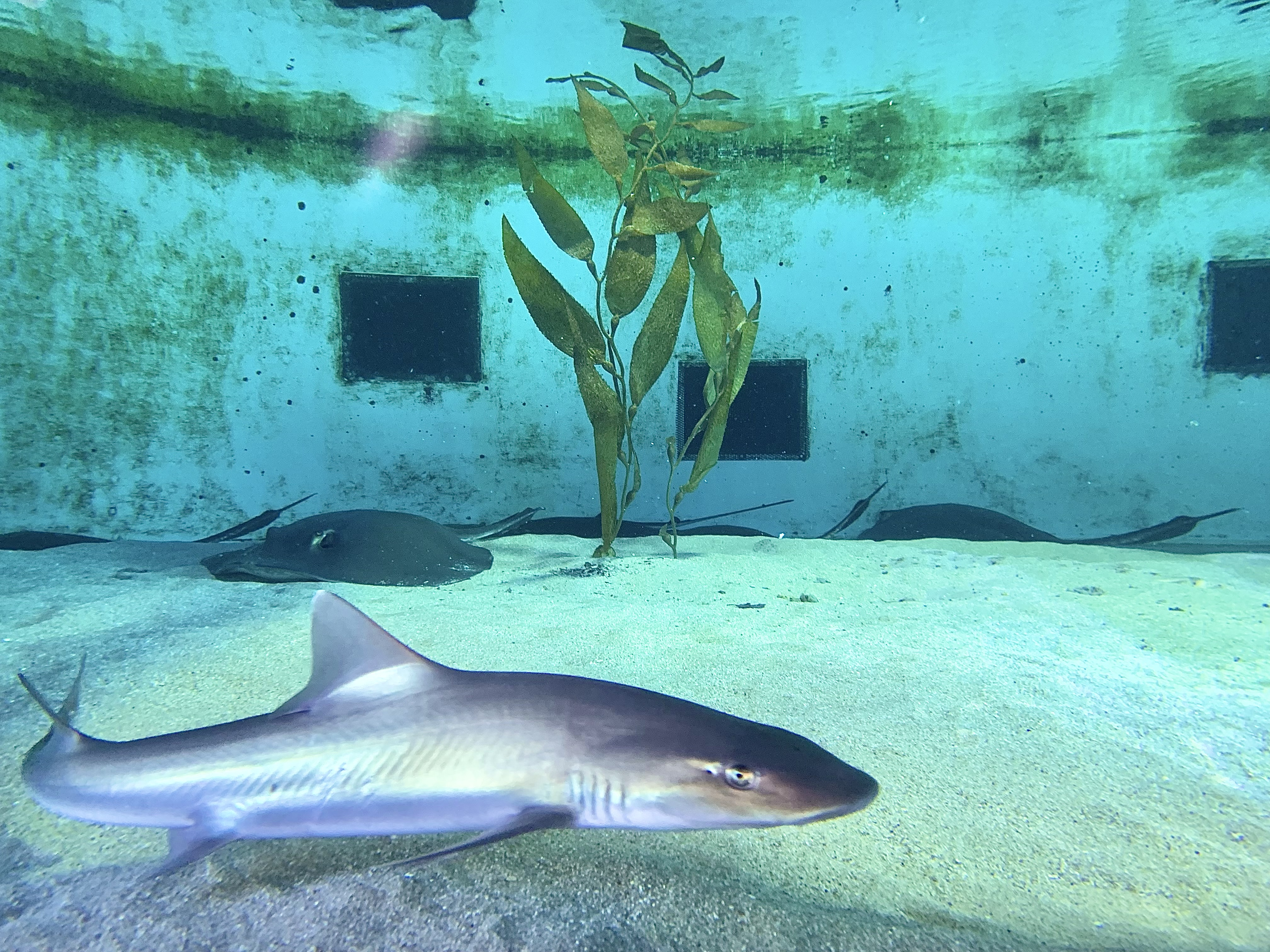

Conservation status
- Least Concern (IUCN 3.1)

Scientific classification
- Kingdom: Animalia
- Phylum: Chordata
- Class: Chondrichthyes
- Subclass: Elasmobranchii
- Division: Selachii
- Order: Carcharhiniformes
- Family: Triakidae
- Genus: Mustelus
- Species: M. californicus

Binomial name
- Mustelus californicus Gill, 1864
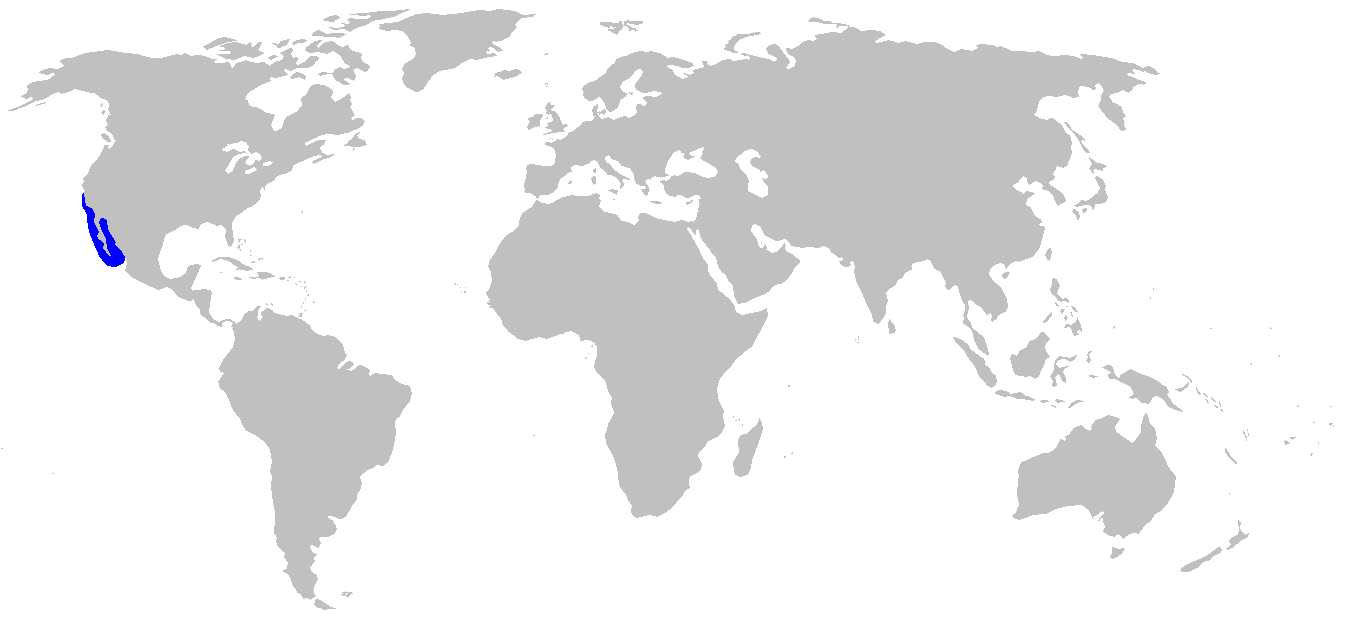

= Gray smooth-hound =

Species of shark

The gray smooth-hound (also spelled as smoothhound) (Mustelus californicus) is a houndshark of the family Triakidae. It is spotless and smooth with a narrow head and long blunted snout. This shark is found on continental shelves of the subtropical eastern Pacific. Its range extends from northern California to the Gulf of California (between latitudes 40° N and 23° N), usually residing in waters less than 80 meters (262 ft 6 in) deep. Adults are between 0.5 and 1.6 meters (1 ft 8 in to 5 ft 3 in) long. Furthermore, this shark is viviparous with an egg yolk placenta. Reproduction occurs annually and inland estuaries are common nursery grounds. Although there is little data on the shark's population trends and catch quantities, the gray smooth-hound is not considered as vulnerable to overfishing. Additionally, there have been three reported sightings of albinism in this species, which is rare for elasmobranchs (rays and sharks).

== Description ==
The gray smooth-hound is a medium-sized spotless shark with a short narrow head. It is morphologically similar to others of its genus with its slender body, long blunt snout, conspicuous sub-ocular ridges, and dorsolateral eyes. The gray smooth-hound is brown to dark-gray dorsally and white ventrally. The ventral caudal lobe (lower part of tail) is poorly developed and the second dorsal fin is relatively small.

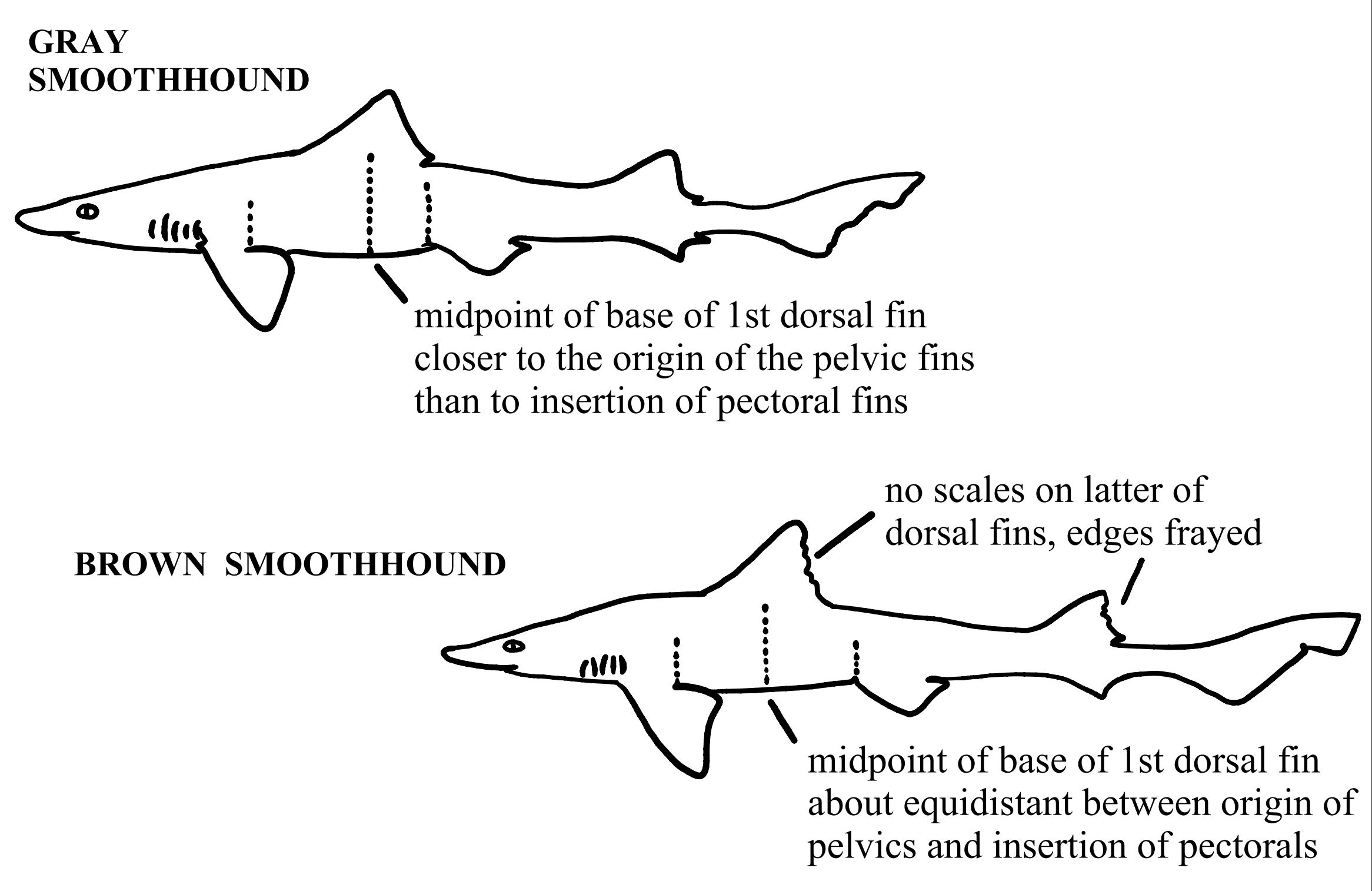
Dorsal fin differences between gray and brown smooth-hounds. Adapted from Miller & Lea 1972.

The gray smooth-hound can be distinguished by the snout shape and placement of the dorsal fin. It is often confused with the brown smooth-hound (Mustelus henlei), though there are several characteristics that differ between these two species. In the gray smooth-hound, the midpoint of the dorsal fin is closer to the start of the pelvic fin than it is to the end of the pectoral fin (see image below). In the brown smooth-hound, the midpoint of the dorsal fin is equidistant from the pelvic and pectoral fins. Additionally, the tooth shape of these two species differs slightly: gray smooth-hounds have smooth teeth that are blunt and not cusped whereas a basal cup can be seen on the sides of the middle upper teeth in the brown smooth-hound. The sides of the mandible are concaved in the gray smooth-hound but are slightly convex in brown smooth-hounds. Moreover, the posterior side of the dorsal fins have no scales and are frayed in the brown smooth-hound, which is unlike the gray smooth-hound. Scales on the sides of the brown smooth-hound are tricuspid (three pronged), which is not seen in gray smooth-hounds. Tooth and scale differences can only be observed under magnification. Additionally, another species in the genus Mustelus, the sicklefin smooth-hound (M. lunulatus), can be easily distinguished by a pointed lower lobe of the caudal fin, which is not present in the gray smooth-hound. The sicklefin smooth-hound also has a longer snout, shorter upper labial furrows, and eyes set further apart. The white-margin fin smooth-hound (M. albipinnis) has white margins on its fins, which the gray smooth-hound lacks. The sharptooth smooth-hound (M. dorsalis) has higher-cusped teeth as compared to the gray smooth-hound.

The total length of mature gray smooth-hounds ranges from around 50–160 cm (19.7-63.0 in). Females mature at a larger size and have a larger maximum reported size than males (see biology and ecology section for more details). The size at birth is around 20–30 cm (7.9-11.8 in).

== Distribution and habitat ==
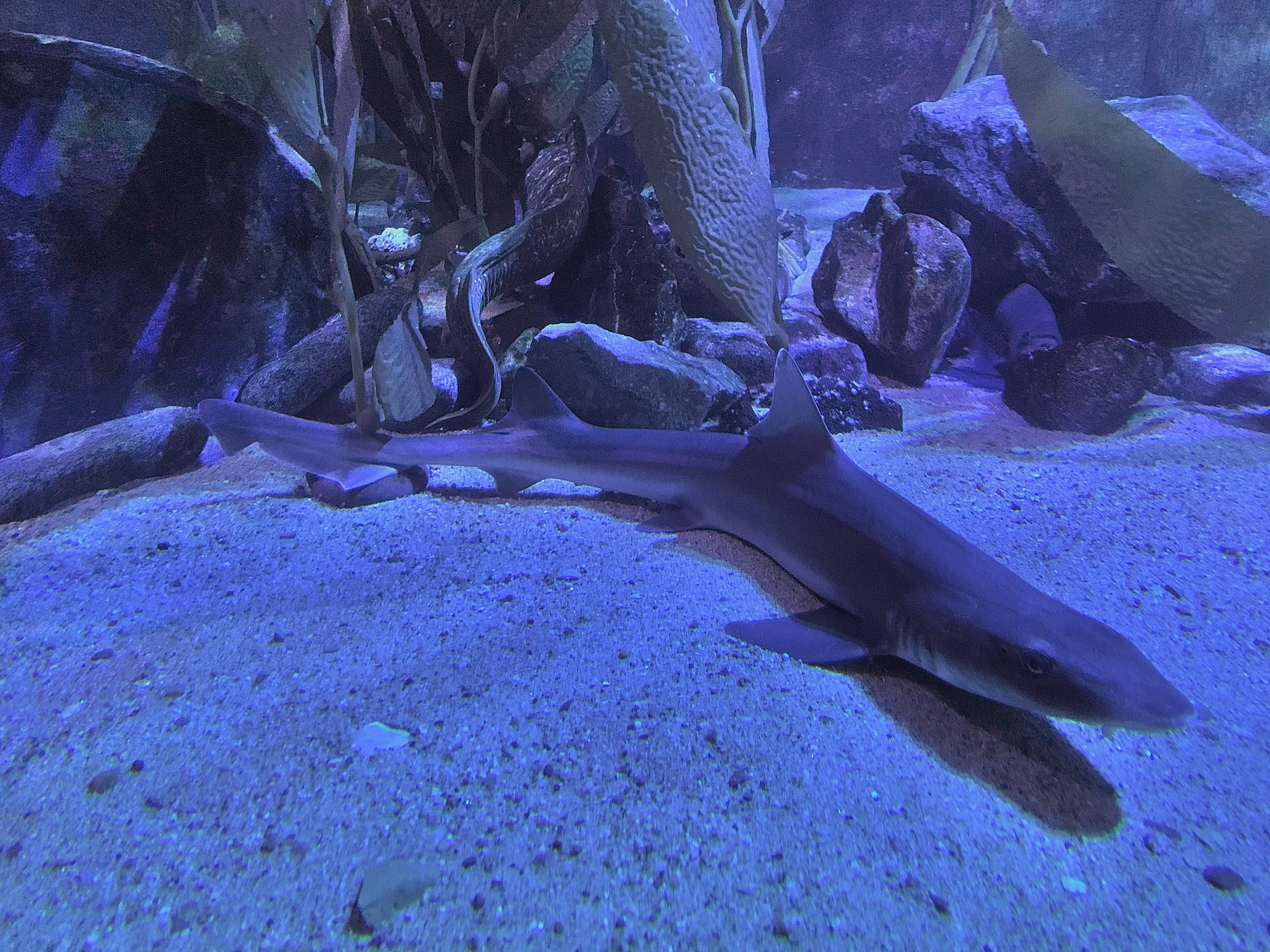
A captive gray smooth-hound

The gray smooth-hound can be found in warm waters along the coast of California and Baja California, ranging from Cape Mendocino, California to Mazatlán, Mexico. In the warm waters of Mexico and Southern California, these sharks do not migrate. However, in colder northern waters, sharks will migrate to central-northern California in the summer and then return to more southern regions during the rest of the year. These sharks are bottom-dwellers, living on continental shelves as well as shallow muddy estuaries and bays along the coast and into the Gulf of California. In California, this shark is usually found in shallow waters that are less than 12 meters (39 ft 4 in) deep, but it has been found to a maximum depth of 67 meters (219 ft 10 in). In the Gulf of California, the majority of gray smooth-hounds are found less than 80 meters (262 ft 6 in) deep but have been found up to 265 meters (869 ft 5 in) below the sea surface.

Important nursery grounds for the gray smooth-hound include the Biosphere Reserve of the upper Gulf of California, the Colorado Delta, Elkhorn Slough, and Full Tidal Basin in Bolsa Chica have also been identified as nursery grounds. In the Full Tidal Basin (after restoration efforts), gray smooth-hounds have become seasonally abundant in the summer, where the population is mostly made up of juveniles. They are most often found at the edges between eelgrass patches and muddy substrates. Eelgrass is home to many prey items of the gray smooth-hound. Additionally, most gray smooth-hounds select warmer habitats found in the middle of the basin during the day, then venture into cooler habitats where their prey is found at night. It is thought that this helps thermoregulate their body temperature. The amount of dissolved oxygen in the water is also thought to influence their movements.

== Biology and ecology ==
=== Growth ===
Gray smooth-hounds are a relatively fast-growing shark species. It only takes 2–3 years for females to mature and 1–2 years for males. They live up to a maximum of around 9 years. Generation time for this species is around a decade. At birth, females are around 23–37 cm (9.1-14.6 in) long and males are around 27-44 (10.6-17.3 in) cm long. Gray smooth-hounds are considered mature when females reach a total length of 86 cm and males reach a length of 72 cm (28.3 in). The maximum reported size is 1.632 meters (5 ft 4 in) for females and 1.16 meters (3 ft 10 in) for males.

=== Feeding ===
The gray smooth-hound is a benthic coastal predator and mostly feeds on crustaceans. Specifically, they are known to feed on crabs (Cancrids and Grapsids), shrimps, scallops, ghost shrimp (Callianassa spp.). The red rock crab (Cancer productus) and pacific rock crab (Cancer antennarius) account for most of the adult diet. Gray smooth-hounds smaller than 100 cm (39.3 in) mostly feed on the yellow shore crab (Hemigrapsus oregonensis). The yellow shore crab, along with the slender crab (Cancer gracilis), have been found to be more than 69% of the total food volume for these smaller sharks. Adults will also incorporate fish into their diet such as herring (specifically Clupea harengus pallasi) and toadfish (Porichthys notatus). Though rare, innkeeper worms (Urechis caupo) have been found in gray smooth-hound stomachs.

=== Reproduction ===
The gray smooth-hound is a viviparous (live-bearing) shark. When the embryo is developing, the yolk sac differentiates into a yolk sac placenta, which aids in nutrient and gas exchange between the embryo and the mother. Similar to other smooth-hound species, Gray smooth-hounds reproduce annually. The gestation period is estimated to be between 9–12 months. Reports for pups per litter vary from 3-17 pups. Due to their early age of maturity, large litter sizes, and yearly reproduction cycles, these sharks have high reproductive output. Moreover, the number of female and male sharks found per litter is about equal (1:1 sex ratio). There is a positive linear relationship between litter size and mother total-length, where longer females have larger litters.

Gray smooth-hounds have oviducal glands, which would allow females to store sperm from multiple matings. This suggests that females mate with multiple males (known as polyandry), though this has yet to be confirmed. The first and only record of the gray smooth-hound's mating system comes from a paper published in 2021. Tissues were collected from two small females, and their pups were genetically analyzed. They found that these two females were genetically monogamous (where the offspring of a female are only related to one male). One possible reason is that the females engaged in post-copulatory mechanisms (i.e. sperm competition and cryptic female choice), choosing sperm from one male and fertilize her eggs with. This would result in genetic monogamy within a polyandrous species. However, it is also possible that the small females avoided multiple mating encounters which would also result in genetic monogamy. Additionally, the females may be able to selectively abort embryos with low fitness. Other species of smooth-hounds seem to have low or moderate levels of multiple paternity (females carrying offspring from multiple males), so, if this information is confirmed, gray smooth-hounds would be unique in their genus for genetic monogamy. Since current mating system information comes from one study with a low sample size, more research is needed to fully understand whether gray smooth-hounds engage in multiple matings and whether they are genetically monogamous.

=== Parasites ===
Several parasites are known to infect the gray smooth-hound, which include Calicotyle californiensis, Chloromyxum ovatum, Dollfusiella litocephalus, Dollfusiella macrotrachelus, Lacistorhynchus dollfusi, Symcallio pellucidum, and Ptychogonimus megastomum.

== Albinism ==
True albinism is rare in Elasmobranchs. However, there have been three recorded instances of albinism in the gray smooth-hound. The first was an immature male (34 cm or 13.4 in long) caught on June 7, 1959. It was unclear whether this shark was a true albino as its eye color could not be determined. The second was an immature female (26.3 cm or 10.4 in long) caught on July 3, 1969. Then, on December 9, 1971, a pregnant female gillnetted in Elkhorn slough was found to have 5 albino embryos out of 10 total offspring. 3 of 6 males and 2 of 4 females were albino. 2 albino embryos were found in one ovisac, 3 from the other. These embryos were identified as truly albino—completely white with pink eyes. The pregnant female was gray and thus, heterozygous for albinism.

== Human interactions ==
Gray smooth-hounds are caught by recreational fishers, caught as by-catch, and targeted by fisheries, though this shark has low economic value. Usually, they are caught with gillnets, trawlers, or with line and hook. Young sharks are likely able to swim through gillnets. Fishing demand is highest in the Gulf of California, where as much as 500 kg (1102.3 lbs) of gray smooth-hound has been caught during a single fishing trip.

A 2015 IUCN assessment categorized gray smooth-hounds as a species of least concern. This is partially because population data from Baja California Sur implies that gray smooth-hound populations are stable. Additionally, their life history traits (e.g. high reproductive output and early age of maturity, see growth and reproduction) make these sharks more resilient to fishing and allow a larger capacity to recover from overfishing as compared with other sharks. This claim is further supported by a 2017 impact assessment, which found that gray smooth-hounds were found to not be particularly vulnerable to overfishing for similar reasons. However, the population trend of gray smooth-hounds is unknown, and the catch and by-catch data are incomplete. The Mexican government does regulate elasmobranch fisheries, but there is no information on the effectiveness of these regulations and whether they are enforced. More research is needed to fully understand the population patterns of gray smooth-hounds.
