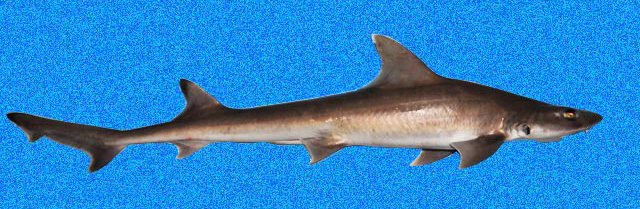

Conservation status
- Near Threatened (IUCN 3.1)

Scientific classification
- Kingdom: Animalia
- Phylum: Chordata
- Class: Chondrichthyes
- Subclass: Elasmobranchii
- Division: Selachii
- Order: Carcharhiniformes
- Family: Triakidae
- Genus: Mustelus
- Species: M. norrisi

Binomial name
- Mustelus norrisi S. Springer, 1939
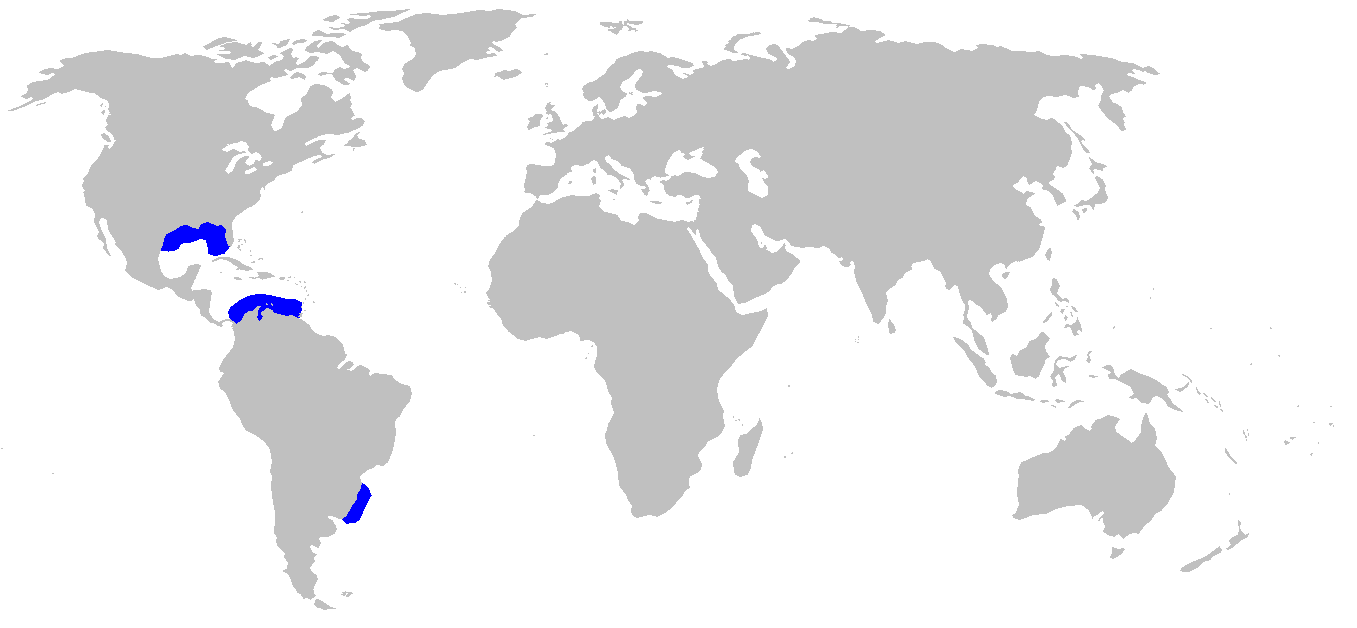

= Narrowfin smooth-hound =

Species of shark

The narrowfin smooth-hound or Florida smooth-hound (Mustelus norrisi) is a houndshark of the family Triakidae. It is found on the continental shelves of the subtropical western Atlantic, from Florida and the northern Gulf of Mexico to Venezuela, and also southern Brazil, between latitudes 32° N and 36° S, from the surface to a depth of 100 m. It can grow up to a length of 1.1 m.

It can be distinguished from sympatric M. canis by the lower lobe on its heterocercal tail fin, which is sharply pointed and posteriorly directed in M. norrisi. Additionally, the distance between the nostrils, located on the ventral surface of the head, is smaller in M. norrisi than in M. canis.

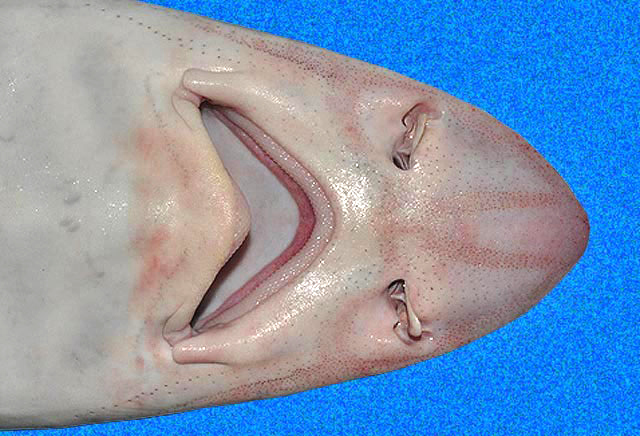
Head

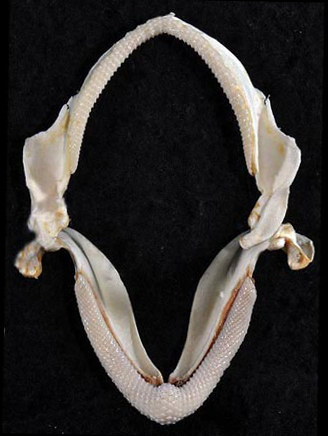
Jaws

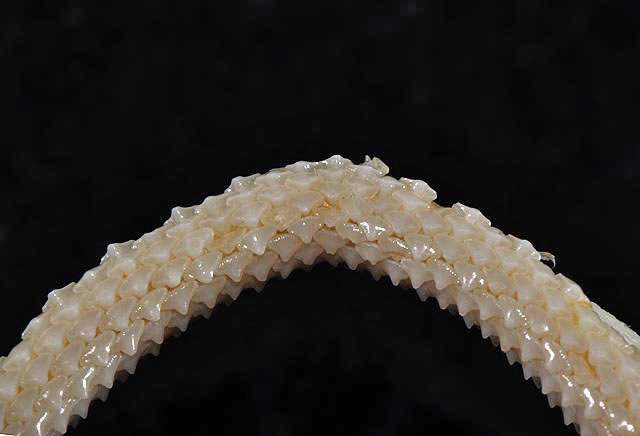
Upper teeth

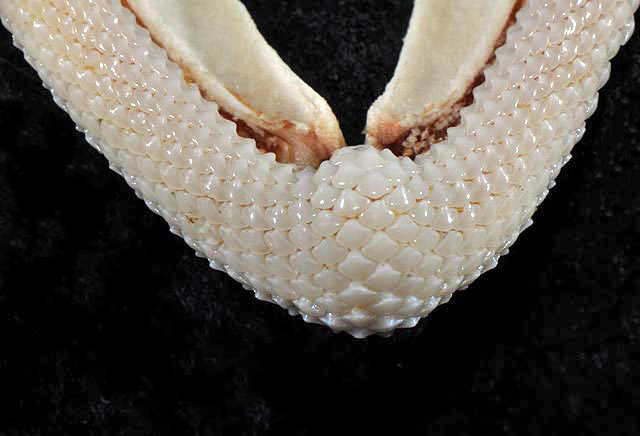
Lower teeth
