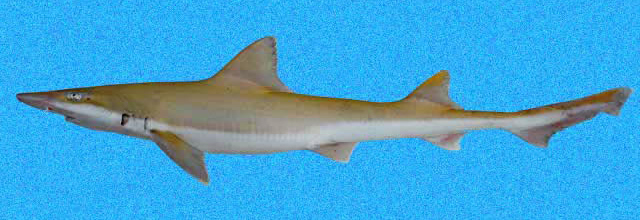

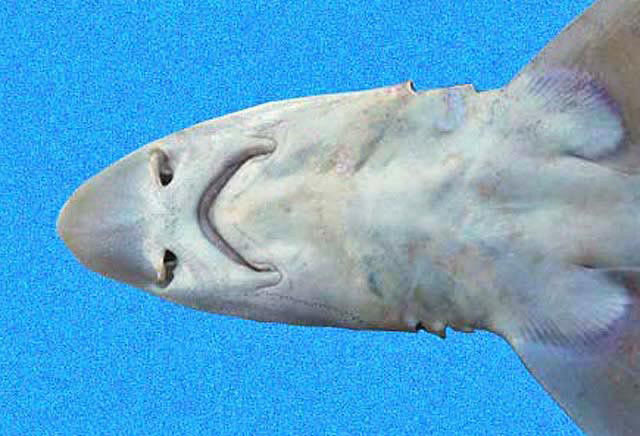

Conservation status
- Endangered (IUCN 3.1)

Scientific classification
- Kingdom: Animalia
- Phylum: Chordata
- Class: Chondrichthyes
- Subclass: Elasmobranchii
- Division: Selachii
- Order: Carcharhiniformes
- Family: Triakidae
- Genus: Mustelus
- Species: M. higmani

Binomial name
- Mustelus higmani S. Springer & R. H. Lowe, 1963
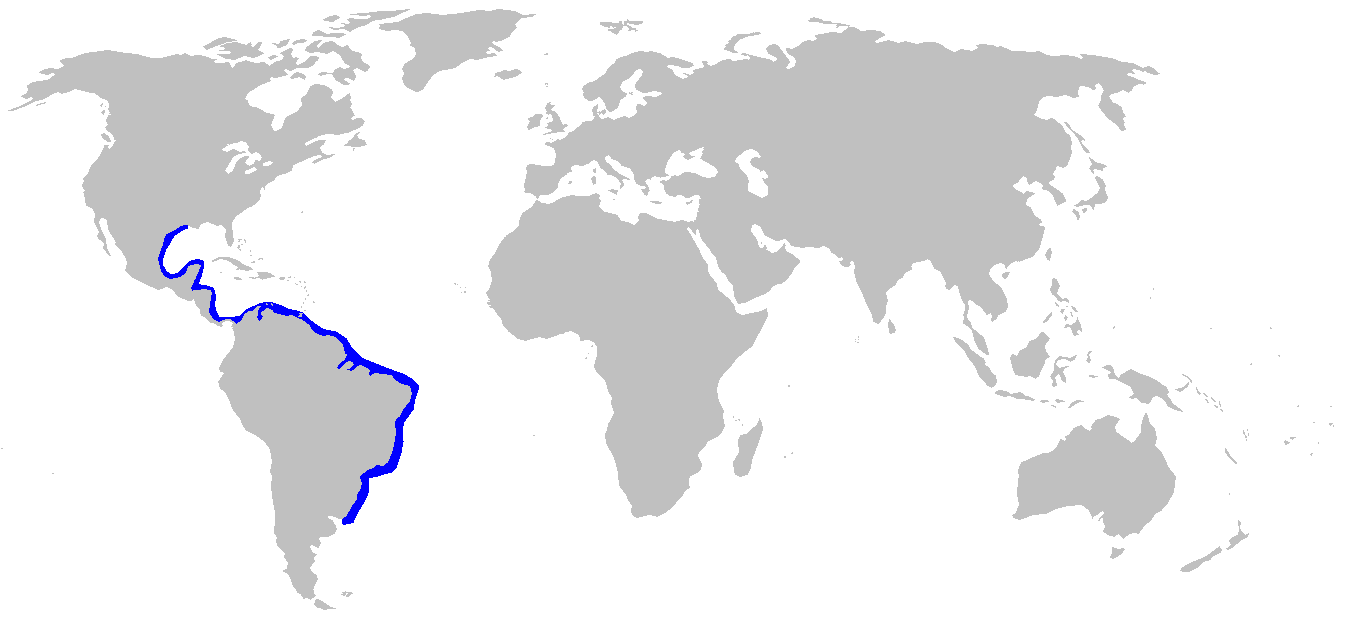

= Smalleye smooth-hound =

Species of shark

The smalleye smooth-hound (Mustelus higmani) is a houndshark of the family Triakidae. It is found on the continental shelves of the western Atlantic, between latitudes 11° N and 36° S, from the surface to a depth of 900 m (3,000 ft). It can grow up to a length of 70 cm (28 in). The reproduction of this shark is viviparous, with one to seven pups per litter.
