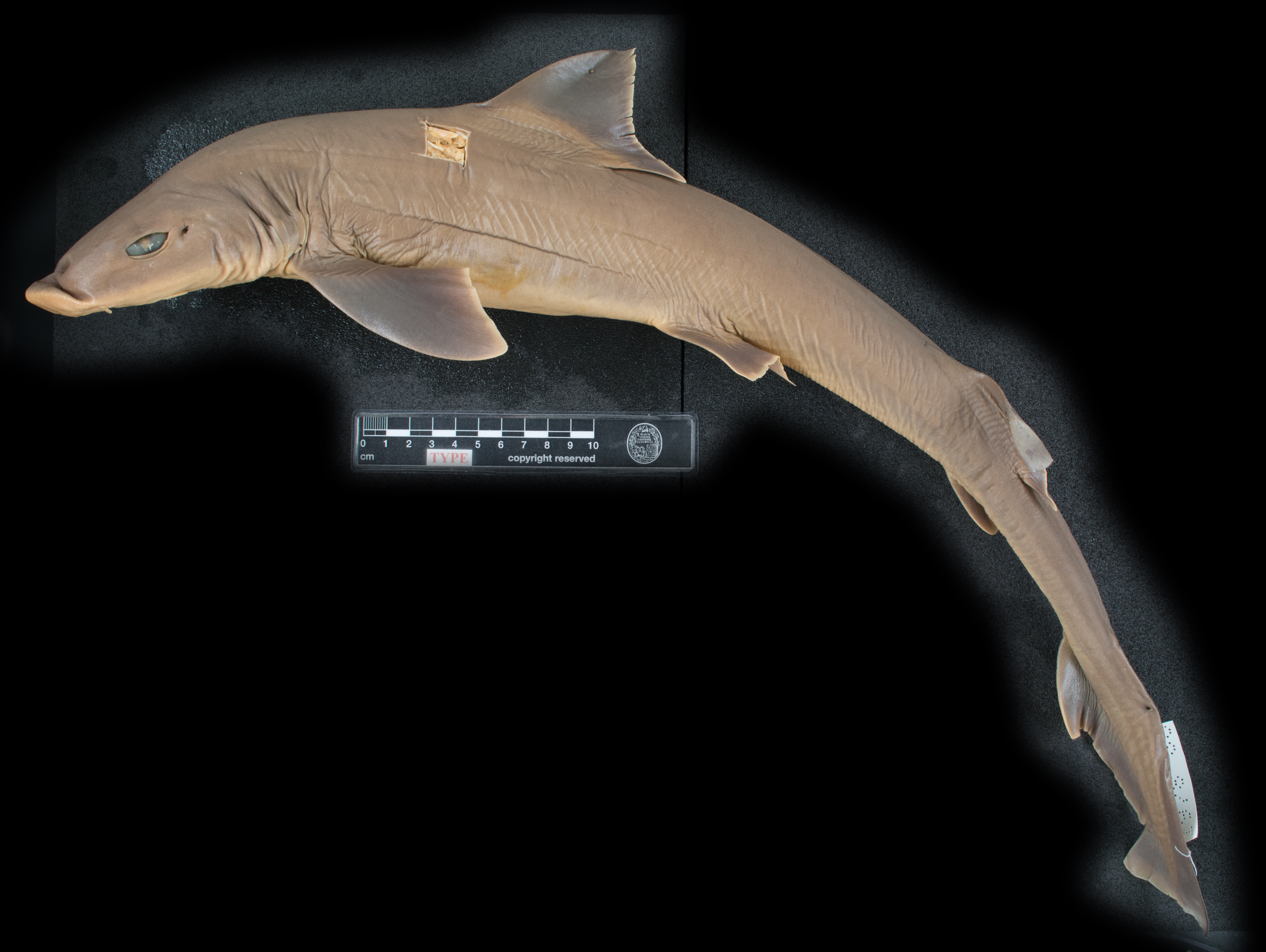

Conservation status
- Vulnerable (IUCN 3.1)

Scientific classification
- Kingdom: Animalia
- Phylum: Chordata
- Class: Chondrichthyes
- Subclass: Elasmobranchii
- Division: Selachii
- Order: Carcharhiniformes
- Family: Triakidae
- Genus: Mustelus
- Species: M. punctulatus

Binomial name
- Mustelus punctulatus A. Risso, 1827
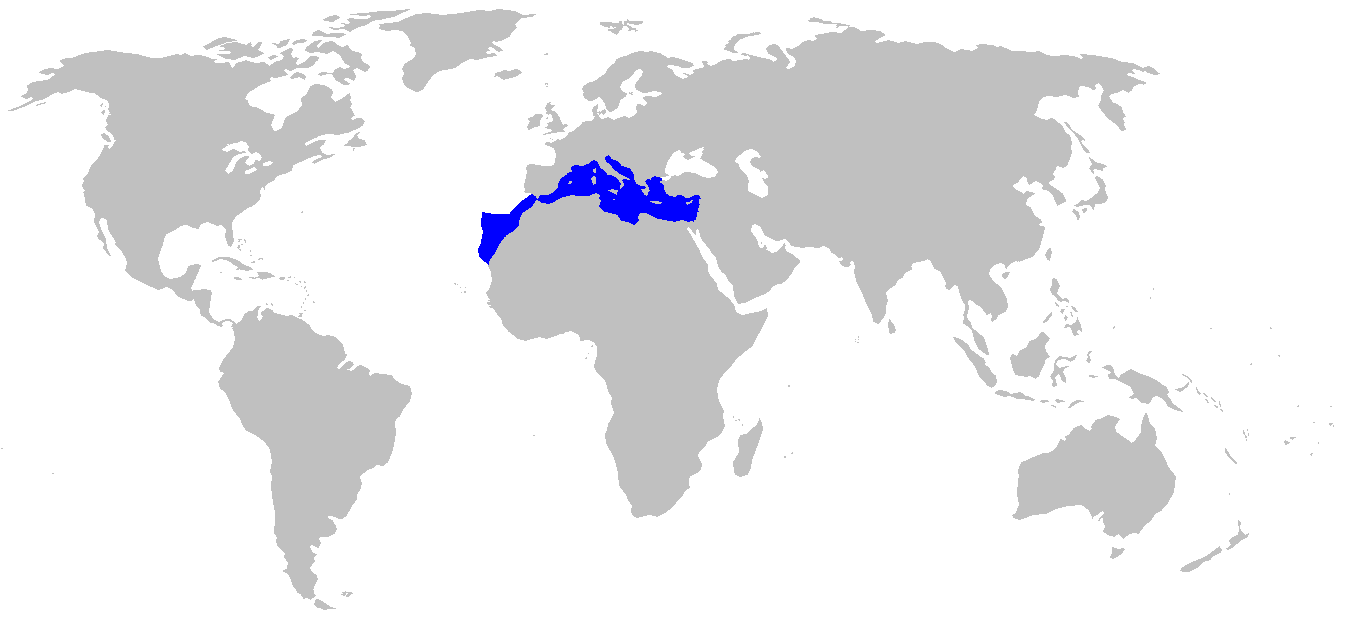

= Blackspotted smooth-hound =

Species of shark

The blackspotted smooth-hound (Mustelus punctulatus) is a houndshark of the family Triakidae found on the continental shelves of the subtropical eastern Atlantic from the Mediterranean to the Western Sahara, between latitudes 45 and 20°N, from the surface to a depth of 250 m (820 ft). It can reach of a length of 1.5 m (4 ft 11 in).

== Parasites ==
As other sharks, the blackspotted smooth-hound harbours a number of parasites. Triloculotrema euzeti is a monocotylid monogenean parasite within the nasal tissues, which was described in 2016 from sharks caught off Tunisia.
