= Striped smooth-hound =

Conservation status
- Critically Endangered (IUCN 3.1)

Scientific classification
- Kingdom: Animalia
- Phylum: Chordata
- Class: Chondrichthyes
- Subclass: Elasmobranchii
- Division: Selachii
- Order: Carcharhiniformes
- Family: Triakidae
- Genus: Mustelus
- Species: M. fasciatus

Binomial name
- Mustelus fasciatus (Garman, 1913)
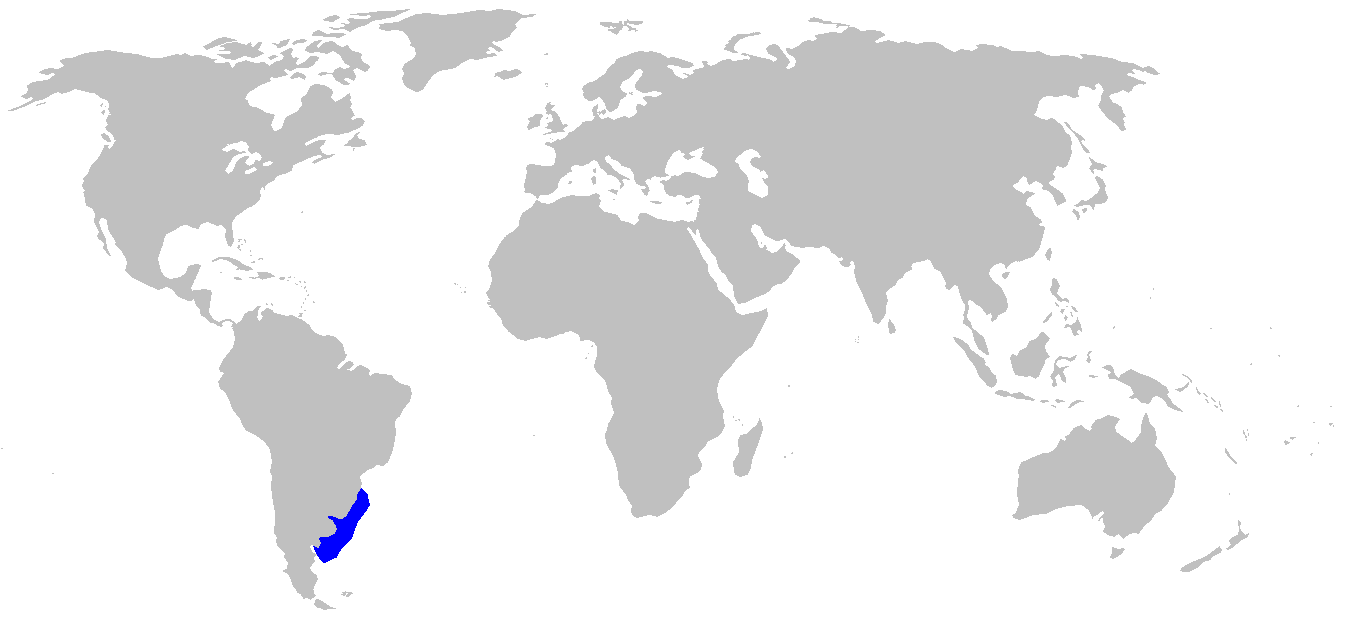

Species of shark

The striped smooth-hound (Mustelus fasciatus) is a houndshark of the family Triakidae, found on the continental shelves of the subtropical southwest Atlantic from southern Brazil to northern Argentina between latitudes 30° S and 47° S, from the surface to 250 m (820 ft). It can grow up to a length of 1.77 m (5 ft 10 in). The reproduction of this shark is Ovoviviparous, with the length at birth up to 39 cm (15 in).
