= Whitespotted smooth-hound =

Conservation status
- Least Concern (IUCN 3.1)

Scientific classification
- Kingdom: Animalia
- Phylum: Chordata
- Class: Chondrichthyes
- Subclass: Elasmobranchii
- Division: Selachii
- Order: Carcharhiniformes
- Family: Triakidae
- Genus: Mustelus
- Species: M. palumbes

Binomial name
- Mustelus palumbes J. L. B. Smith, 1957
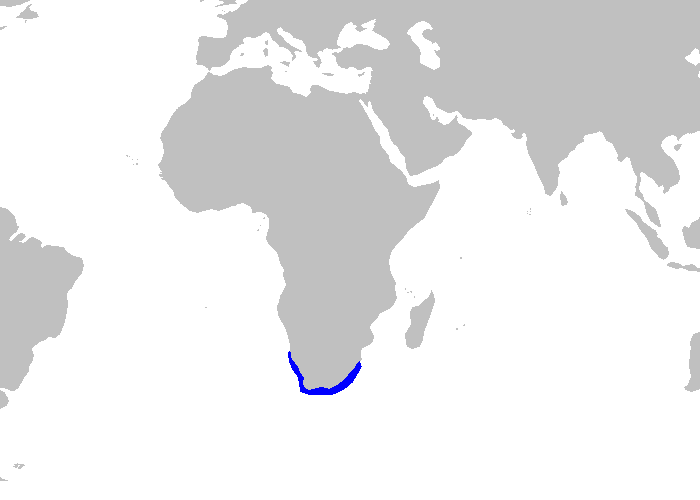

Species of shark

The whitespotted smooth-hound (Mustelus palumbes) is a houndshark of the family Triakidae. It is found on the continental shelves of the southeast Atlantic from Namibia around South Africa, between latitudes 17° S and 36° S, from the surface to a depth of 440 m. It can reach a length of 1.2 m. The reproduction of this houndshark is ovoviviparous.
