= Western spotted gummy shark =

Conservation status
- Least Concern (IUCN 3.1)

Scientific classification
- Kingdom: Animalia
- Phylum: Chordata
- Class: Chondrichthyes
- Subclass: Elasmobranchii
- Division: Selachii
- Order: Carcharhiniformes
- Family: Triakidae
- Genus: Mustelus
- Species: M. stevensi

Binomial name
- Mustelus stevensi W. T. White & Last, 2008

Species of shark

The western spotted gummy shark (Mustelus stevensi), also known as the western spotted smoothhound, is in the family Triakidae. The Triakidae, or better known as the houndsharks, are a family consisting of around 40 species in nine genera, split into two subfamilies: Triakinae (Mustelus is included in this subfamily) and Galeorhininae. The family Triakidae is in the order Carcharhiniformes. Carcharhiniformes are the largest order of sharks, containing over 270 species, including known species like the hammerhead and tiger shark. Carcharhiniformes can be characterized by the presence of a nictitating membrane over the eye, two dorsal fins, an anal fin, and five gill slits. All Carcharhiniformes are within the subclass Elasmobranchii. This subclass includes all sharks, rays, and skates. Elasmobranchii, along with Holocephali, comprise the class Chondrichthyes. Holocephali include chimaeras, also known as ratfish or ghost sharks, which are not real sharks but are closely related. There are only around 50 species in Holocephali. All of these groups make up Chondrichthyes, which are characterized as all cartilaginous fish.

== Taxonomy ==
The genus Mustelus consists of 27 recognized species. They are commonly known as "smooth-hound sharks", owing to their smooth, non-serrated teeth. These sharks are distributed globally, found in the continental shelf and slope waters of the Atlantic, Pacific, Indian, and Mediterranean oceans. Members of this genus are often difficult to distinguish from each other due to their similar appearances. Mustelus stevensi is often thought to be Mustelus antarcticus, Mustelus manso, and Mustelus lenticulatus, which all belong to a subgroup of white spotted Indo-Specific species. M. Stevensi was not recorded as its own species until 2007.

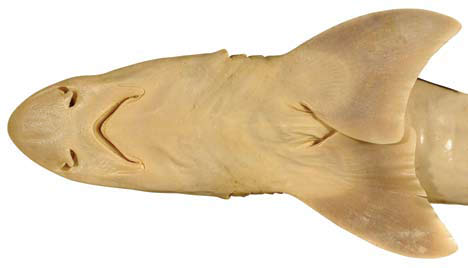

== Description ==
The western spotted gummy shark has a slender, elongated body that tapers at the tail and an oval cross-section. They have a short head with a blunt snout. This is a medium-sized shark ranging from 58 to 91.9 cm (22.8 to 36.2 in), with the maximum length ever discovered being 128 cm (50 in). Like all houndsharks, they have two spineless dorsal fins and an anal fin. They have large oval eyes, slightly on top and to the side of the head. The eyes have deep pouches underneath and a nictitating membrane. A nictitating membrane is a protective third eyelid to shield from injury, particularly during feeding. Behind the eyes are spiracles, which are small slits used for breathing when resting. Western spotted gummy sharks have a ventral mouth located under the head. It is strongly arched and wide with a large tongue and no papillae. The teeth are small, evenly spaced, with no cusplets. There are about 72–75 rows of teeth. Their coloring ranges between grey and brown shades, sometimes yellowish grey, with the underside always being paler. A lighter underside is called countershading, and its purpose is to help the shark blend into the environment better, depending on whether they are being viewed from above or below. The dorsal side (the top side) is covered with small white spots except for the head. These spots grow as the shark grows from 1mm to 3mm in size. They are found in 2–3 horizontal rows along the body near the first and second dorsal fins. The first dorsal fin is the same color as the body but has a dark edge on the back and is paler where the fin meets the body. Similarly, the second dorsal fin, the one closer to the tail, has more darkness near the tip. Juvenile sharks are the same except they have no white spots. The caudal fin, or the tail fin, is blunt and angled, not forked. It is asymmetrical with a big upper lobe and a smaller lower lobe. That shape is called heterocercal. Heterocercal tails help create both speed and lift to counteract sinking.

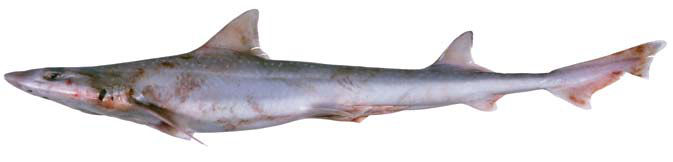

== Distribution and maps ==
The western spotted gummy shark can be found in the Eastern Indian Ocean from Northwest Australia to Southern Indonesia and the Andaman Sea. Specimens have been found in Indonesia, Myanmar, and Australia. They are mostly found in Australia, ranging from southwest of Shark Bay to northwest of Cape Leveque.

These sharks are benthopelagic, meaning they live near the ocean floor but are not attached to the bottom. They occur on the outer continental shelf and upper slope mainly at depths between 121 and 402 m (400 and 1,320 ft). Though they have been recorded up to 735 m (2,410 ft) deep. The area they inhabit is temperate or tropical coastal waters, living on the sandy floor.

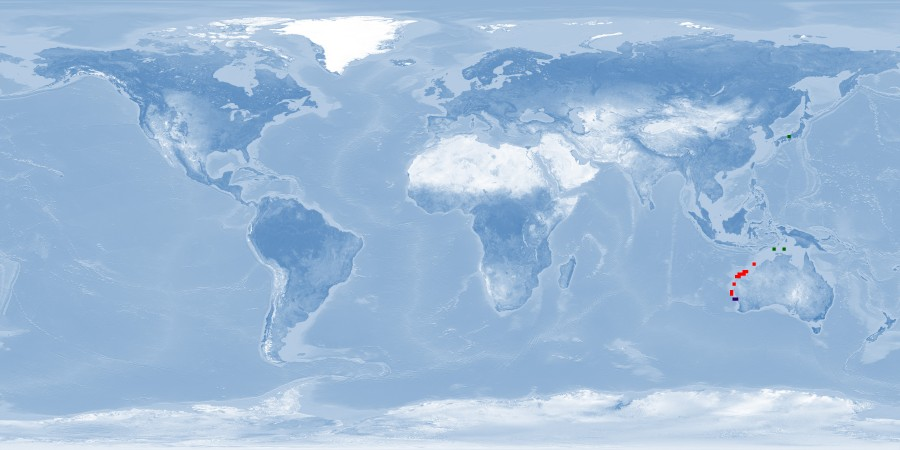

== Life history ==
The western spotted gummy shark reproduces sexually through internal fertilization. The male reproductive organ, called claspers, is a modified, extended part of the pelvic fin. The clasper is what the male shark uses to transfer sperm to the female. Once transferred and the egg is fertilized, it develops in the female's body for approximately 10 months. After gestation, the female gives birth to live young. The recorded litter sizes are between 5 and 17. The size at birth is around 28 cm (11 in). It is unknown at what age they reach maturity in terms of age; we only know size (58–91 cm (23–36 in)). Other hound sharks like the starry smooth hound (Mustelus asterias) reach maturity at 4–6 years, and the narrownose smoothhound (Mustelus schmitti) reaches maturity at around 7 years. Notable sexual dimorphism was measured in the few collected specimens. Material examined ranged from 518 to 1,034 mm (20.4 to 40.7 in) total length for females and 247–919 mm (9.7–36.2 in) for males. Females also have more posteriorly located pelvic fins, with their pelvic fin being 46.6%–46.8% total length, and males' prepelvic length being 43.8%–45.4% total length.

== Feeding habits ==
While specific data on M. stevensi is limited, most Mustelus species are benthic feeders and consume crustaceans, benthic fish, and occasionally cephalopods. Their small molar-like teeth are likely for crushing small hard prey, suggesting a diet focused on invertebrates.

== Conservation status ==
According to the IUCN Red List status, the western spotted gummy shark was most recently assessed on August 2, 2018, and was listed as Least Concern.

== Possible future concerns ==
While the western spotted gummy shark is currently not vulnerable and is listed as a species of Least Concern, ongoing environmental changes could alter its stability. Many shark species around the world are expected to be affected by the ocean's rising temperature. As the ocean warms, the shifts in temperature will force major habitat changes and range shifts, forcing sharks into new locations in search of suitable conditions. These changes can result in an ecological mismatch where predators and prey become out of sync, which will lead to disruptions across entire foodwebs and threaten the balance of the sharks' ecosystems.

=== Concern for humans ===
No concern to humans has been found. The western spotted gummy shark has been a very minor bycatch in the Western Australia West Coast Demersal Gillnet and Demersal Longline Fishery.
