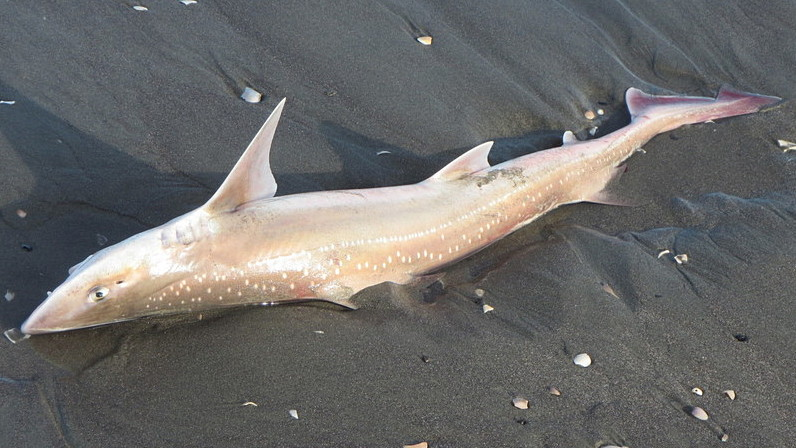

Conservation status
- Least Concern (IUCN 3.1)

Scientific classification
- Kingdom: Animalia
- Phylum: Chordata
- Class: Chondrichthyes
- Subclass: Elasmobranchii
- Division: Selachii
- Order: Carcharhiniformes
- Family: Triakidae
- Genus: Mustelus
- Species: M. lenticulatus

Binomial name
- Mustelus lenticulatus Phillipps, 1932
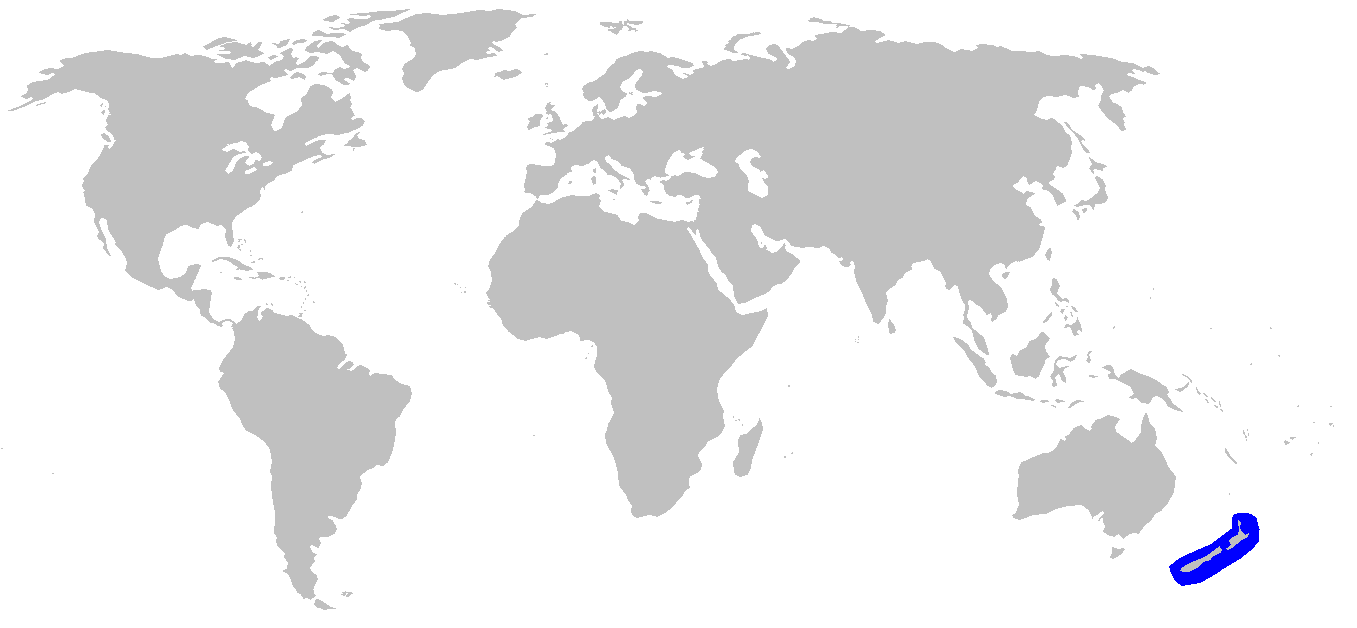

= Spotted estuary smooth-hound =

Species of shark

The spotted estuary smooth-hound or rig (Mustelus lenticulatus; Māori: makō) is a houndshark of the family Triakidae, found on the continental shelves and in estuaries around New Zealand. It is closely related to the gummy shark (Mustelus antarcticus) of Australia. Males can grow up to a length of 125 cm (49 in), while females can reach a length of 151 cm (59 in). In 2025, rigs were found to be the first known shark species capable of active sound production, namely, "clicks."

It is commercially fished, and is commonly served in fish and chip shops in New Zealand under the name "lemonfish". In June 2018 the New Zealand Department of Conservation classified the spotted estuary smooth-hound as "not threatened" with the qualifier "conservation dependent" under the New Zealand Threat Classification System.

== Names ==
In English, Mustelus lenticulatus is commonly known as the gummy shark, lemonfish, rig, spotted dogfish or spotted smooth-hound, with its full name being the spotted estuary smooth-hound. In the indigenous Māori language, the name for the species is makō. It is also known as mangō, pioke or pīokeoke in Māori, though these are generic terms, with the former being used for any shark (particularly the school shark) and the latter two being generic terms for dogfish sharks.
