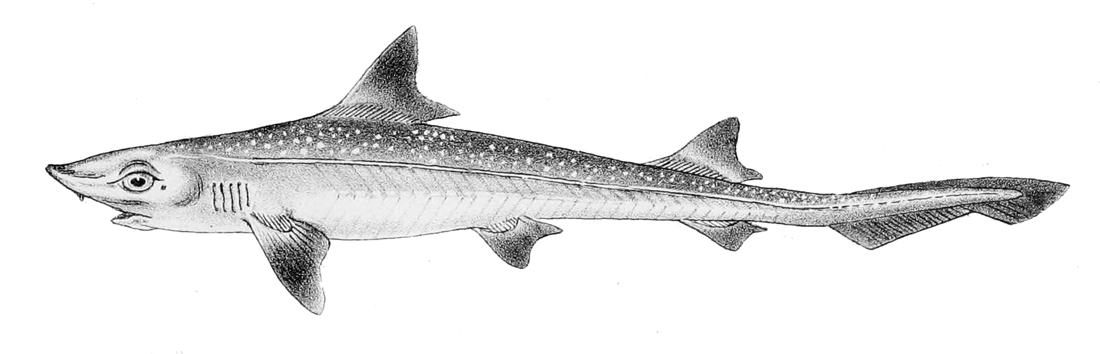

Conservation status
- Endangered (IUCN 3.1)

Scientific classification
- Kingdom: Animalia
- Phylum: Chordata
- Class: Chondrichthyes
- Subclass: Elasmobranchii
- Division: Selachii
- Order: Carcharhiniformes
- Family: Triakidae
- Genus: Mustelus
- Species: M. mustelus

Binomial name
- Mustelus mustelus (Linnaeus, 1758)
- IUCN distribution Extant (resident)

Synonyms
- Squalus mustelus Linnaeus, 1758

= Common smooth-hound =

Species of shark

The common smooth-hound (Mustelus mustelus) is a houndshark of the family Triakidae. It is found in the eastern Atlantic Ocean from the British Isles to South Africa, and in the Mediterranean Sea, Madeira, and the Canary Islands at depths ranging from 5 to 625 metres (20 to 2,050 feet), although they usually stay at depths of 5 to 50 m (20 to 160 ft). While they can grow to 200 centimetres (80 inches), their usual maximum size is 150 cm (60 in). They commonly grow to 100–120 cm (40–50 in), with a birth length of around 35 cm (10 in).

The reproduction of commons smooth-hounds is viviparous.

== Morphology and behavior ==
The common smooth-hound has a grey-brown back and is white on its underneath. It is often confused with the starry smooth-hound, which has white spots on its back. The starry smooth-hound can often have faded spots that leads to misidentification. Another shark with which it is often confused is the tope shark, although the common smooth-hound has a larger second dorsal fin. The common smooth-hound has two dorsal fins, an anal fin, a pair of pectoral fins, a pair of pelvic fins, and a heterocercal tail. All of these fins help stabilise the shark, but in males, the pelvic fins are modified to form claspers.
