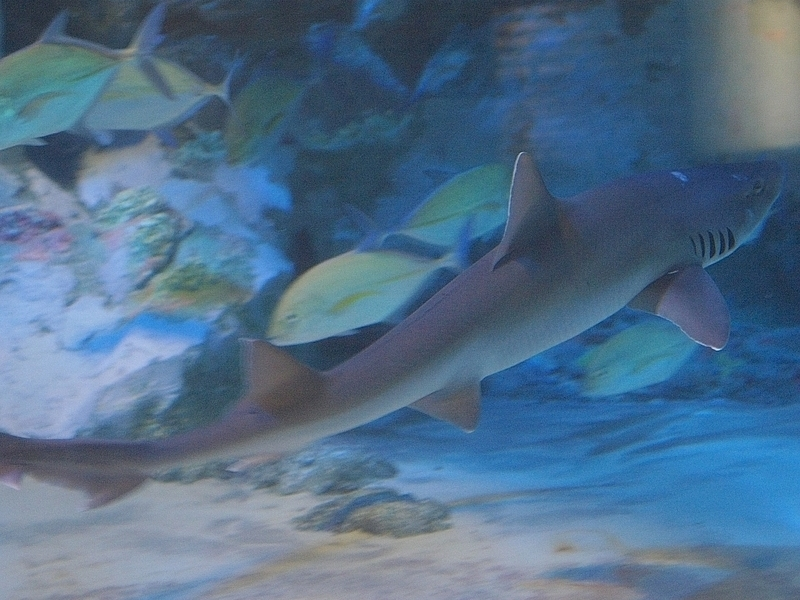

Conservation status
- Endangered (IUCN 3.1)

Scientific classification
- Kingdom: Animalia
- Phylum: Chordata
- Class: Chondrichthyes
- Subclass: Elasmobranchii
- Division: Selachii
- Order: Carcharhiniformes
- Family: Triakidae
- Genus: Mustelus
- Species: M. griseus

Binomial name
- Mustelus griseus Pietschmann, 1908
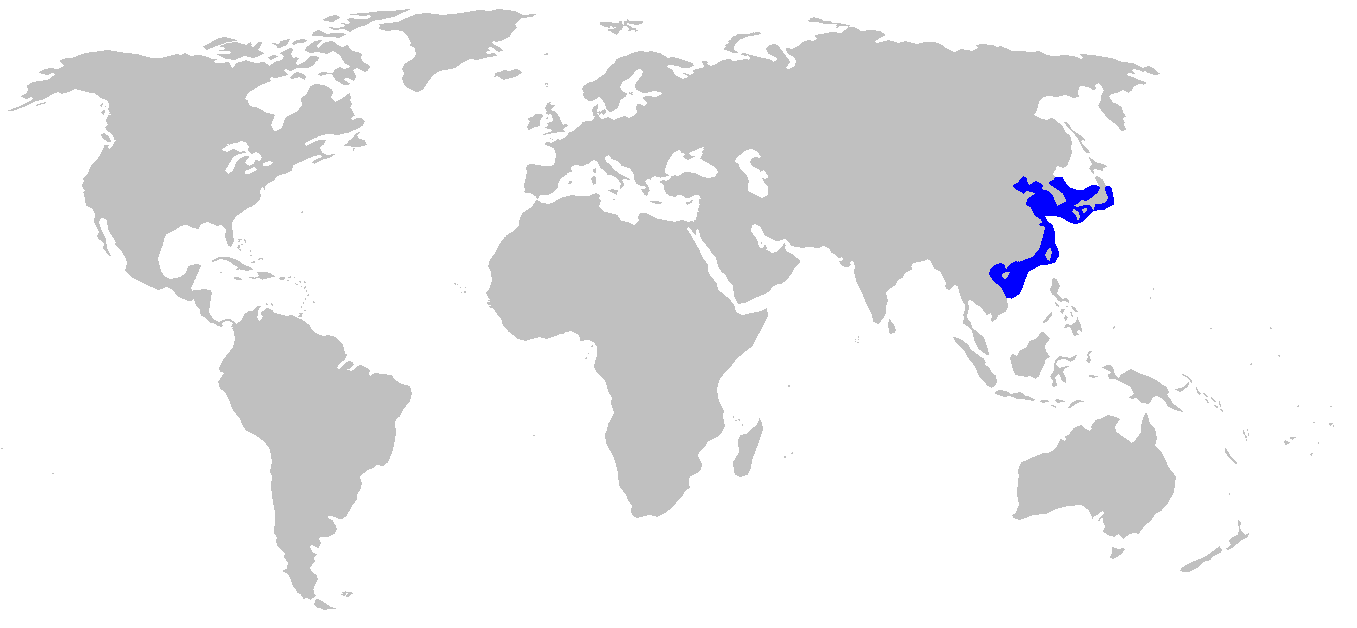
- Range of the spotless smooth-hound

Synonyms
- Musteulus kanekonis

= Spotless smooth-hound =

Species of shark

The spotless smooth-hound (Mustelus griseus) is a species of houndshark, in the family Triakidae, found on the continental shelves of the northwest Pacific, between latitudes 40° N and 11° N, from the surface to a depth of 300 m. It can grow to a length of up to 1 m (3 ft 3 in).

== Description ==
Male spotless smooth-hounds grow to a length of about 87 cm (34 in) with females growing to around 100 cm (39 in). The head is short with a fairly long, bluntly pointed snout and the body is slender. The eyes are small and close together. The mouth is long and the lower lip groove is usually longer than the upper one. The teeth are molar-like with low cusps. Both the dorsal fins have a curved trailing edge and the distance separating them occupies about 20% of the total length of the fish. The dorsal surface and flanks are grey or greyish-brown and the ventral surface is paler. The colour is uniform and there are no spots or bands of darker or lighter colour.

== Distribution and habitat ==
The spotless smooth-hound is found in the temperate and tropical Pacific Ocean between 40°N and 11°N, off the coast of Vietnam, Japan, China and Taiwan, and possibly the Philippines. It occurs on the continental shelf and in semi-enclosed areas of sea at depths down to 51 m (167 ft) and possibly as deep as 300 metres (980 ft). It is found near the seabed, often over sandy substrates and is thought to feed on crustaceans and other benthic invertebrates.

== Biology ==
The spotless smooth-hound is viviparous. Males become sexually mature at a length of between 62 and 70 cm (24 and 28 in) and females at 80 cm (31 in). Litter size varies between about five and sixteen pups which are nourished by yolk sac placentas. The gestation period is about ten months and the pups measure about 28 cm (11 in) at birth. Maximum recorded age is nine years.

== Status ==
The spotless smooth-hound is used for human consumption of its flesh and fins which are much esteemed. It is caught using gillnets, trawls and longline fishing, either as bycatch or as a targeted species. It is not known whether the level of fishing is sustainable or whether the population is in decline. The IUCN has listed its conservation status of this shark as being "endangered" and considers that further survey work needs to be done to assess population trends and catch sizes.
