= Eastern spotted gummy shark =

Conservation status
- Data Deficient (IUCN 3.1)

Scientific classification
- Kingdom: Animalia
- Phylum: Chordata
- Class: Chondrichthyes
- Subclass: Elasmobranchii
- Division: Selachii
- Order: Carcharhiniformes
- Family: Triakidae
- Genus: Mustelus
- Species: M. walkeri

Binomial name
- Mustelus walkeri W. T. White & Last, 2008

Species of shark

The eastern spotted gummy shark (Mustelus walkeri) is a species of houndshark in the family Triakidae, found in Australian waters. It is a relatively large species.

== Description ==
The eastern spotted gummy shark has tall dorsal fins, with its first dorsal-fin base being 1.6-2.0 times the anal-caudal space, with the insertion of the anal fins usually being over its apex. Juveniles have caudal fins with distinctive whitish posterior margins and the bases and inner lobes of their dorsal fins are not strongly contracted to the distal portion; the inner lobe is pale-edged. Its dorsal color is pale and grey, with numerous small, white spots on the postspiracular head and body. The light and dark tonal coloration borders on its head between the eye and the middle of the first gill slit. Its intergill membranes are much darker dorsally than ventrally.

It has a posterior margin that, as opposed to being upright distally, is directed posteroventrally from top to bottom. The long claspers of adult males are slender and strongly depressed, the inner length about 9-10% of total length, extending to just anterior of the second dorsal-fin origin. The eastern spotted gummy shark's buccopharyngeal denticles cover the entire palate and floor of its mouth. Its spiracle is usually close to the level of its mid-eye.

It has about 69-73 teeth rows, and has 78-94 precaudal vertebral centra and 35-39 monospondylous centra.
