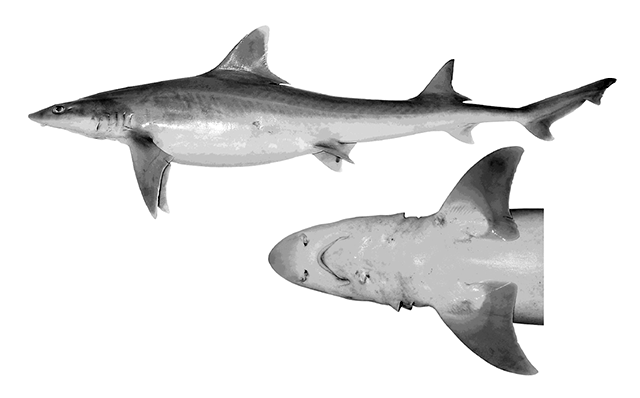

Conservation status
- Vulnerable (IUCN 3.1)

Scientific classification
- Kingdom: Animalia
- Phylum: Chordata
- Class: Chondrichthyes
- Subclass: Elasmobranchii
- Division: Selachii
- Order: Carcharhiniformes
- Family: Triakidae
- Genus: Mustelus
- Species: M. widodoi

Binomial name
- Mustelus widodoi W. T. White & Last, 2006

= White-fin smooth-hound =

Species of shark

The white-fin smooth-hound (Mustelus widodoi) is a species of tropical houndshark, and part of the family Triakidae, found in the Bali and Indonesia areas of the Western Pacific.
