= Dwarf smooth-hound =

Conservation status
- Endangered (IUCN 3.1)

Scientific classification
- Kingdom: Animalia
- Phylum: Chordata
- Class: Chondrichthyes
- Subclass: Elasmobranchii
- Division: Selachii
- Order: Carcharhiniformes
- Family: Triakidae
- Genus: Mustelus
- Species: M. minicanis

Binomial name
- Mustelus minicanis Heemstra, 1997
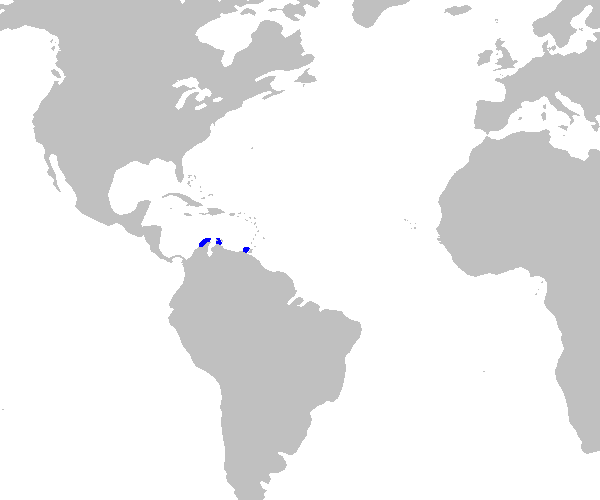

Species of shark

The dwarf smooth-hound (Mustelus minicanis) is a houndshark of the family Triakidae. It is found on the continental shelves of the tropical western central Atlantic, off the coast of South America between Cabo de la Vela, Colombia and Rio Caribe, Venezuela, at depths between 70 and 180 m (230 and 590 ft). It can grow up to a length of 48 cm (19 in). The reproduction of dwarf smooth-hounds is ovoviviparous.
