= Andaman smooth-hound =

Conservation status
- Vulnerable (IUCN 3.1)

Scientific classification
- Kingdom: Animalia
- Phylum: Chordata
- Class: Chondrichthyes
- Subclass: Elasmobranchii
- Division: Selachii
- Order: Carcharhiniformes
- Family: Triakidae
- Genus: Mustelus
- Species: M. andamanensis

Binomial name
- Mustelus andamanensis White, Arunrugstichai & Naylor, 2021
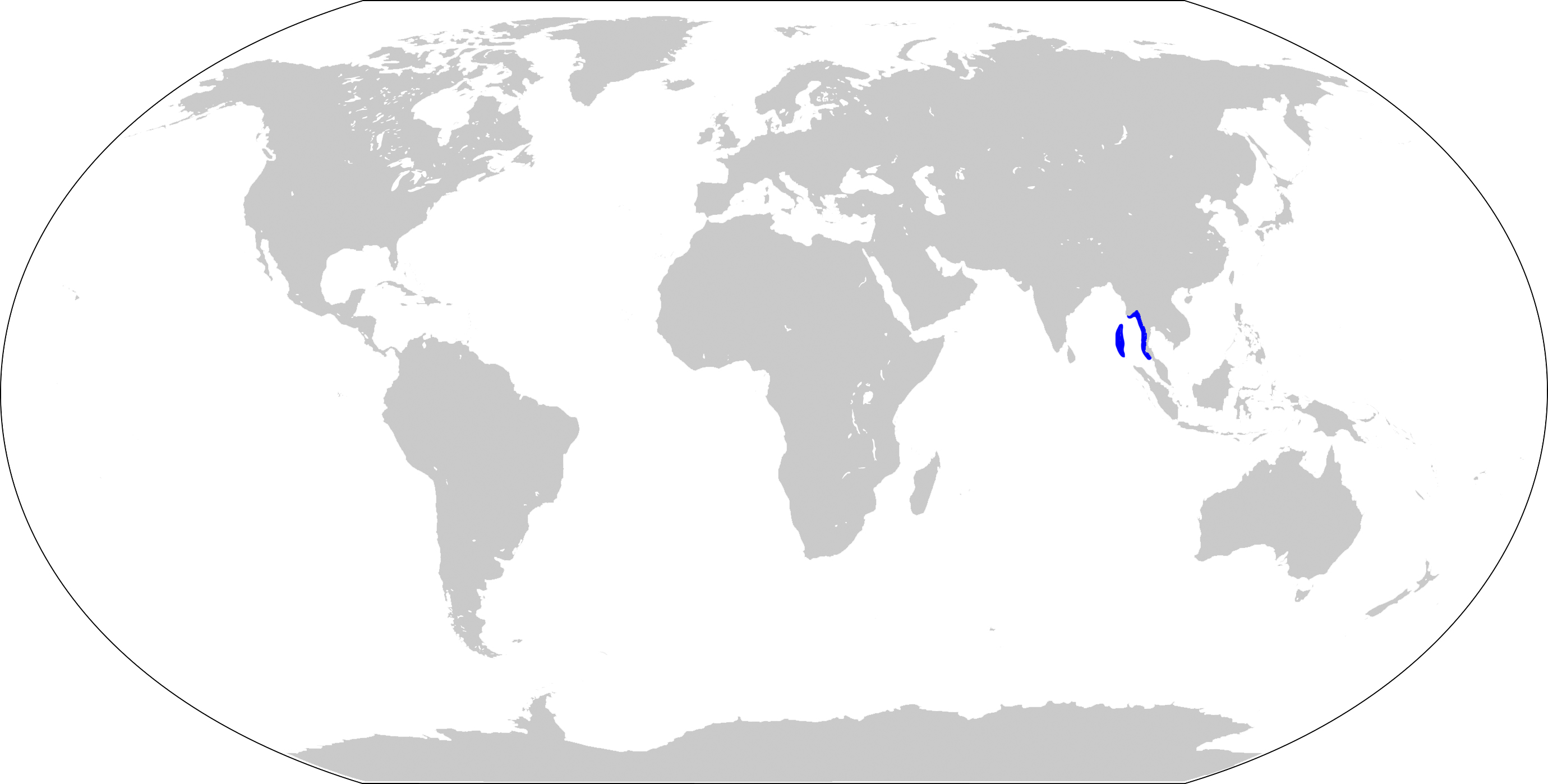
- Range of Andaman smooth-hound

Shark species

The Andaman smooth-hound (Mustelus andamanensis) is a type of smooth-hound of the family Triakidae, found in Eastern Indian Ocean (Myanmar, Thailand, and Andaman Sea). This benthopelagic shark inhabits the depths of 50–100 m (160–330 ft).

The Andaman smooth-hound can be distinguished from its congeners from a number of characteristics, such as the absence of small white spots along lateral lines and on dorsal surface, the absence of white margin on the first dorsal fin, blackish second dorsal fin, and the presence of subdivided palatoquadrate.
