= Australian grey smooth-hound =

Conservation status
- Least Concern (IUCN 3.1)

Scientific classification
- Kingdom: Animalia
- Phylum: Chordata
- Class: Chondrichthyes
- Subclass: Elasmobranchii
- Division: Selachii
- Order: Carcharhiniformes
- Family: Triakidae
- Genus: Mustelus
- Species: M. ravidus

Binomial name
- Mustelus ravidus W. T. White & Last, 2006
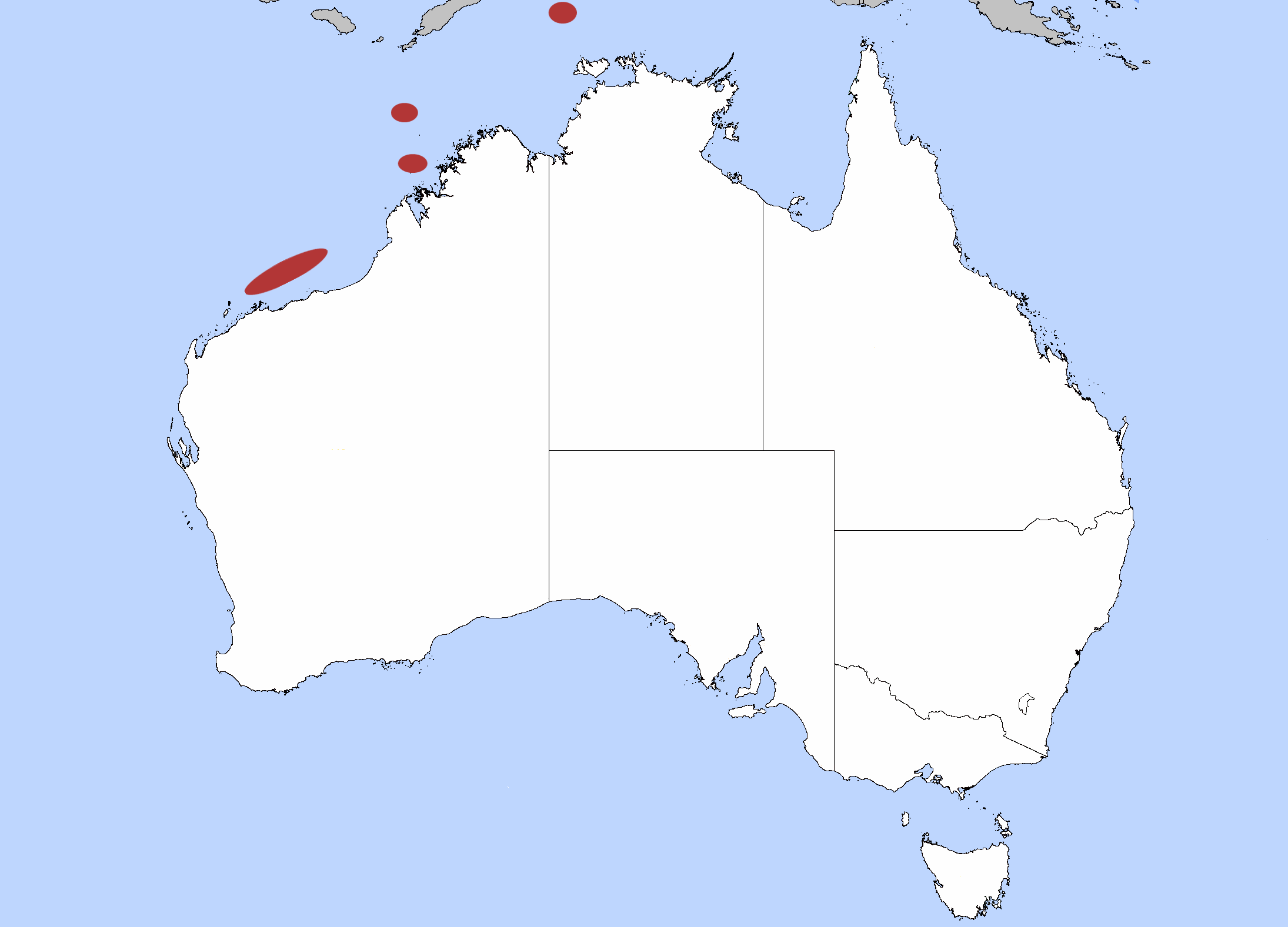
- Range of the Australian grey smooth-hound

Species of shark

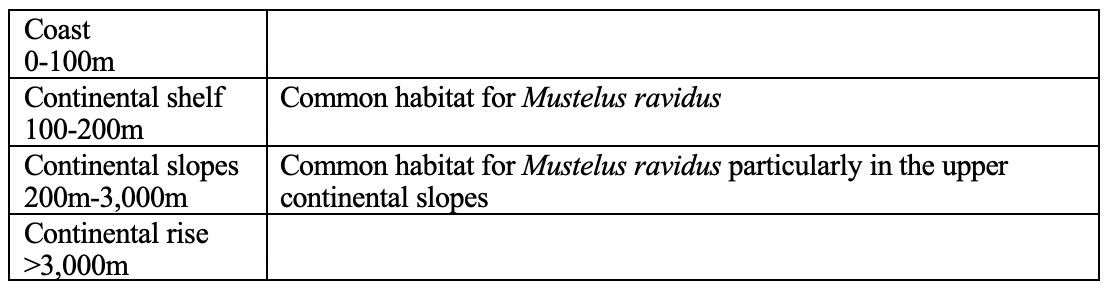
Table showing the relevant ocean depths where Mustelus ravidus is commonly found

The Australian grey smooth-hound, also known as the grey gummy shark (Mustelus ravidus) is a species of houndshark classified under the large family Triakidae. It is one of the 28 species belonging to the genus Mustelus, which are often small in length. While members of the genus Mustelus may be found globally in tropical and temperate waters, the grey gummy shark in particular is native to the Pacific Ocean and Indian Ocean waters surrounding Australia and is particularly widespread in deep coastal waters. The grey gummy shark is known to be a viviparous species and gives birth to live young. With little data available, it is regarded to have a relatively stable population and possesses little threat to humans.

== Taxonomy ==
=== Etymology ===
The grey gummy shark's scientific name, Mustelus ravidus, is derived from the Latin words for weasel (mustela) and grey, respectively. Hence, the literal translation of Mustelus ravidus is ‘greyish weasel’. Mustelus is a reference to how sharks were addressed in ancient times as weasels or mustela. However, this is to be distinguished from the genus Mustela which is scientifically used for weasels. On the other hand, ravidus denotes the grey gummy shark's dorsal colour.

=== Scientific classification and relationship with other species ===
The grey gummy shark belongs to the family Triakidae, a large family of sharks which consists of houndsharks or smooth-hounds and whose diet consists of ground-dwelling and midwater invertebrates and fishes. Additionally, it is a member of the genus Mustelus which often consists of small, benthic sharks. Additional studies by White and Last (2006) and White, Arunrugstichai, and Naylor (2021) found the genus Mustelus to be morphologically complex, with various smooth-hound species being incorrectly identified under the generic name smooth-hounds, houndsharks, or gummy sharks. Furthermore, many smooth-hound species possess very similar or overlapping traits, further complicating the differentiation of certain species. Therefore, it is not uncommon for a smooth-hound species to be incorrectly recognised as a separate species. However, this particular mis-identification has not reportedly occurred with the grey gummy shark. Presently, researchers continue to use DNA sampling to identify shark species and to further understand their history and ancestry.

In regards to the grey gummy shark's lineage with other species, experts White, Arunrugstichai, and Naylor (2021) found the grey gummy shark to be closely related to the Andaman smooth-hound (Mustelus andamanensis) and Arabian smooth-hound (Mustelus mosis). The three species form a monophyletic group which can be distinguished from other related species by the absence of white spots on the sharks’ body. In addition, similar to the Andaman smooth-hound, the grey gummy shark's skeletal upper jaw possesses subdivided palatoquadrates as opposed to undivided palatoquadrates. The main difference between a subdivided palatoquadrate and an undivided palatoquadrate is that the former involves a palatoquadrate cartilage with four parts, and the latter involves a palatoquadrate cartilage with two parts.

=== Evolution ===
There are limited recorded fossils for the genus Mustelus and, therefore, insufficient fossil findings on the species Mustelus ravidus. Ultimately, the genus Mustelus evolved into species presenting either placental viviparity or aplacental viviparity. Thus, all Mustelus produce live young; however, only some possess a placental attachment during gestation (placental viviparity). Conversely, aplacental viviparity indicates the absence of a placental attachment throughout the pregnancy. The grey gummy shark is identified as a placental and viviparous species. Accordingly, Boomer et al. (2012) found that the most recent common ancestor of the placental clade existed earlier prior to those without it (aplacental clade), which suggests that the placental species had undergone a recent divergence. Moreover, the molecular dating conducted by Boomer et al. strongly supports the theory that divergence was an integral factor in speciation in Mustelus. (2012) It is also believed that the recent and rapid speciation in the genus is a factor for its complex taxonomy.

== Distribution and habitat ==
In general, the population distribution of the genus Mustelus, which the grey gummy shark is a part of, requires active swimming and is heavily associated with coastal-benthic (or ground-dwelling) areas. Specifically, the grey gummy shark is endemic to Australia. It is commonly found in continental shelves, particularly the north-west shelf off Western Australia, and usually at the depth range 106–300 metres. This oceanic range is usually referred to as the twilight zone which spans from 200 metres to 1000 metres and is partly or wholly impenetrable by sunlight. Notably, the grey gummy shark is often found in the upper range of the twilight zone.

== Anatomy and appearance ==
=== General ===
Like most members of the family Triakidae, the grey gummy shark has two large dorsal fins, an anal fin, and nictitating eyelids. It has a pale grey skin colour with no white or other coloured spots. A further analysis of the shark's fins shows that it has an expanded and curved ventral caudal lobe. Furthermore, the grey gummy shark's dorsal fins are curved slightly backwards; its front and back dorsal fin have a white and dusky tip, respectively while its terminal caudal lobe has a distinct black tip. Its first dorsal fin, which is brownish in colour, is also taller in comparison to the second dorsal fin, which has a paler centre. In regard to pre-caudal vertebral count, the grey gummy shark has a relatively high amount ranging from 90 to 91. In addition to, counting a shark's vertebral count is one reliable way for scientists to distinguish various species.

=== Size and relationship with humans ===
With an elongated and slender body, the grey gummy shark is relatively small in size. In fact, the largest known prototype of the species is an adult female shark measured at a total length of 788 millimetres or 78.8 centimetres. Male grey gummy sharks are generally smaller and often mature at an approximate total length of 580 millimetres or 58 centimetres. In many instances, female sharks are larger than males. This is often due to the fact that female sharks require more body girth to carry eggs or young. In addition, given its small dimension and non-aggressive nature, the grey gummy shark is normally not a threat to humans. At present, there have been no recorded interactions between a grey gummy shark and humans, nor have there been reports of the shark attacking or injuring a human.

=== Jaws and teeth ===
The grey gummy shark's mouth is reasonably strong and has a broad arch. X-rays taken by White and Last (2006) further show that grey gummy shark's palatine processes are divided with a small gap on both sides; this is referred to as subdivided palatoquadrates which is composed of a palatoquadrate cartilage with four segments. In addition, the grey gummy shark has a bluntly pointed snout and between its jaws are asymmetrical teeth that have dull, rounded cusps.

=== Eyes ===
Grey gummy sharks have large eyes which are elongate-oval in shape. Like many animals, the grey gummy shark is also found to have nictitating lower eyelids and deep sub-ocular pouches. It is said that nictitating eyelids may be used to protect the animal's eye or help moisten it and maintain visibility underwater particularly since the grey gummy shark lives in the twilight zone.

=== Reproduction ===
The grey gummy shark is a placental and viviparous animal, meaning it nourishes its embryo through a placental attachment and gives birth to live young. At present, however, there is a lack of supplemental research on the shark's life cycle and mating behaviour. Nonetheless, available data suggests that a female grey gummy shark may lay between 6 and 24 pups or an average of eighteen pups during each pregnancy cycle. (IUCN, 2019) Furthermore, scientific studies demonstrate an association between the presence or absence of white spots and the reproductive mode of those belonging to the genus Mustelus. For instance, the absence of white spots on a Mustelus’ body indicates a placental reproductive mode while the presence of white spots denotes an aplacental reproductive function.

== Vulnerability and conservation status ==
In general, the intricate ecology and nature of sharks make them susceptible to human-related activities such as harvesting, habitat loss, and habitat degradation. In 2018, the grey gummy shark was assessed under the International Union for Conservation of Nature Red List of Threatened Species (commonly known as the IUCN Red List). It is now listed under the IUCN Red List's least concern (LC) category and its population is thought to be generally stable given the shark's limited contact with fisheries and the absence of major biological threats. Consequently, there are no established conservation measures specific to the grey gummy shark. However, in 1993, shark fishing was no longer permitted at the northern part of Steep Point, Western Australia which is believed to have been valuable in safekeeping the shark's stable population.

Despite this, the grey gummy shark is still moderately vulnerable to other fishing methods. According to one study, it received a fishing vulnerability rating of 52 of 100, with 100 being the highest vulnerability. In addition, the increased use of aerial drones has led to an emergence of marine recreation drone fishing which involves the use of drones in capturing small fishes and, at times, sharks. In an observation of Australian drone catches on YouTube, the grey gummy shark was found to be one of the most commonly caught species (16%) after other elasmobranchs (58%) and the Carassius auratus (24%) or more commonly known as the goldfish.

Similar to many fishes, the grey gummy shark is subject to harvesting or being a bycatch in commercial fishing. However, these chances are relatively slimmer. In fact, since 2010, the Western Australian West Coast Demersal Gillnet and Demersal Longline Fishery reported an average annual combined catch of gummy sharks of less than three tonnes. It is believed that the gummy shark (Mustelus antarcticus) comprised most of the catch, and while the species of grey gummy sharks is not specifically targeted in Western Australia, it cannot be made certain that they were never caught as bycatch. However, another fishery in Western Australia called the Pilbara Fish Trawl Fishery has stated it had no records of catching grey gummy sharks in spite of ample sampling. In the United Kingdom, other houndsharks such as the starry smooth-hound (Mustelus asteria) are also captured and sold as flake in fish and chips stores.
