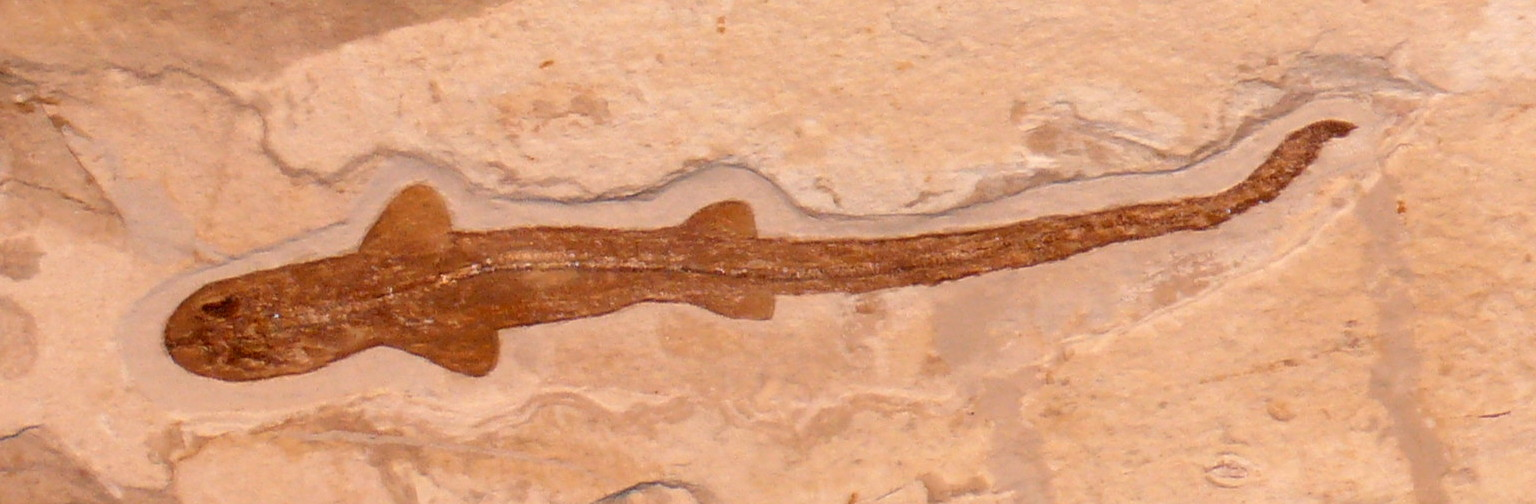
- Paratriakis curtirostris

Scientific classification
- Domain: Eukaryota
- Kingdom: Animalia
- Phylum: Chordata
- Class: Chondrichthyes
- Subclass: Elasmobranchii
- Division: Selachii
- Order: Carcharhiniformes
- Family: Triakidae
- Genus: †Palaeotriakis; Guinot, Underwood, Cappetta & Ward, 2013

= Palaeotriakis =

Palaeotriakis Temporal range: Turonian

Genus of sharks

Paleotriakis is a genus of ground sharks that lived in the Late Cretaceous period of France.

== Species ==
This genus includes two species that are originally described as species of Paratriakis.

- Palaeotriakis curtirostris (Davis, 1887)
- Palaeotriakis subserratus (Underwood & Ward, 2008)

However, for P. curtirostris, later studies still support its classification as a species of Paratriakis.
