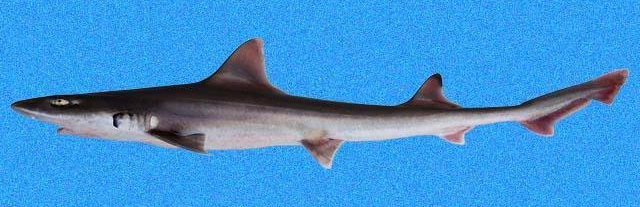

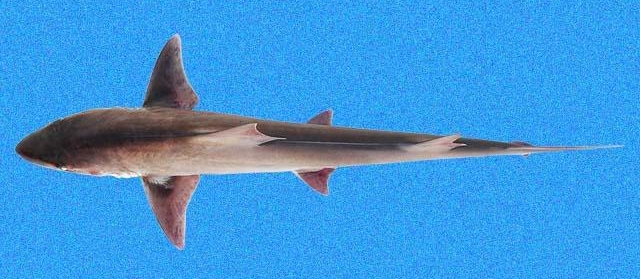

Conservation status
- Least Concern (IUCN 3.1)

Scientific classification
- Kingdom: Animalia
- Phylum: Chordata
- Class: Chondrichthyes
- Subclass: Elasmobranchii
- Division: Selachii
- Order: Carcharhiniformes
- Family: Triakidae
- Genus: Mustelus
- Species: M. lunulatus

Binomial name
- Mustelus lunulatus D. S. Jordan & C. H. Gilbert, 1882
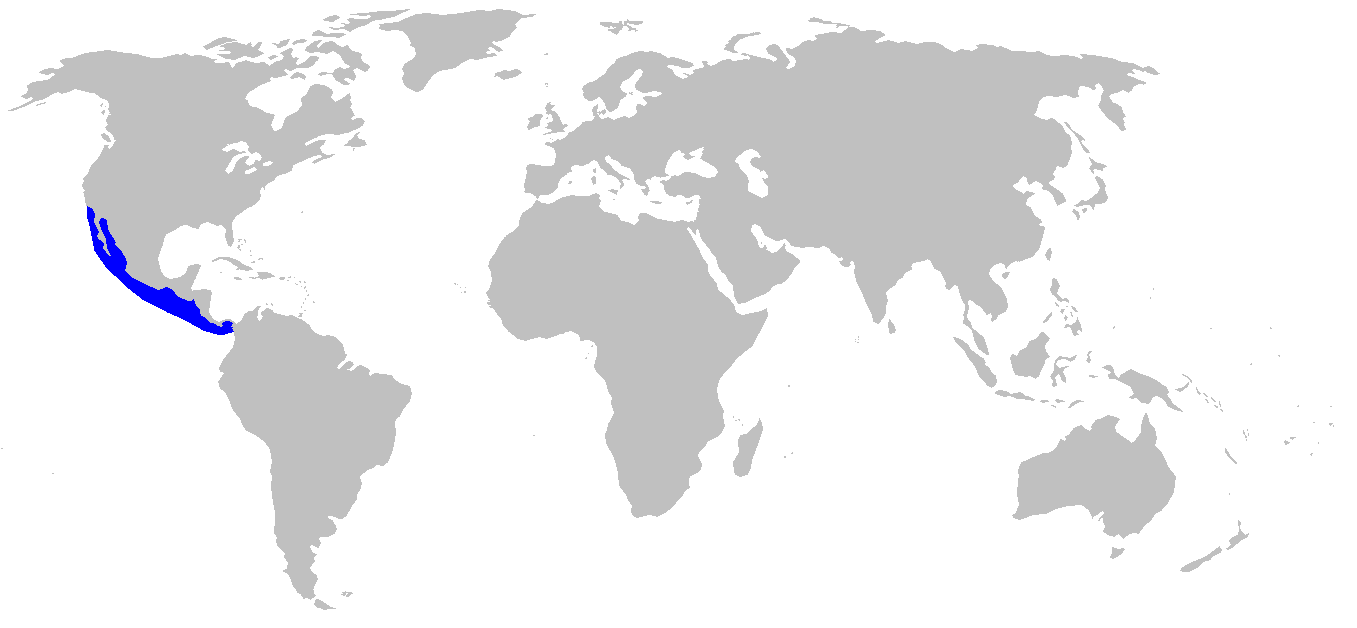

= Sicklefin smooth-hound =

Species of shark

The sicklefin smooth-hound (Mustelus lunulatus) is a houndshark of the family Triakidae. Even some species look similar to Carcharhinus family, mustelus second dorsal fin is much bigger. It is found on the continental shelves of the eastern Pacific, between latitudes 33° N and 7° N. The difference between sharptooth smooth-hound (Mustelus dorsalis) and M. lunulatus, is that the latter's second dorsal fin origin far in advance of the anal fin. It can reach a length of up to 1.7 m (5 ft 7 in). The reproduction of this shark is ovoviviparous.

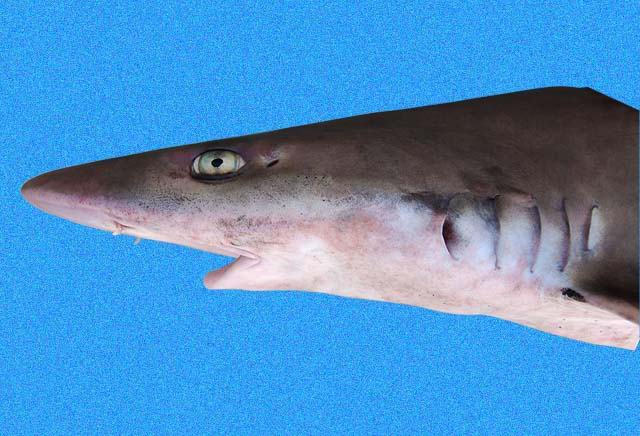

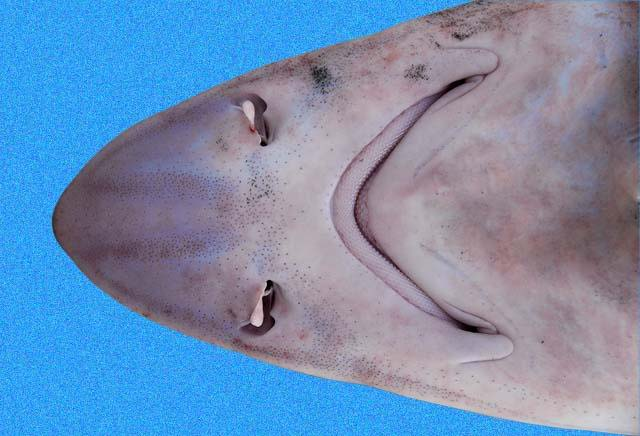
