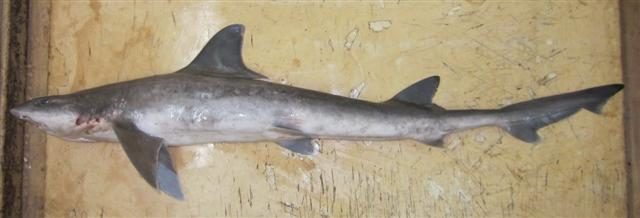
- Arabian smooth-hound (Mustelus mosis)

Scientific classification
- Kingdom: Animalia
- Phylum: Chordata
- Class: Chondrichthyes
- Subclass: Elasmobranchii
- Division: Selachii
- Order: Carcharhiniformes
- Family: Triakidae
- Subfamily: Triakinae
- Genus: Mustelus; H. F. Linck, 1790

Type species
- Squalus mustelus Linnaeus, 1758

= Smooth-hound =

Smooth-hounds Temporal range: 56–0 Ma Early Eocene to present

Genus of sharks

Mustelus, also known as the smooth-hounds, is a genus of sharks in the family Triakidae. The name of the genus comes from the Latin word mustela, meaning weasel. It should not be confused with the name Mustela, which is used for weasels.

A smooth-hound can grow to 159 cm (5 ft 3 in) long and weigh more than 13 kg (29 lb).

== Species ==
Currently, 27 recognized species are placed in this genus:

- Mustelus albipinnis Castro-Aguirre, Antuna-Mendiola, González-Acosta & De La Cruz-Agüero, 2005 (white-margin fin houndshark)
- Mustelus andamanensis White, Arunrugstichai & Naylorn, 2021 (Andaman smooth-hound)
- Mustelus antarcticus Günther, 1870 (gummy shark)
- Mustelus asterias Cloquet, 1821 (starry smooth-hound)
- Mustelus californicus T. N. Gill, 1864 (gray smooth-hound)
- Mustelus canis Mitchill, 1815
  - M. c. canis Mitchill, 1815 (dusky smooth-hound)
  - M. c. insularis Heemstra, 1997 (Caribbean smooth-hound)
- Mustelus dorsalis T. N. Gill, 1864 (sharptooth smooth-hound)
- Mustelus fasciatus Garman, 1913 (striped smooth-hound)
- Mustelus griseus Pietschmann, 1908 (spotless smooth-hound)
- Mustelus henlei T. N. Gill, 1863 (brown smooth-hound)
- Mustelus higmani S. Springer & R. H. Lowe, 1963 (smalleye smooth-hound)
- Mustelus lenticulatus Phillipps, 1932 (spotted estuary smooth-hound)
- Mustelus lunulatus D. S. Jordan & C. H. Gilbert, 1882 (sicklefin smooth-hound)
- Mustelus manazo Bleeker, 1854 (starspotted smooth-hound)
- Mustelus mento Cope, 1877 (speckled smooth-hound)
- Mustelus minicanis Heemstra, 1997 (dwarf smooth-hound)
- Mustelus mosis Hemprich & Ehrenberg, 1899 (Arabian smooth-hound)
- Mustelus mustelus Linnaeus, 1758 (common smooth-hound)
- Mustelus norrisi S. Springer, 1939 (narrowfin smooth-hound)
- Mustelus palumbes J. L. B. Smith, 1957 (whitespotted smooth-hound)
- Mustelus punctulatus A. Risso, 1827 (blackspotted smooth-hound)
- Mustelus ravidus W. T. White & Last, 2006 (Australian grey smooth-hound)
- Mustelus schmitti S. Springer, 1939 (narrownose smooth-hound)
- Mustelus sinusmexicanus Heemstra, 1997 (Gulf smooth-hound)
- Mustelus stevensi W. T. White & Last, 2008 (western spotted gummy shark)
- Mustelus whitneyi Chirichigno F., 1973 (humpback smooth-hound)
- Mustelus widodoi W. T. White & Last, 2006 (white-fin smooth-hound)
- Mustelus sp. not yet described (Sarawak smooth-hound)
- Mustelus sp. not yet described (Kermadec smooth-hound)

Synonyms

- Mustelus walkeri W. T. White & Last, 2008 (eastern spotted gummy shark) - now seen as a synonym of M. antarcticus

== See also ==
- List of prehistoric cartilaginous fish
