= White-margin fin smooth-hound =

Conservation status
- Least Concern (IUCN 3.1)

Scientific classification
- Kingdom: Animalia
- Phylum: Chordata
- Class: Chondrichthyes
- Subclass: Elasmobranchii
- Division: Selachii
- Order: Carcharhiniformes
- Family: Triakidae
- Genus: Mustelus
- Species: M. albipinnis

Binomial name
- Mustelus albipinnis Castro-Aguirre, Antuna-Mendiola, González-Acosta & De La Cruz-Agüero, 2005

Synonyms
- Mustelus hacat Pérez-Jiménez, Nichizaki & Castillo Geniz, 2005

Species of shark

The white-margin fin smooth-hound (Mustelus albipinnis) is a smooth-hound from the Gulf of California, off the coast of Mexico. The white-margin fin smooth-hound shark is slender, dark grey-brown in color, and grows up to 1.2 m (3 ft 11 in) long.
