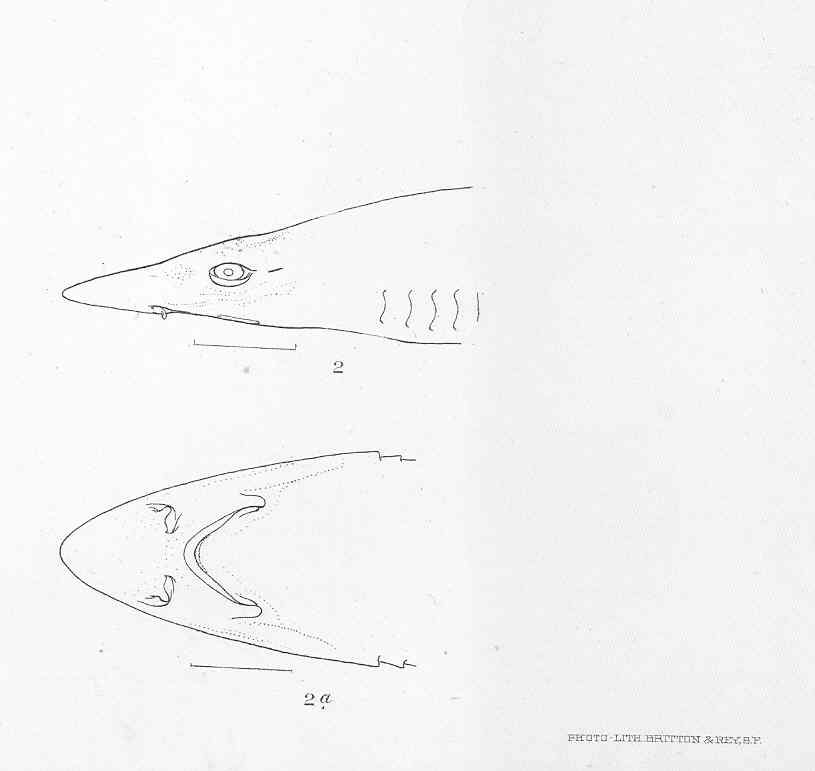

Conservation status
- Vulnerable (IUCN 3.1)

Scientific classification
- Kingdom: Animalia
- Phylum: Chordata
- Class: Chondrichthyes
- Subclass: Elasmobranchii
- Division: Selachii
- Order: Carcharhiniformes
- Family: Triakidae
- Genus: Mustelus
- Species: M. dorsalis

Binomial name
- Mustelus dorsalis Gill, 1864
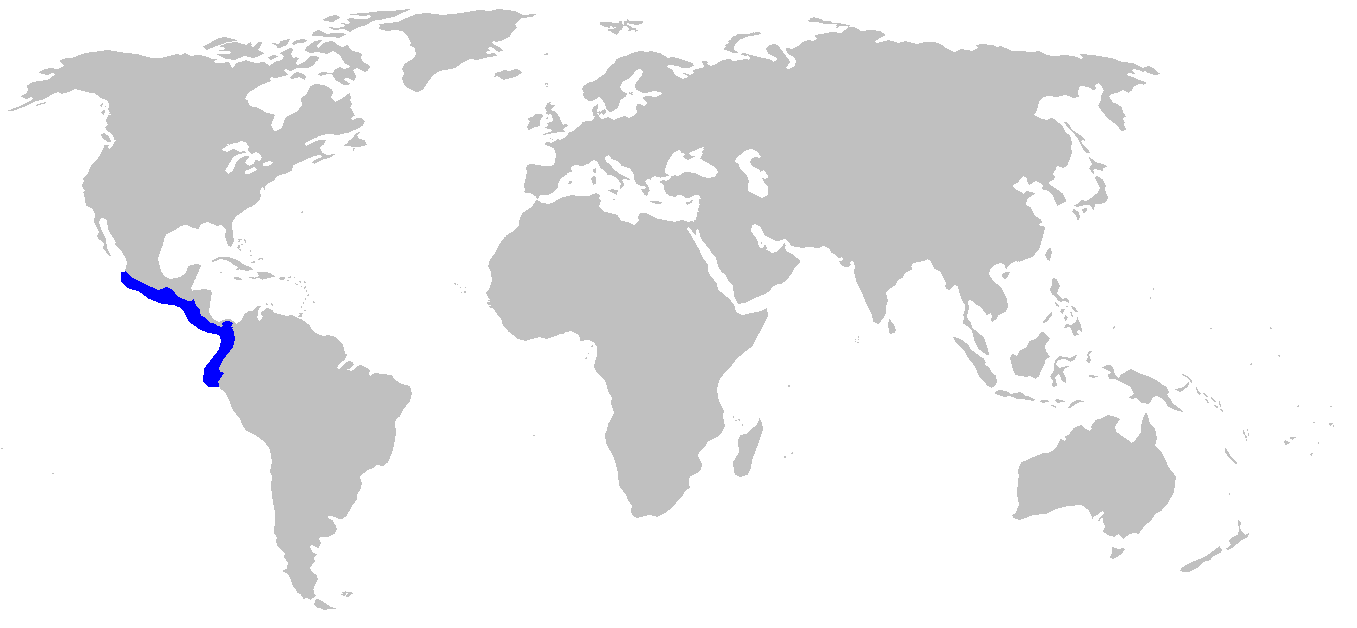

= Sharptooth smooth-hound =

Species of shark

The sharptooth smooth-hound (Mustelus dorsalis) is a houndshark of the family Triakidae. It is found on the continental shelves of the tropical eastern Pacific from southern Mexico to Peru between latitudes 20°N and 5°S. Its length is up to 64 cm (25 in).

The sharptooth smooth-hound dwells on the bottom, feeding on crustaceans, particularly shrimp. Reproduction is viviparous, with four pups per litter, and length at birth about 21 cm (8.3 in).
