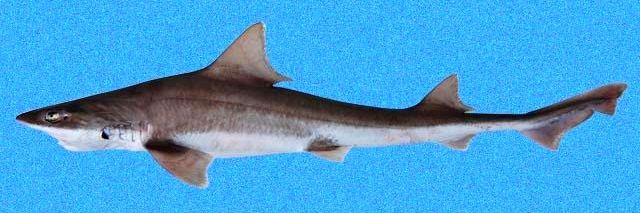

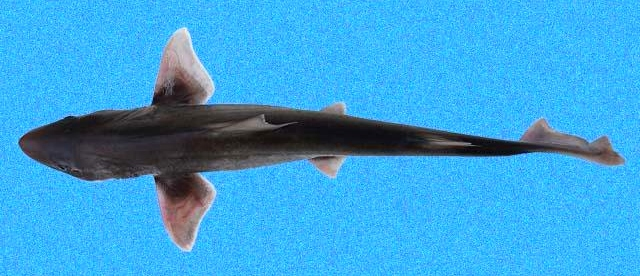

Conservation status
- Least Concern (IUCN 3.1)

Scientific classification
- Kingdom: Animalia
- Phylum: Chordata
- Class: Chondrichthyes
- Subclass: Elasmobranchii
- Division: Selachii
- Order: Carcharhiniformes
- Family: Triakidae
- Genus: Mustelus
- Species: M. henlei

Binomial name
- Mustelus henlei (Gill, 1863)
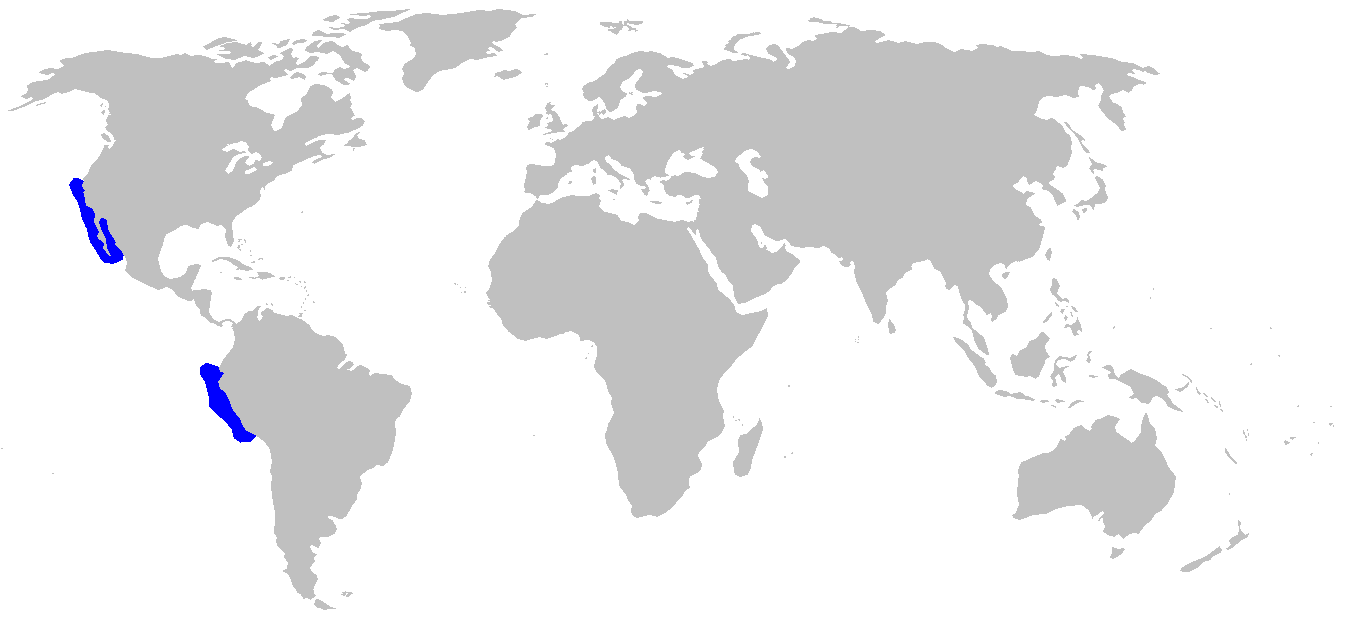

Synonyms
- Rhinotriacis henlei Gill, 1863; Triakis henlei (Gill, 1863)

= Brown smooth-hound =

Species of shark

The brown smooth-hound (Mustelus henlei) is a houndshark of the family Triakidae. The reproduction of this shark is viviparous. The brown smooth-hound reaches a maximum reported size of 95.0 cm and a minimum of 27.6cm amongst males while females can range from 25.7 cm to 100 cm although males reach their asymptotic length sooner than females. The average size of this species is between 50 and 70 cm and is between 19 and 21 cm at birth. Females at maternity are around 67.6 cm long whereas the average length at maturity is 63.6 cm for males and 65.6 cm for females. This species is a ground shark and has a heterocercal caudal fin bearing an elongate upper lobe, triangular and broad dorsal fins, broad pectoral fins, an inferior mouth, and large eyes, and displays a reddish or bronze coloration from above and a silverish coloration on the underside. The shark is additionally slender, long-snouted, and sharp-toothed. The teeth of the brown smooth-hound often bear a narrow primary cusp and one or two accessory cusplets.

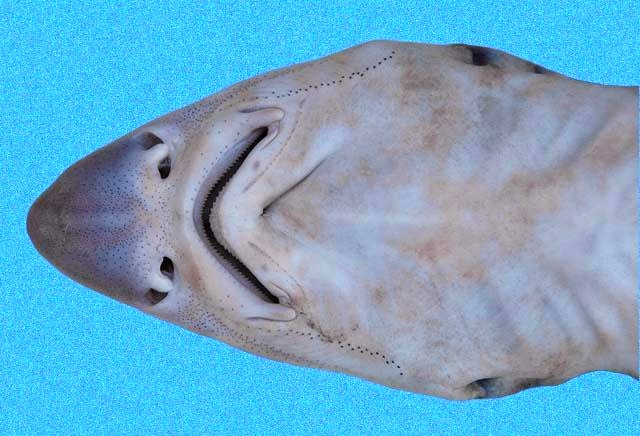

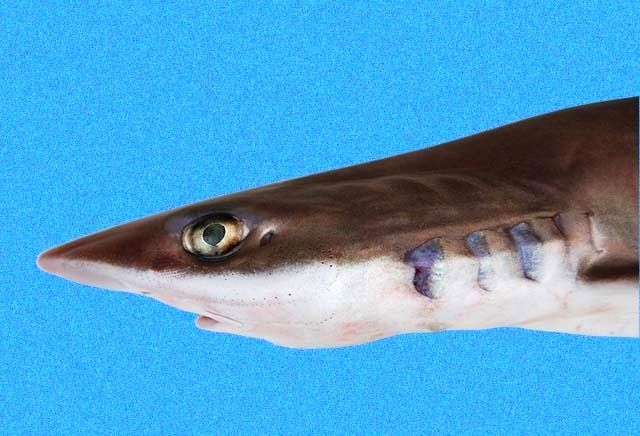

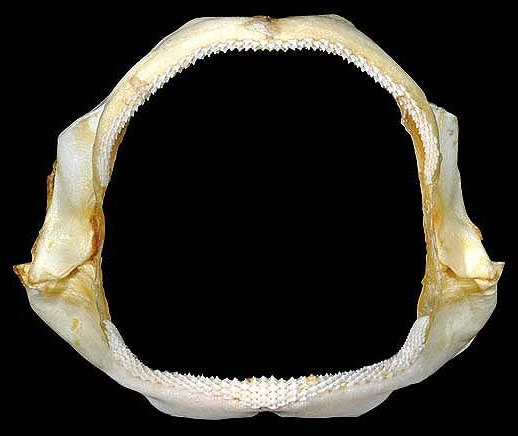
Jaws

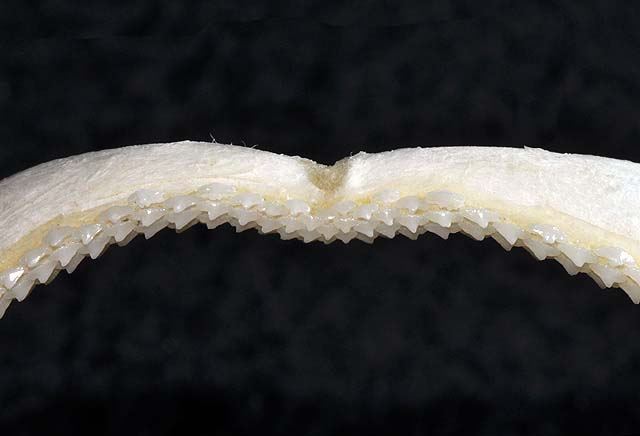
Upper teeth

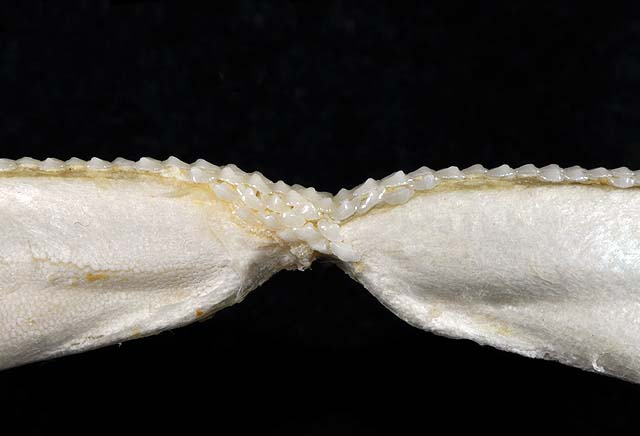
Lower teeth

== Distribution ==
It is found on the continental shelves of the subtropical eastern Pacific, from northern California to the Gulf of California, as well as Ecuador and Peru between latitudes 43° N and 18° S, from the surface to depths of 266 meters and is considered to be endemic to the nearshore shark assemblage in the northeastern Pacific. The shark is generally found in enclosed, shallow, and muddy bays and has the largest distribution in its genus in the eastern Pacific. Although the species is epibenthic, some individuals often foray into the pelagic zone when hunting for prey. The species also engages in seasonal migrations into deeper, coastal waters and although it spends most of its time in the bays, it departs during wintertime as waters cool, migrating out of estuarine waters between November and April specifically and returning in around May. The shark travels an average of 15.3 km per day as part of these migrations and has the ability to cover long distances through continuous swimming. Gene flow and population connectivity investigations have revealed that there are three primary populations of the species, two of which, the Northern Californian population and the Costa Rican population, have genetically diverged greatly from the third, the population at Central-Southern California and Mexico. More specifically, three of the subpopulations of the species are found in the Gulf of California and two are found off the west coast of the Baja California Peninsula.

== Biology ==
The brown smooth-hound typically reaches maturity within 2 to 3 years and has a fecundity of around 1 to 20 pups per year, producing 3 to 5 pups per litter but the number can go up to 10 for the sharks at the Californian coast and to 21 for the sharks at the Northern Gulf of California. The shark reproduces annually with a 10-month gestation period. The largest embryos were found in females between late January and mid-March and the largest oocytes were found in March.

This species generally faces predation pressure from other shark species and piscivorous birds. The feeding nature of the brown smooth-hound itself, however, is not fully conclusive as a study of 340 stomachs of both mature and immature individuals off the coast of Costa Rica hinted that it is an opportunistic predator feeding generally on cephalopods, stomatopods, teleosts, and shrimps. Mature sharks fed more often on teleosts whereas immature sharks fed primarily on crustaceans and had a more diverse diet. However, a study of 102 sharks in Baja California Sur displayed that the species mainly consumes the red crab and occasionally on mantis shrimps and sardines, emblematic of a specialist feeder, signifying that the predation behavior of the species can vary by location. A 2017 research study on food resource partitioning habits found that the species almost entirely feeds on Teleostei and that there was significant dietary overlap between juveniles and adults as well as males and females. Sharks found in deep and shallow waters share similar diets, primarily feeding on the pelagic red crab and unidentified organic matter as well as fish like mackerel and mollusks according to diet composition analysis of 166 individuals. Carbon-13 and nitrogen-15 stable isotope analysis of the species' muscle tissue revealed that it usually hunts in oceanic zones and consumes prey from high trophic levels and further cemented that the two sexes share a similar diet, meaning that there is no sexual segregation in the species.

== Conservation status ==
The brown smooth-hound's conservation status is least concern as per an assessment in 2014. Despite a minor dip in commercial catches from 2006 to 2013, landings rose to 1.80 tonnes by 2014. There have been no clear signs of population declines on account of the shark being fished in low volumes by recreational anglers and due to the species' comparatively high fecundity and early maturation age. This species is not heavily pursued by any particular fishery and any accidental commercial catches are sold at low prices. The California Department of Fish and Wildlife monitors the commercial landings of the shark through the Marine Landing Data System which have a minimum size requirement of 18 inches whereas the Commercial Passenger Fishing Vessel logs and the California Recreational Fisheries Survey samplers record the recreational landings of the shark. There are very few threats facing this species since it is not caught in large numbers by recreational anglers and since bycatch comprises a majority of its commercial landings. The brown smooth-hound does not enjoy any species-specific conservation measures anywhere across the Americas; however, shark fishing is prohibited in Mexican coastal waters from May to July to minimize shark fishing pressure. The species is caught with gillnets of large mesh sizes off the coast of Baja California Sur, with gillnets of comparatively smaller mesh sizes alongside trawl nets and bottom-set longlines in the Gulf of California, and with trammel nets, otter trawls, and hooks in shallow waters off the coast of California.

The shark derives its ecological and fishing importance from the fact that it is a mesopredator, meaning that it occupies a trophic level in around the middle of the food web. While it lacks any cultural importance, it is the most prominent species in the artisanal fisheries in the Pacific coast of the Baja California Peninsula, comprising 30% of the annual capture of coastal sharks and 24.2% of all elasmobranch captures with gill nets. The shark has comparatively less interest in the American waters north of Mexico.
