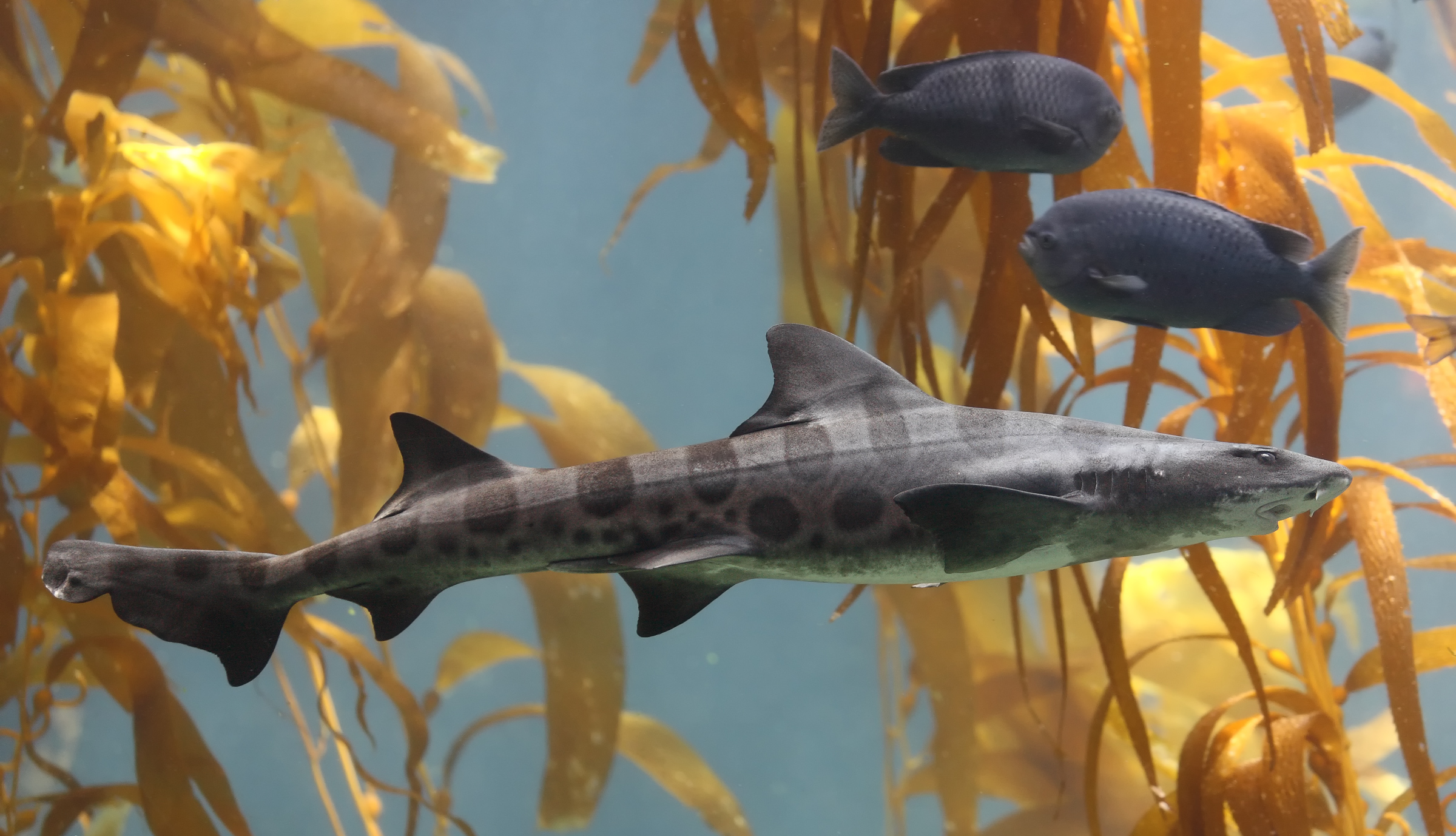
- Leopard shark (Triakis semifasciata)

Scientific classification
- Kingdom: Animalia
- Phylum: Chordata
- Class: Chondrichthyes
- Subclass: Elasmobranchii
- Division: Selachii
- Order: Carcharhiniformes
- Suborder: Carcharhinoidei
- Family: Triakidae; J. E. Gray, 1851

Subfamilies and genera
- see text

= Houndshark =

Houndsharks Temporal range: Cenomanian–Recent

Family of sharks

The Triakidae or houndsharks are a family of ground sharks, consisting of about 40 species in nine genera. In some classifications, the family is split into two subfamilies, with the genera Mustelus, Scylliogaleus and Triakis in the subfamily Triakinae, and the remainders in the subfamily Galeorhininae.

Houndsharks are distinguished by possessing two large, spineless dorsal fins, an anal fin and oval eyes with nictitating eyelids. They are small to medium in size, ranging from 37 to 220 cm (1.21 to 7.22 ft) in adult length. They are found throughout the world in warm and temperate waters, where they feed on small fish and invertebrates on the seabed and in midwater.

Fossil records of this group date back to the Cenomanian.

== Genera ==
Houndsharks are classified into subfamilies and genera as follows:

- Galeorhininae Gill, 1862
  - Furgaleus Whitley, 1951 (whiskery shark)
  - Galeorhinus Blainville, 1816 (school shark)
  - Gogolia Compagno, 1973 (sailback houndshark)
  - Hemitriakis Herre, 1923
  - Hypogaleus J. L. B. Smith, 1957 (blacktip tope)
  - Iago Compagno & Springer, 1971
- Triakinae Gray, 1851
  - Mustelus H. F. Linck, 1790 (smooth-hound)
  - Scylliogaleus Boulenger, 1902
  - Triakis J. P. Müller & Henle, 1839

The following fossil genera are also known:

- ?†Archaeotriakis Case, 1978 (alternatively placed in Pseudotriakidae)
- †Gomphogaleus Adnet & Cappetta, 2008
- †Kallodentis Engelbrecht, Mörs, Reguero & Kriwet, 2017
- †Khouribgaleus Noubhani & Cappetta, 1997
- †Meridiogaleus Engelbrecht, Mörs, Reguero & Kriwet, 2017
- †Pachygaleus Cappeta, 1992
- †Palaeogaleus Gurr, 1962
- †Palaeotriakis Guinot, Underwood, Cappetta & Ward, 2013
- †Paratriakis Herman, 1977
- †Rhaibodus Böhm, 1926
- †Squatigaleus Cappetta, 1989
- †Xystrogaleus Adnet, 2006
