= Whiskery shark =

Conservation status
- Least Concern (IUCN 3.1)

Scientific classification
- Kingdom: Animalia
- Phylum: Chordata
- Class: Chondrichthyes
- Subclass: Elasmobranchii
- Division: Selachii
- Order: Carcharhiniformes
- Family: Triakidae
- Genus: Furgaleus; Whitley, 1951
- Species: F. macki

Binomial name
- Furgaleus macki (Whitley, 1943)
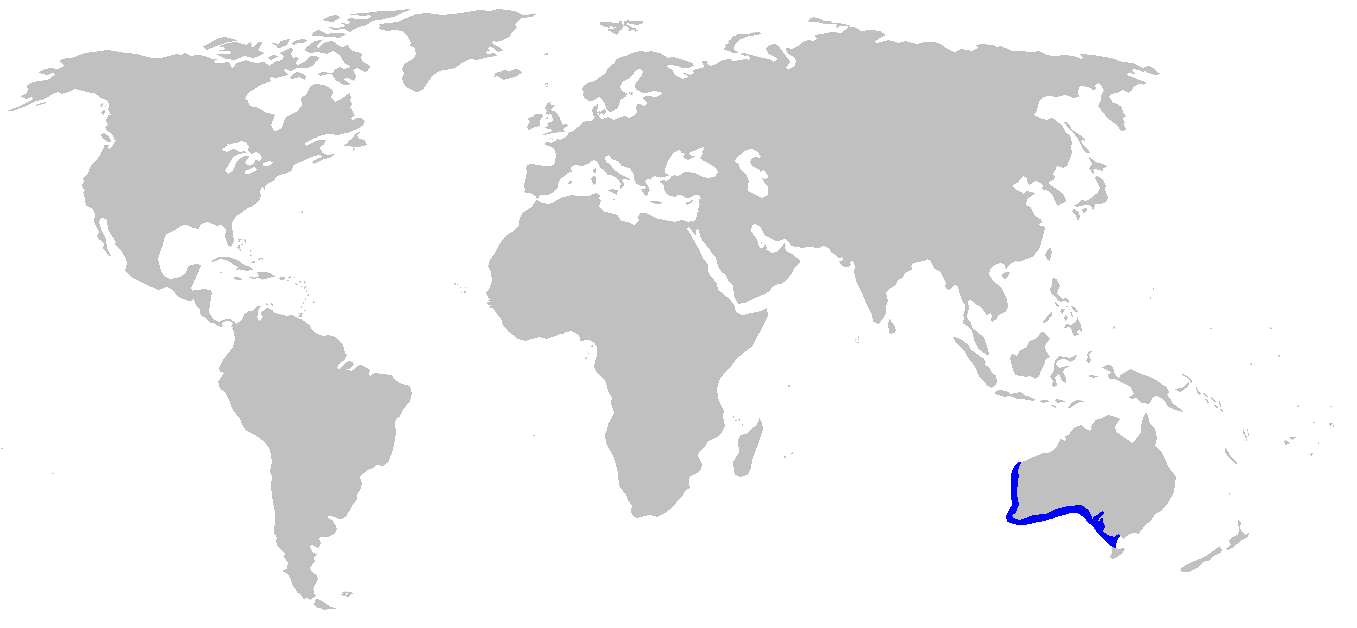
- Range of the whiskery shark

Synonyms
- Fur macki Whitley, 1943; Fur ventralis Whitley, 1943

Species of shark

The whiskery shark (Furgaleus macki) is a species of houndshark in the family Triakidae, and the only member of its genus. This common shark inhabits the Australian continental shelf from Western Australia to the Bass Strait, to a depth of 220 m (720 ft). It is demersal in habits and prefers rocky and vegetated habitats. Stout-bodied and almost "humpbacked" in form, the whiskery shark can be distinguished from all other members of its family by the presence of long nasal barbels. Its two moderately large dorsal fins are roughly equal in size. It is brownish gray above and lighter below, with a pattern of darker saddles and blotches in younger sharks. This species reaches 1.6 m (5.2 ft) in length.

The diet of the whiskery shark consists almost entirely of octopuses. It is viviparous; females bear litters of four to 28 pups every other year from August to October, after a gestation period of 7–9 months. This harmless shark is used for its meat, being one of the species marketed as "flake" in Australia. It is mainly caught by a Western Australian commercial gillnet fishery. Its numbers declined significantly from overfishing in the 1970s and early 1980s, leading to the introduction of new management measures in the mid-1980s. Since then, strict fishery management has kept the whiskery shark population stable or increasing, resulting in its listing as of least concern by the International Union for Conservation of Nature.

== Taxonomy and phylogeny ==
- - - - Hemitriakis
      - Furgaleus
    - - Triakis semifasciata
      - - Galeorhinus
        - Hypogaleus
  - Triakis megalopterus + Scylliogaleus + Mustelus

Phylogenetic relationships of the whiskery shark, based on protein-coding gene sequences:

Australian ichthyologist Gilbert Percy Whitley described the whiskery shark as a new genus and species, Fur macki, in a 1943 issue of the scientific journal Australian Zoologist. As the name Fur was already in use for the genus Fur of true flies, in 1951, Whitley replaced it with Furgaleus. The type specimen is a 50 cm (20 in) long immature male caught off Mordialloc in Victoria, Australia. Other common names for the whiskery shark include Mack's whiskery shark, reef shark, shakey shark, and sundowner. Sharks from the western portion of this species' range were once thought to be a separate species, F. ventralis, until comparative studies by Leonard Compagno found that they were not significantly different from F. macki.

Based on morphology, Leonard Compagno grouped Furgaleus with Hemitriakis, Iago, and Gogolia as the tribe Iagini within the subfamily Galeorhininae of the family Triakidae. A 2006 phylogenetic study by J. Andrés López and colleagues, based on four protein-coding gene sequences, affirmed that Furgaleus and Hemitriakis are sister taxa; the study was equivocal regarding the position of Iago and did not include Gogolia.

== Description ==
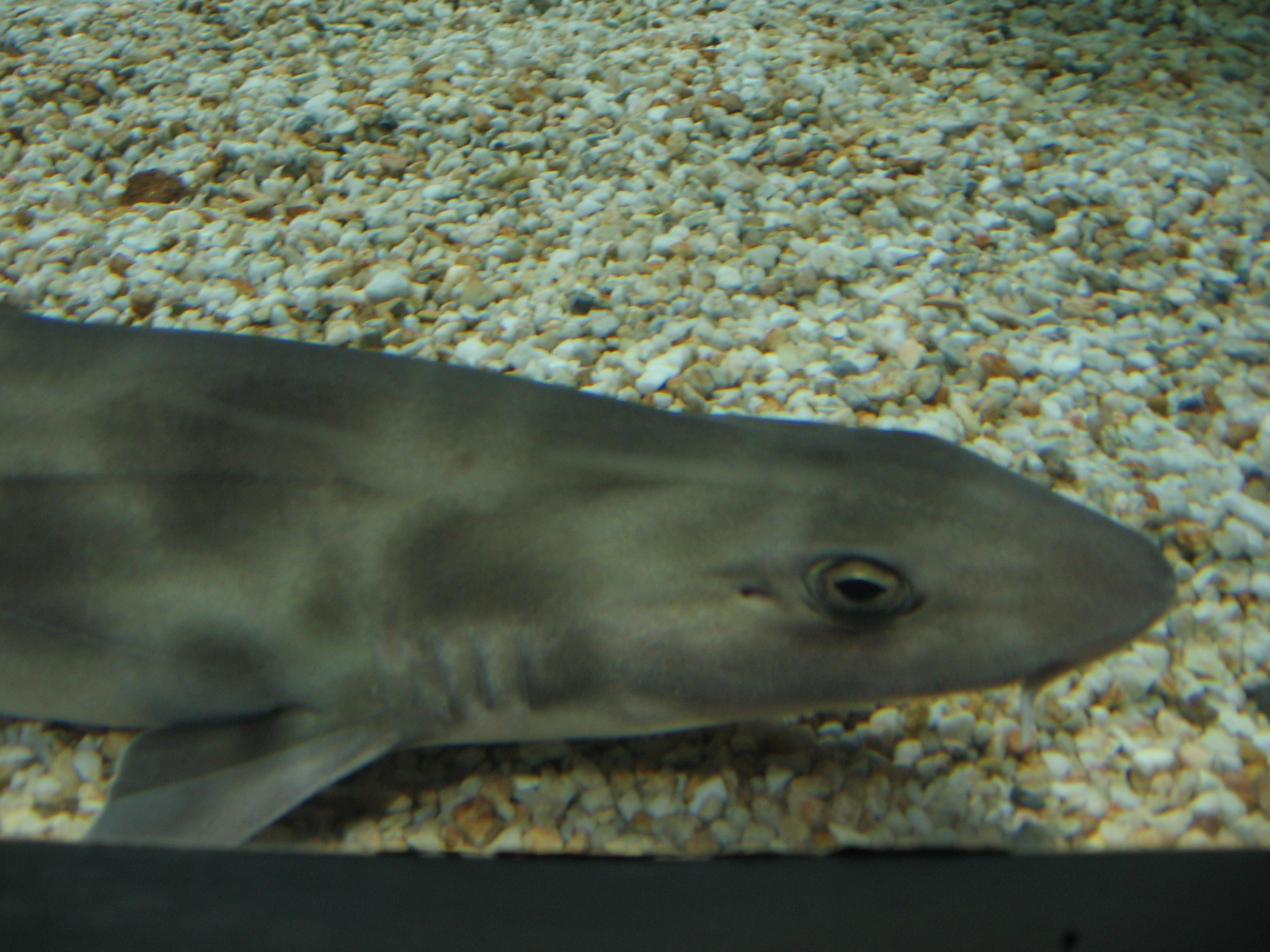
Distinctive traits of the whiskery shark include its nasal barbels and "humpbacked" profile.

The whiskery shark has a moderately stout build, with an almost "humpbacked" appearance. The short snout is rounded or wedge-shaped when viewed from above. This species is the only houndshark in which the flaps of skin preceding the nostrils are elongated into thin barbels. The horizontally oval eyes are placed high on the head and are equipped with rudimentary nictitating membranes (protective third eyelids). Beneath the eye is a prominent ridge, and behind it is a tiny spiracle. The mouth forms a short, wide arch, and bears somewhat long furrows at the corners. Tooth rows number 24–32 in the upper and 36–42 in the lower jaw. Each upper tooth has an angled, knife-like main cusp with smaller cusplets on the trailing side, while each lower tooth has a single upright cusp. Five pairs of gill slits are seen.

The first dorsal fin is rather large and positioned closer to the pectoral than the pelvic fins, though its origin lies posterior to the pectoral fin rear tips. The second dorsal fin roughly equals the first in size and is positioned slightly ahead of the anal fin, which is much smaller than either dorsal fin. The caudal fin has a short lower lobe and a deep ventral notch near the tip of the upper lobe. Adults are brownish gray above and lighter below; young sharks are lighter in color and have darker saddles and blotches over the body and fins, which fade and may disappear with age. This species grows up to 1.6 m (5.2 ft) long and 13 kg (29 lb) in weight.

== Distribution and habitat ==
Endemic to Australia, the whiskery shark inhabits temperate continental shelf waters from the North West Cape in Western Australia to Wynyard in Tasmania. It is most common in the southwestern portion of its range between Kalbarri and Albany, and is rare off Victoria and Tasmania. Its range seems to encompass a single population. This species is found close to the bottom at depths to 220 m (720 ft). It favors rocky areas and kelp beds.

== Biology and ecology ==
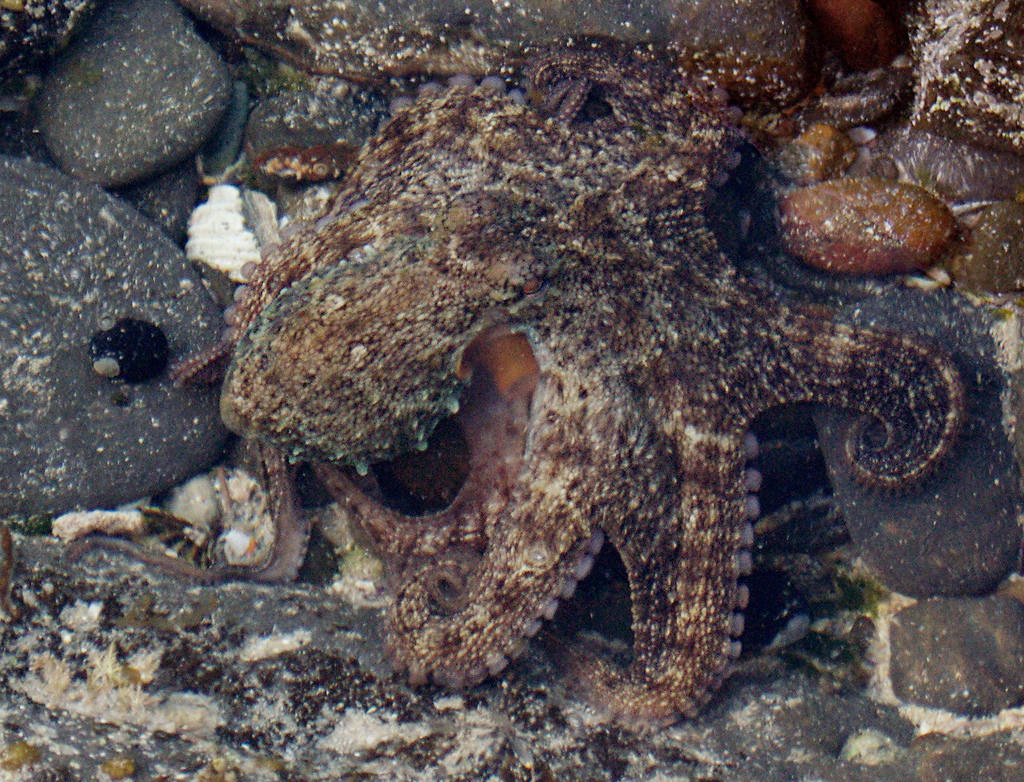
Octopuses are the predominant food source of the whiskery shark.

The whiskery shark is an active and highly specialized predator, feeding almost exclusively on octopuses. Other cephalopods, bony fishes, small rock lobsters, spoon worms, and seagrass have also been found amongst its stomach contents. A known parasite of this species is the tapeworm Calliobothrium pritchardae.

Like other houndsharks, the whiskery shark is viviparous; the developing embryos are sustained by yolk and probably also maternally produced histotroph. Males can mate every year, while females have a biennial reproductive cycle. Mating takes place in August and September; females store sperm until late January to early April of the following year, when the ova are ready to be ovulated into the uterus. After a 7– to 9-month-long gestation period, litters of four to 28 (average 19) pups are born between August and October. The litter size increases with the size of the female. The newborns measure 22–27 cm (8.7–10.6 in) long.

Juvenile whiskery sharks are rarely caught by commercial fishers, suggesting that nursery areas may be found in deeper water or other unfished habitats. Pups double to triple in size in the first 15–17 months of life, and continue to grow rapidly until they are 3–4 years old. Sexual maturity is attained at a length of 1.1–1.3 m (3.6–4.3 ft) for both sexes, corresponding to around five years of age for males and seven years of age for females. Mature sharks exhibit negligible growth rates, perhaps due to resources being diverted towards reproduction. The maximum lifespan is estimated to be 15 years.

== Human interactions ==
Harmless to humans, the whiskery shark is fished commercially for its meat, which is sold fresh. It is one of the shark species marketed as "flake". Along with the dusky shark (Carcharhinus obscurus) and the gummy shark (Mustelus antarcticus), it is targeted by a shark fishery operating off Western Australia, currently managed as the Western Australian Joint Authority Southern Demersal Gillnet and Demersal Longline Fishery. The fishery began in the 1940s with a small number of demersal longline vessels, though the whiskery shark was not caught in substantial numbers until the 1970s, with the introduction of monofilament gillnets, hydraulic net haulers, and additional vessels. Catches peaked in the early 1980s, when 400–600 tons were taken annually. Overfishing reduced the population to <30% of pre-exploitation levels by the mid-1980s, prompting the Western Australian government to enact a management plan that stabilized the population at 25–30% of pre-exploitation levels.

In 1995, the management advisory committee for the Western Australian shark fishery recommended that the whiskery shark stock be rebuilt to 40% of pre-exploitation levels by the 2010/11 season, through a series of fishing effort reductions. Although this target was not met because the effort reductions were not completed until 2000/01, preliminary catch per unit effort data indicate that the population is increasing. In 2004/05, this species made up 12% (153 tons) of the fishery by weight. The whiskery shark is also a minor catch of the southern shark fishery, which does not threaten the species overall. Since its population is stable and regularly monitored, and the fisheries that affect it are well-managed, the International Union for Conservation of Nature has assessed this species as least concern.
