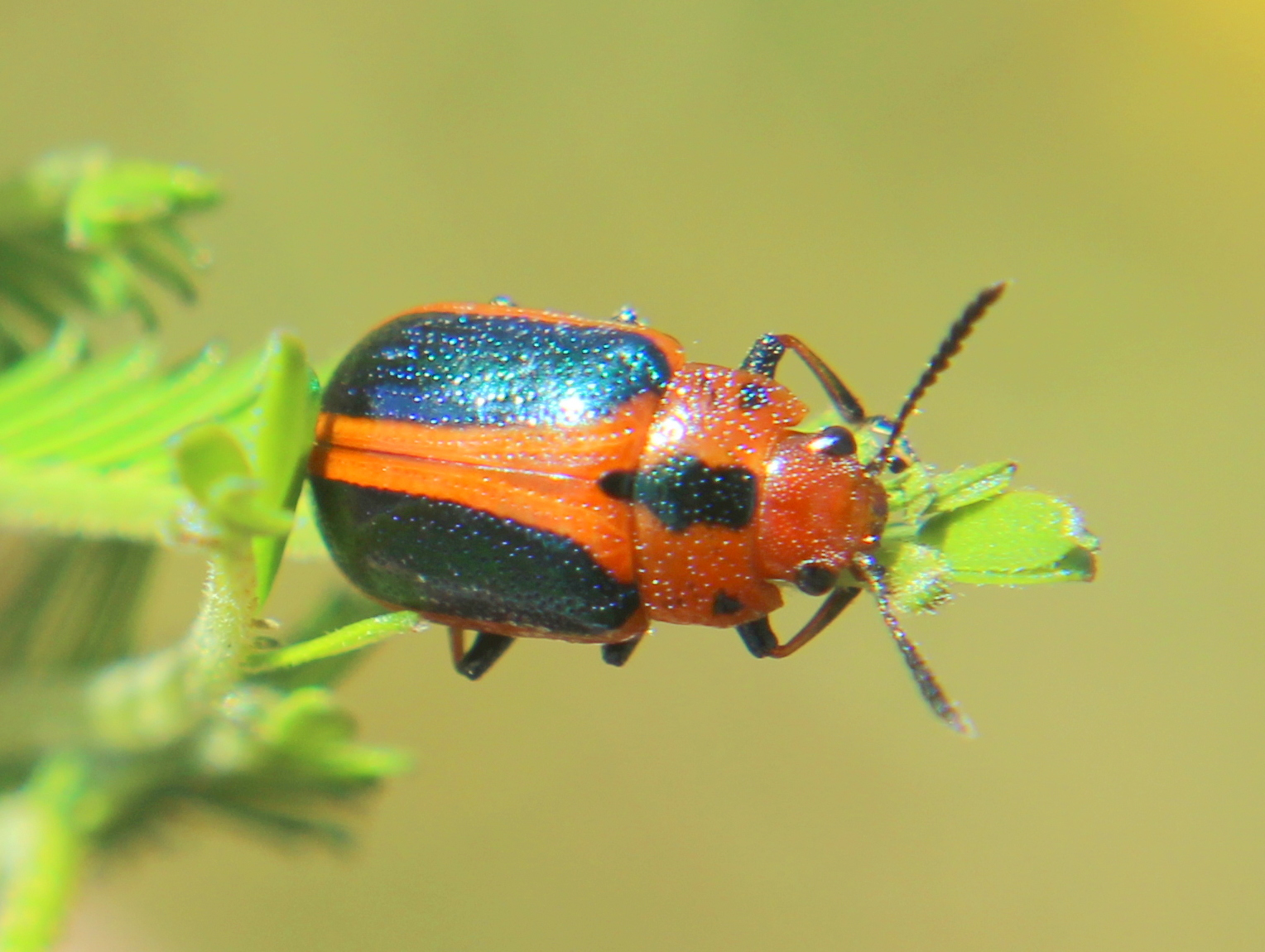
- Calomela curtisi

Scientific classification
- Kingdom: Animalia
- Phylum: Arthropoda
- Class: Insecta
- Order: Coleoptera
- Suborder: Polyphaga
- Infraorder: Cucujiformia
- Family: Chrysomelidae
- Subfamily: Chrysomelinae
- Genus: Calomela; Hope, 1840

Type species
- Chrysomela curtisi Kirby, 1819

Species
- See text

Synonyms
- Australica Chevrolat, 1836 (nomen oblitum); Callimela Agassiz, 1846 (unnecessary emendation); Calolina Lhoste, 1934; Carystea Baly, 1865; Lamecola Selman, 1976; Lamprotoptera Motschulsky, 1860; Paralepta Baly, 1878; Parastarycea Selman, 1977; Platysocia Lhoste, 1934; Pseudoparopsis Blackburn, 1899; Starycea Selman, 1977; Tetratica Motschulsky, 1860

= Calomela =

Genus of beetles

Calomela is a genus of beetles commonly called leaf beetles and in the family Chrysomelidae. They are specialist feeders on various species of Acacia and are not reported as a problem species. The beetles are cylindrical when compared with other leaf beetles and their larvae are globose. Calomela includes about 45 species which are found in all states of Australia.

== List of species ==
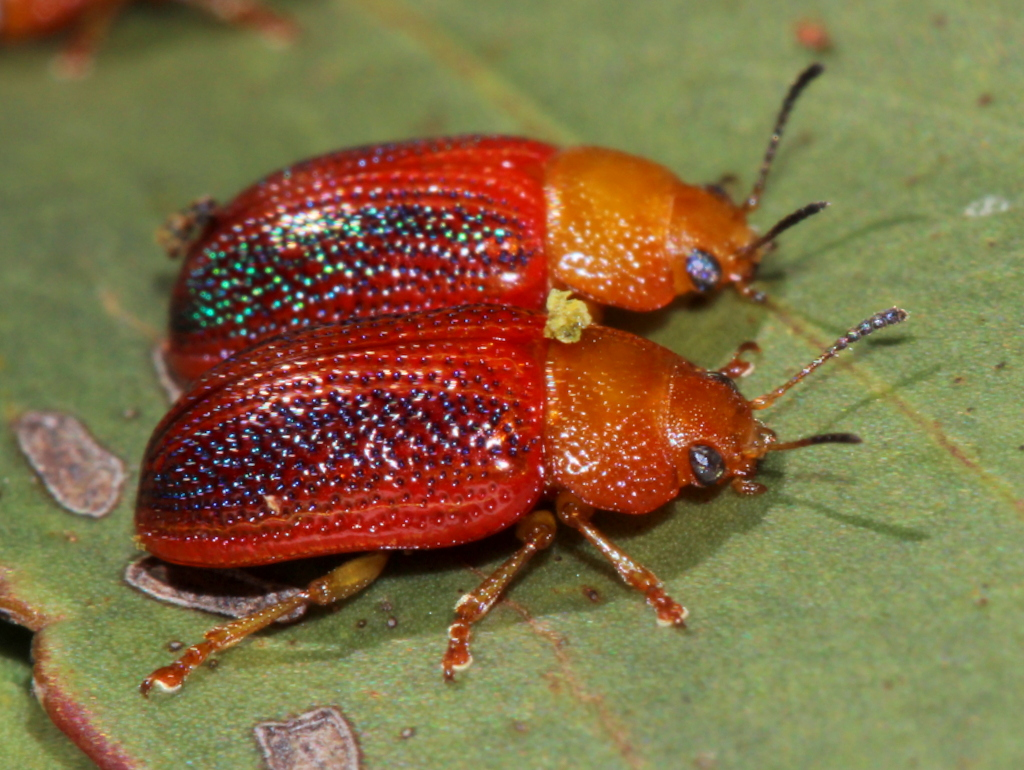
Calomela satelles

The genus includes the following species:

- Calomela acaciae (Lea, 1916)
- Calomela acervata (Blackburn, 1889)
- Calomela aeneonitens (Clark, 1865)
- Calomela apicalis Blackburn, 1889
- Calomela australica (Blackburn, 1893)
- Calomela bartoni (Baly, 1856)
- Calomela cingulata (Baly, 1856)
- Calomela colorata (Germar, 1848)
- Calomela crassicornis (Fabricius, 1775)
- Calomela curtisi (Kirby, 1818)
- Calomela distinguenda Blackburn, 1889
- Calomela eyrei Blackburn, 1890
- Calomela foveicollis (Baly, 1878)
- Calomela fugitiva Lea, 1903
- Calomela fulvilabris (Germar, 1848)
- Calomela gloriosa Lea, 1903
- Calomela imperialis Blackburn, 1893
- Calomela inornata (Baly, 1865)
- Calomela intemerata Lea, 1903
- Calomela ioptera (Baly, 1856)
- Calomela jansoni (Baly, 1865)
- Calomela juncta Lea, 1903
- Calomela laticollis Lea, 1916
- Calomela macleayi (Boisduval, 1835)
- Calomela maculicollis (Boisduval, 1835)
- Calomela micans (Baly, 1876)
- Calomela moorei Chu & Reid, 2018
- Calomela nigra Lea, 1903
- Calomela nigripennis Lea, 1903
- Calomela nitidipennis (Boisduval, 1835)
- Calomela pallida (Baly, 1856)
- Calomela parilis Lea, 1903
- Calomela picticornis Lea, 1929
- Calomela pubiceps (Lea, 1916)
- Calomela pulchella (Baly, 1856)
- Calomela regalis Lea, 1915
- Calomela relicta Reid, 1989
- Calomela ruficeps (Boisduval, 1835)
- Calomela satelles Blackburn, 1893
- Calomela selmani Daccordi, 2003
- Calomela sumptuosa (Selman, 1976)
- Calomela suturalis (Jacoby, 1885)
- Calomela tarsalis Blackburn, 1889
- Calomela testacea Lhoste, 1934
- Calomela vacillans Lea, 1915
- Calomela vittata (Baly, 1856)
- Calomela waterhousei (Baly, 1864)
