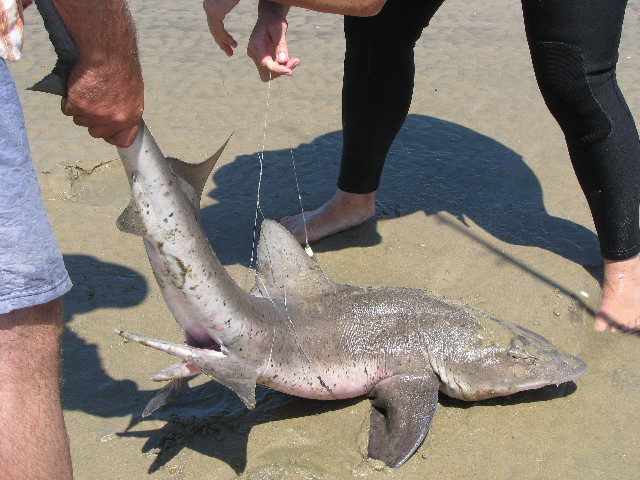

Conservation status
- Least Concern (IUCN 3.1)

Scientific classification
- Kingdom: Animalia
- Phylum: Chordata
- Class: Chondrichthyes
- Subclass: Elasmobranchii
- Division: Selachii
- Order: Carcharhiniformes
- Family: Triakidae
- Genus: Triakis
- Species: T. megalopterus

Binomial name
- Triakis megalopterus (A. Smith, 1839)
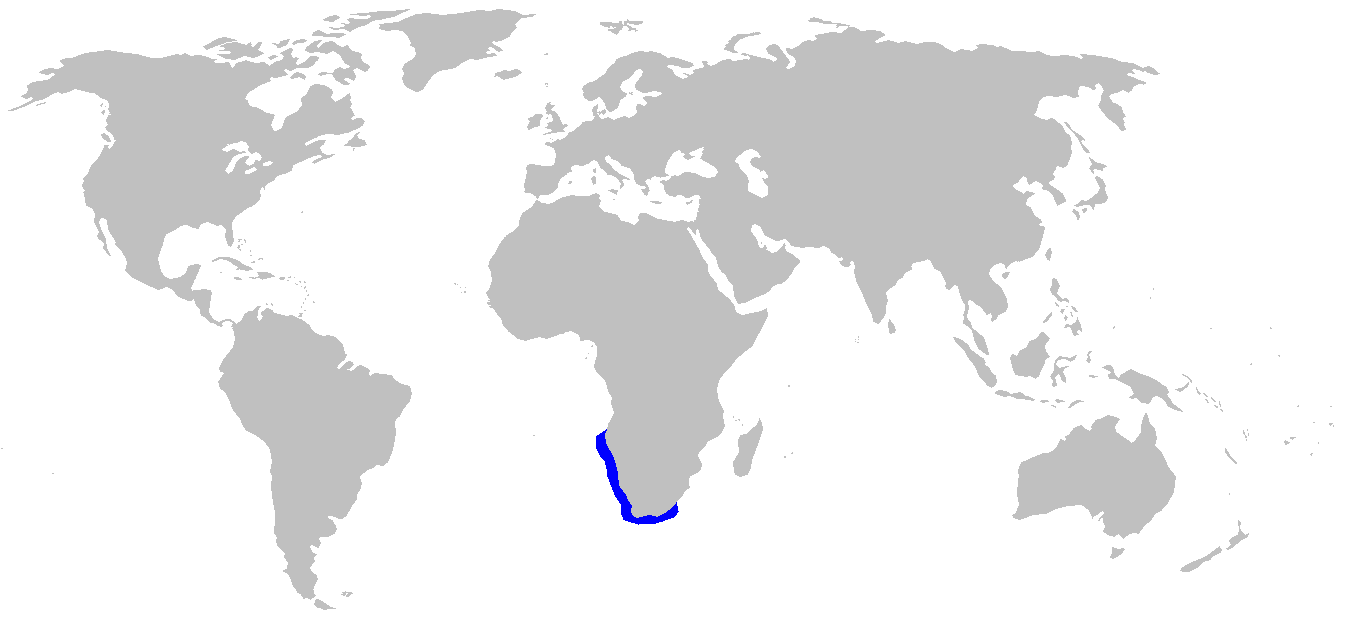
- Range of the sharptooth houndshark

Synonyms
- Mustelus megalopterus Smith, 1839; Mustelus natalensis Steindachner, 1866; Mustelus nigropunctatus Smith, 1952

= Sharptooth houndshark =

Species of shark

The sharptooth houndshark or spotted gully shark (Triakis megalopterus) is a species of houndshark in the family Triakidae found in shallow inshore waters from southern Angola to South Africa. Favoring sandy areas near rocky reefs and gullies, it is an active-swimming species that usually stays close to the bottom. This robust shark reaches 2 m (6.6 ft) in length and has characteristically large, rounded fins; the pectoral fins in particular are broad and sickle-shaped in adults. It also has a short, blunt snout and long furrows around its mouth. This species is gray or bronze in color above, with variable amounts of black spotting.

Mainly active at night, the sharptooth houndshark feeds mostly on crustaceans, bony fishes, and cephalopods. It has been observed gathering in groups in shallow water during summertime, possibly for reproductive purposes. This species is aplacental viviparous, meaning that the unborn young are sustained mainly by yolk. Females give birth to 6–12 pups between late May and August, on a 2- or 3-year cycle. The sharptooth houndshark is often hooked by recreational anglers, and some are also captured on commercial bottom longlines. Because of its small range and low growth and reproductive rates, it is very vulnerable to overfishing. The International Union for Conservation of Nature has listed this species as least concern.

== Taxonomy and phylogeny ==
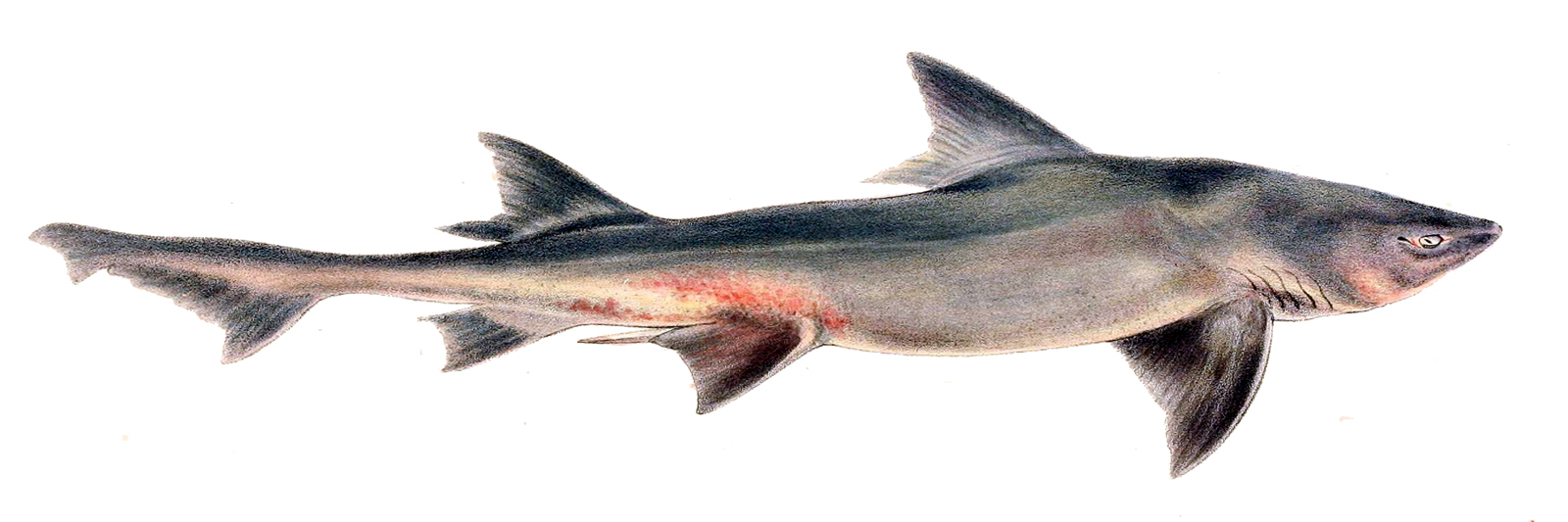
The illustration that accompanied Smith's original species description

Scottish zoologist Andrew Smith originally described the sharptooth houndshark as a species of Mustelus in 1839, as part of his work Illustrations of the Zoology of South Africa. His account was based on two specimens caught off the Cape of Good Hope, South Africa. Smith named the shark megalopterus, from the Greek mega ("large") and pteron ("wing"), referring to its large fins. Another common name for this shark is "sweet William".

Later authors have reassigned the sharptooth houndshark to the genus Triakis, more specifically to the subgenus Cazon alongside the sharpfin houndshark (T. acutipinna) and the spotted houndshark (T. maculata). A 2006 phylogenetic study by J. Andrés López and colleagues, based on four protein-coding gene sequences, found that this species did not group with the leopard shark (T. semifasciata). Instead, the flapnose houndshark (Scylliogaleus quecketti) and it formed a clade within the Mustelus lineage. This result suggests that the two subgenera of Triakis—Cazon and Triakis—may not be closely related, which would warrant a redefinition of the genus.

== Description ==
The sharptooth houndshark is a stout-bodied species with a short, thick, and blunt snout. The nostrils are widely spaced and preceded by lobe-like flaps of skin that do not reach the mouth. The horizontally oval eyes have ridges underneath and are equipped with nictitating membranes. The large mouth bears long, deep furrows at the corners, with those on the lower jaw almost meeting in the middle. The teeth are small and tightly packed to form pavement-like surfaces. Each tooth has a rounded, molar-like base that rises to a sharp, upright central cusp; rarely, a pair of barely developed lateral cusplets may also be present. Five pairs of gill slits are found.

The fins are distinctively large and rounded at the tips. The pectoral fins of adults are broad and falcate (sickle-shaped). The dorsal fins have nearly vertical trailing margins, with the first originating over the pectoral fin rear tips. The second dorsal fin is about three-quarters as high as the first. The anal fin is much smaller than the second dorsal fin and originates well behind it. The short, thick caudal peduncle lacks notches at the caudal fin origins. The caudal fin has a small but well-defined lower lobe and a longer upper lobe with a ventral notch near the tip. The skin is often loose. This species is dark gray to bronze above and white below. Young sharks are mostly unmarked, while adults vary from plain to densely covered with irregular black spots. It may reach 1.7 m (5.6 ft) in length and 40 kg (88 lb) in weight. Females grow larger than males.

== Distribution and habitat ==
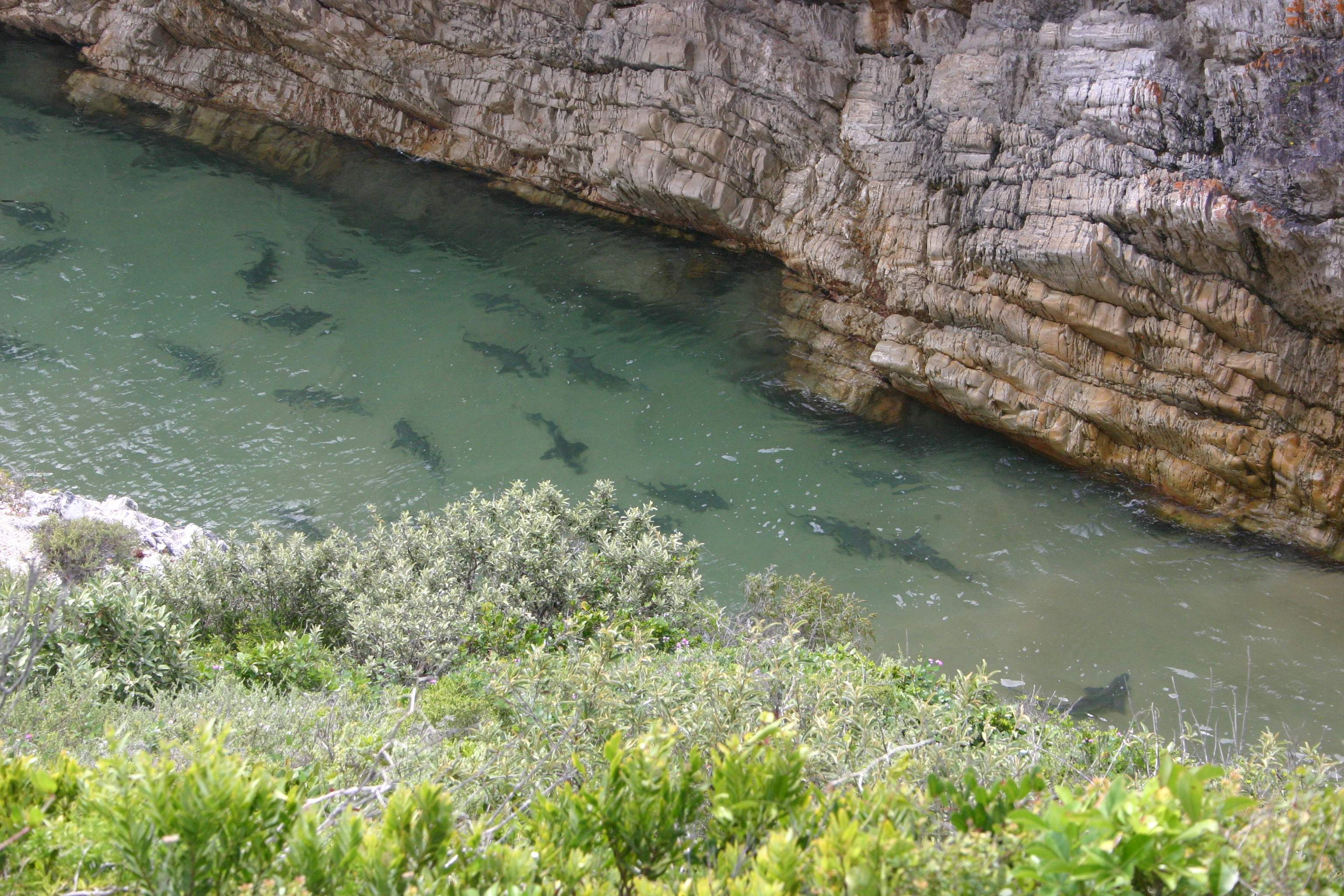
Sharptooth houndsharks gathering in a gully at Garden Route, South Africa

The range of the sharptooth houndshark is limited to the coastal waters of southern Africa, from southern Angola to the Eastern Cape (or rarely KwaZulu-Natal) in South Africa. This locally common species inhabits sandy habitats such as bays; it can be found from the surf zone to a depth of 50 m (160 ft), but the majority are found no deeper than 10 m (33 ft). It generally swims just barely above the bottom, favoring flat areas near rocky reefs or gullies, and seldom rises into open water.

== Biology and ecology ==
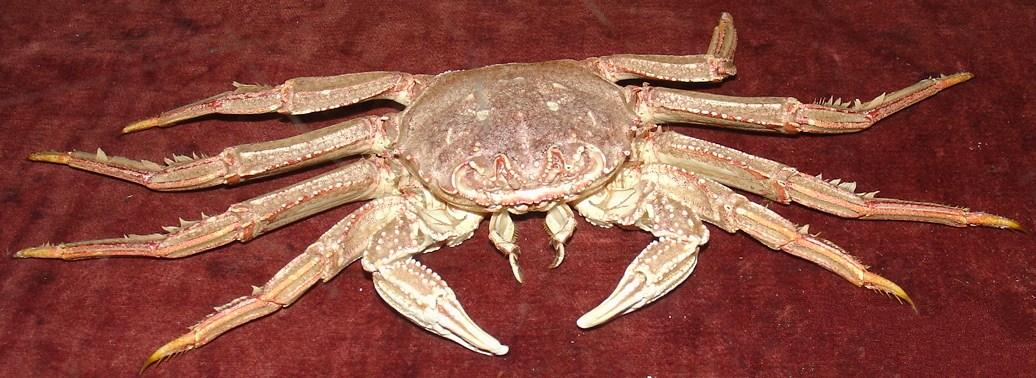
The crab Plagusia chabrus is the most important food source for sharptooth houndsharks off South Africa.

The sharptooth houndshark is a highly active species, though it can sometimes be found resting inside rocky crevices. It mainly hunts at night and has been known to pursue prey almost onto the shore. The pointed cusps of its teeth allow it to grasp slippery prey, while their broad bases allow it to crush hard-shelled prey. This shark feeds on a variety of crustaceans (crabs, slipper lobsters, and spiny lobsters), bony fishes (including morwongs, sea catfishes, drums, and porgies), and cephalopods (in particular Octopus vulgaris). Sharks and rays (including catsharks and guitarfishes) and their egg capsules are a minor food source for larger individuals. Off South Africa, the most important prey species is the crab Plagusia chabrus. Its dietary composition changes with age; young sharks under 1.0 m (3.3 ft) long subsist almost completely on crabs, while larger sharks consume more bony fishes and cephalopods, as well as a greater variety of prey overall. This shark has been observed deviating from its nocturnal habits to feed on chokka squid (Loligo reynaudii) during their mass spawnings. The broadnose sevengill shark (Notorynchus cepedianus) is known to prey on this species.

During the summer, the sharptooth houndshark forms groups in shallow water. These aggregations are particularly well-documented in False Bay and may be related to reproduction, given the presence of many pregnant females. It is aplacental viviparous, with the developing embryos nourished mainly by yolk. Mature females have a single functional ovary and two functional uteri. Litters of 6–12 pups are birthed between late May and August, following a gestation period of some 20 months. Larger females tend to produce larger litters. The length at birth has been variously estimated as 30–32 cm (12–13 in) and 42–44 cm (17–17 in) by different sources; pups within a single litter may vary in size by up to 30%. Females apparently reproduce either every two or three years, depending on whether she has ovarian eggs developing during the pregnancy that would allow her to mate again within a few months of giving birth. The sharptooth houndshark is a slow-growing species, with both sexes following a similar growth pattern. Males mature sexually at 1.2–1.4 m (3.9–4.6 ft) long and 11–13 years of age, while females mature sexually at 1.3–1.5 m (4.3–4.9 ft) long and 15–16 years of age. The maximum lifespan is at least 25 years.

== Human interactions ==
Harmless to humans, the sharptooth houndshark adapts well to captivity and has been displayed in public aquariums. It is frequently caught by recreational anglers from shore or ski-boats; it is edible but rarely eaten. Small numbers are also caught incidentally by a commercial demersal longline fishery targeting the school shark (Galeorhinus galeus) in the Gansbaai and False Bay region. The meat from sharks caught in the fishery is either made into biltong or jerky and sold locally, or exported fresh or frozen to Italy and Taiwan. Although in South Africa, the sharptooth houndshark is listed as a noncommercial species, thus cannot be harvested commercially, it is often mistaken for the common smooth-hound (Mustelus mustelus) by fishers. The International Union for Conservation of Nature has assessed the sharptooth houndshark as least concern. This species is highly susceptible to even moderate levels of fishing pressure, due to its restricted range, slow growth rate, and low fecundity. The fact that most sharks caught by fishers are immature is an additional source of concern.

== See also ==
- List of sharks
