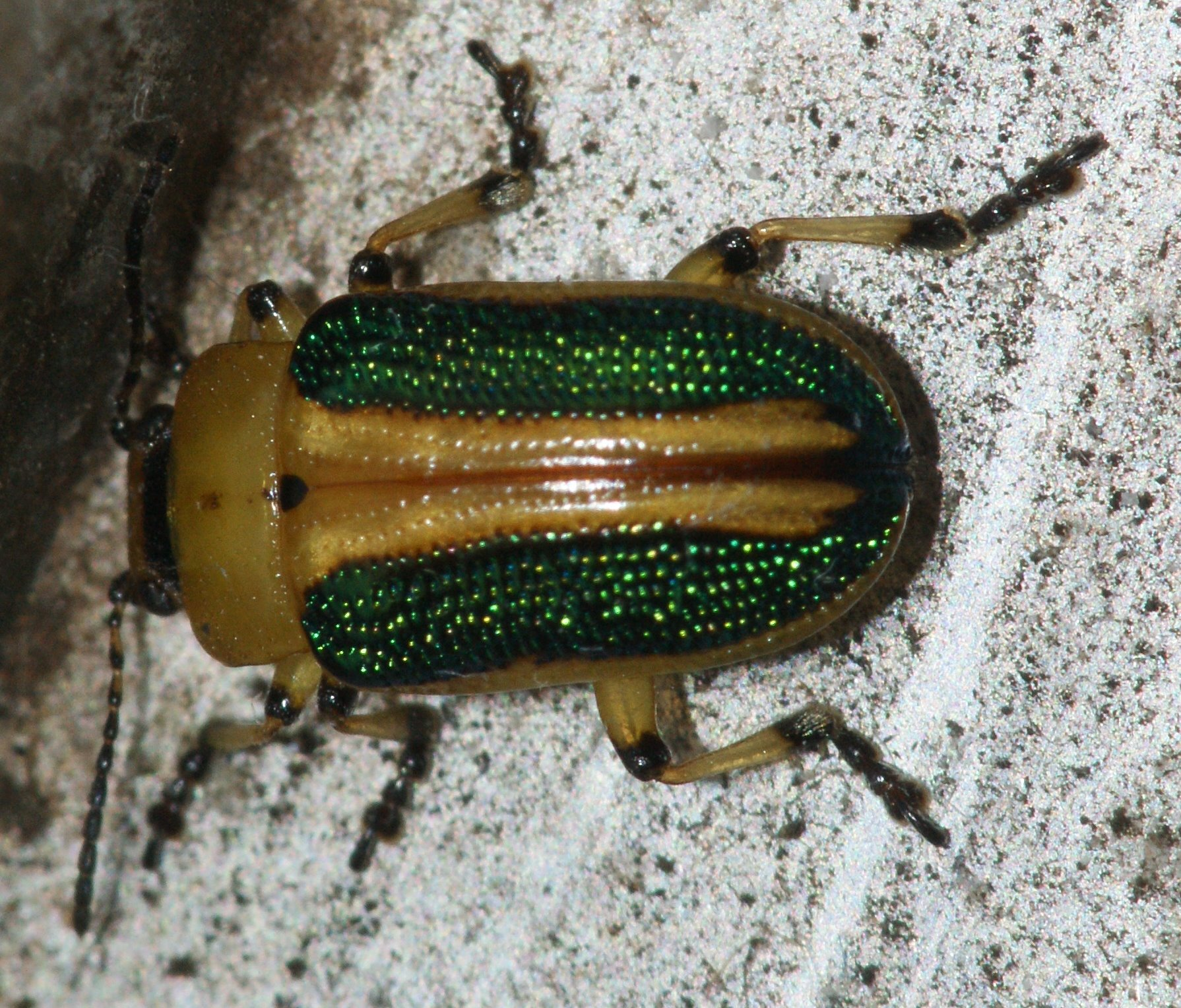

Scientific classification
- Domain: Eukaryota
- Kingdom: Animalia
- Phylum: Arthropoda
- Class: Insecta
- Order: Coleoptera
- Suborder: Polyphaga
- Infraorder: Cucujiformia
- Family: Chrysomelidae
- Genus: Calomela
- Species: C. bartoni

Binomial name
- Calomela bartoni (Baly, 1856)

Synonyms
- Australica bartoni Baly, 1856; Calomela nigricornis Lea, 1903

= Calomela bartoni =

Species of beetle

Calomela bartoni (common name Acacia leaf beetle) is a beetle in the Chrysomelidae (leaf beetle) family, which is found in New South Wales and Victoria.

It was first described by Joseph Sugar Baly in 1856 as Australica bartoni, It was redescribed as a new species, Calomela nigricornis by Arthur Mills Lea in 1903, but in 2006 Chris Reid judged these two species to be synonymous; the appropriate genus to be Calomela; and therefore, since Baly's description was prior to that of Lea the species name became Calomela bartoni.

== Ecology ==
Trevor Hawkeswood reports its larvae as feeding on Acacia decurrens.
