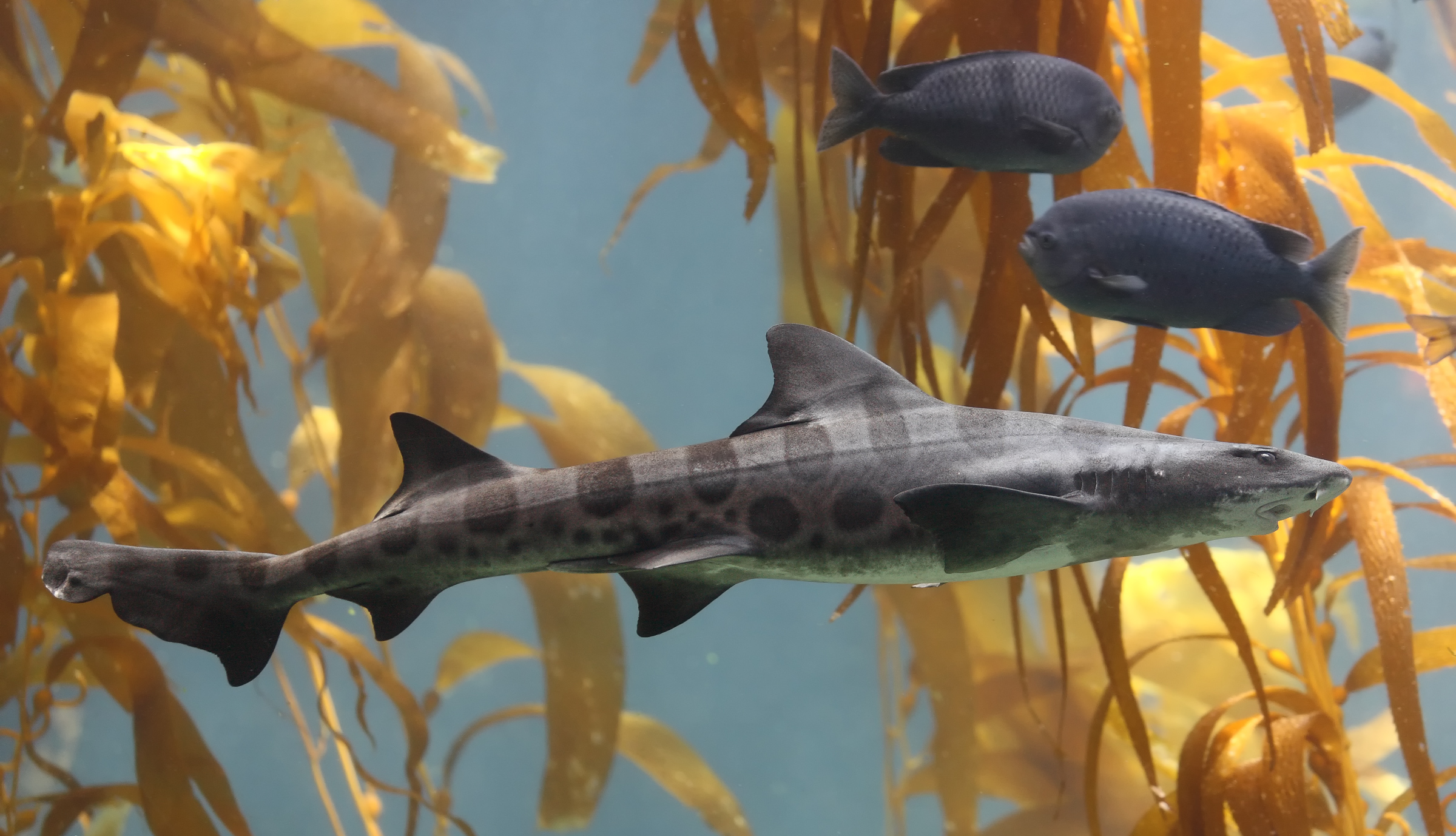
- A leopard shark and two blacksmith damselfish in Birch Aquarium

Conservation status
- Least Concern (IUCN 3.1)

Scientific classification
- Kingdom: Animalia
- Phylum: Chordata
- Class: Chondrichthyes
- Subclass: Elasmobranchii
- Division: Selachii
- Order: Carcharhiniformes
- Family: Triakidae
- Genus: Triakis
- Species: T. semifasciata

Binomial name
- Triakis semifasciata Girard, 1855
- Range of the leopard shark

Synonyms
- Mustelus felis Ayres, 1854; Triakis californica Gray, 1851

= Leopard shark =

Leopard shark Temporal range: Paleocene–Recent

Species of shark

The leopard shark (Triakis semifasciata) is a species of houndshark, in the family Triakidae. It is found along the Pacific coast of North America, from the U.S. state of Oregon to Mazatlán in Mexico. Typically measuring 1.2–1.5 m (3.9–4.9 ft) long, this slender-bodied shark is immediately identifiable by the striking pattern of black saddle-like markings and large spots over its back, from which it derives its common name. Large schools of leopard sharks are a common sight in bays and estuaries, swimming over sandy or muddy flats or rock-strewn areas near kelp beds and reefs. They are most common near the coast, in water less than 4 m (13 ft) deep.

Active-swimming predators, groups of leopard sharks often follow the tide onto intertidal mudflats to forage for food, mainly clams, spoon worms, crabs, shrimp, bony fish, and fish eggs. Most leopard sharks tend to remain within a particular area rather than undertaking long movements elsewhere, which has led to genetic divergence between populations of sharks living in different regions. This species is aplacental viviparous, meaning that the young hatch inside the uterus and are nourished by yolk. From March to June, the female gives birth to as many as 37 young after a gestation period of 10–12 months. It is relatively slow-growing and takes many years to mature.

Harmless to humans, the leopard shark is caught by commercial and recreational fisheries for food and the aquarium trade. This species is mostly fished in the waters off California where, after a period of population decline in the 1980s, new fishing regulations in the early 1990s reduced harvesting to sustainable levels. The International Union for Conservation of Nature has assessed this species as of Least Concern, while noting that local stocks may easily become overfished because of the shark's slow growth and limited migratory habits.

== Taxonomy and phylogeny ==
The first scientific name applied to the leopard shark was Triakis californica, coined by British zoologist John Edward Gray in the 1851 List of the specimens of fish in the collection of the British Museum. However, Gray did not furnish the name with a proper description, rendering it a nomen nudum. In December 1854, American ichthyologist William Orville Ayres gave a lecture describing the species as Mustelus felis, which included the first scientific description of the species. His lecture was reprinted first in The Pacific, a San Francisco newspaper, and then in the journal Proceedings of the California Academy of Natural Sciences. In April 1855, French biologist Charles Frédéric Girard published another description of this species, naming it Triakis semifasciata.

Despite M. felis being the senior synonym, an error in recording the dates of publication resulted in the widespread use of T. semifasciata as the leopard shark's scientific name. As a result of this long-standing error, Triakis semifasciata came to be recognized as the valid name (as a nomen protectum) and Mustelis felis was invalidated (as a nomen oblitum). The specific epithet semifasciata comes from the Latin words semi ("half") and fasciatus ("banded"), describing this shark's dorsal pattern of saddle-like markings. In older literature, this species may be referred to as "tiger shark" or "catshark".

- - - - Hemitriakis
      - Furgaleus
    - - Triakis semifasciata
      - - Galeorhinus
        - Hypogaleus
  - Triakis megalopterus + Scylliogaleus + Mustelus

Phylogenetic relationships of houndsharks, based on protein-coding gene sequences

The genus Triakis contains two subgenera, Triakis and Cazon. The leopard shark is placed within the subgenus Triakis along with the banded houndshark (T. (Triakis) scyllium). A 2006 phylogenetic analysis by J. Andrés López and colleagues, based on protein-coding genes, revealed that Triakis and Cazon are in fact not closely related, and additionally that the leopard shark may be the most basal member of its family.

== Distribution and habitat ==
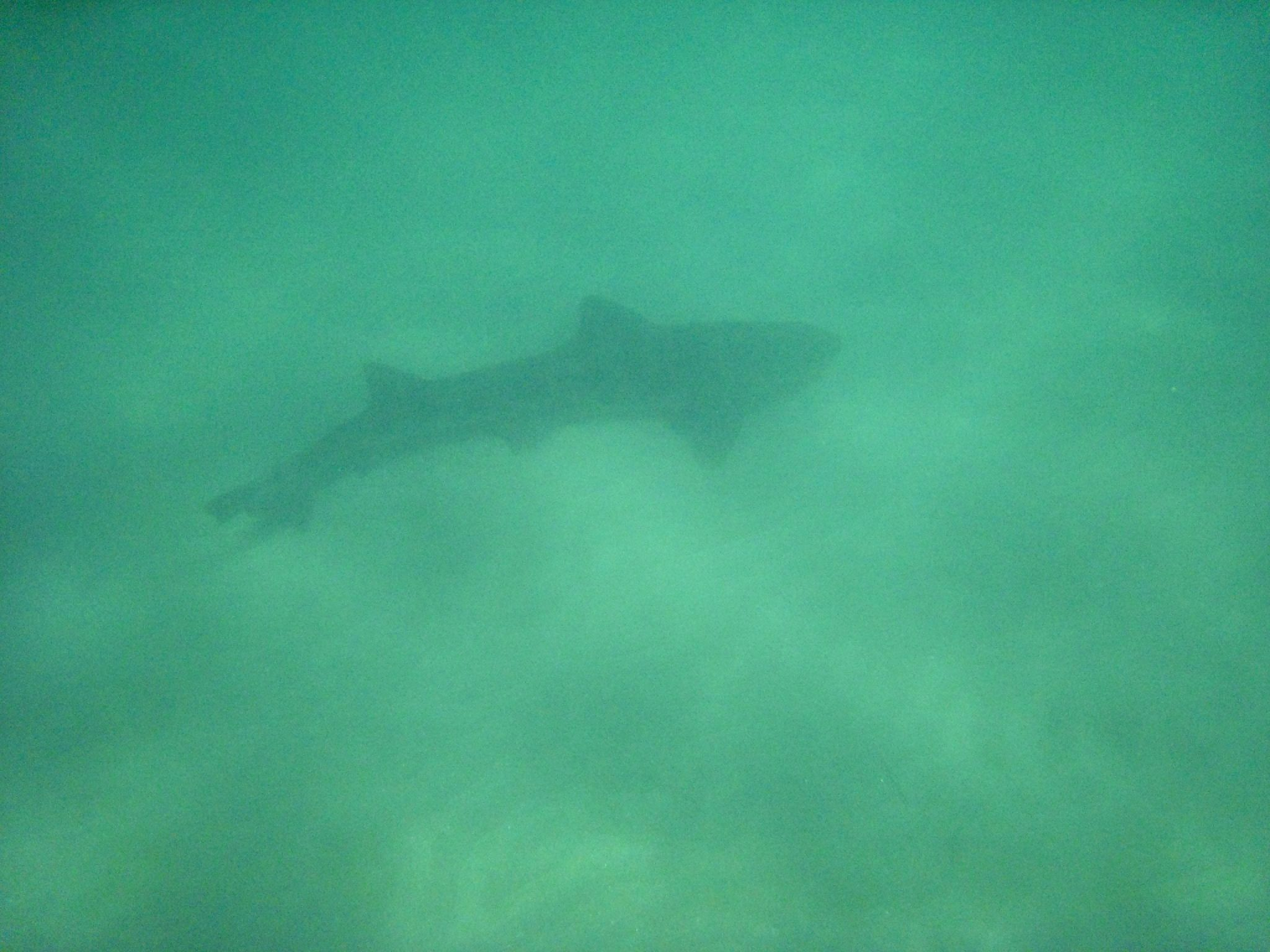
The leopard shark is often found over sandy flats.

The leopard shark occurs in the Northeastern Pacific Ocean, from the temperate continental waters of Coos Bay, Oregon, to the tropical waters of Mazatlán, Mexico, including the Gulf of California. It favors muddy or sandy flats within enclosed bays and estuaries, and may also be encountered near kelp beds and rocky reefs, or along the open coast. Numbers have been known to gather near discharges of warm effluent from power plants. Leopard sharks generally swim close to the bottom and are most abundant from the intertidal zone to a depth of 4 m (13 ft), though they may be found as deep as 91 m (299 ft). Many leopard sharks, particularly in the north, leave their coastal habitats in winter and return in early spring. A study in Tomales Bay in northern California determined that they depart when the water temperature drops below 10–12 °C (50–54 °F); one tagged shark was found to have swum some 140 km (87 mi) south.

While a few leopard sharks have been documented traveling hundreds of kilometers, most individuals tend to remain in a localized area for much of their lives. This low level of dispersal has led to genetic divergence across its range. Seven discrete gene pools have been identified along the Californian coast between Humboldt Bay and San Diego. Of these, the Humboldt Bay subpopulation is perhaps the most isolated, with the sharks there maturing at a larger size and producing fewer offspring than those from other areas. By contrast, the area around Los Angeles represents a genetic transitional zone between subpopulations whose boundaries are more diffuse. Off Baja California, the leopard sharks on the Pacific side are probably distinct from those in the northern Gulf of California. Although there is equivocal evidence for natal philopatry (returning to one's birthplace to breed) in this species, proximity to established breeding grounds likely contributes to the structuring of these different subpopulations.

== Description ==
The leopard shark has a moderately stout body, with a short, rounded snout. There are well-developed, triangular flaps of skin in front of the nares. The eyes are large and oval, with a nictitating membrane (a protective third eyelid). The line of the mouth is strongly curved. There are furrows at the corners of the mouth extending onto both jaws, with those on the lower jaw almost long enough to meet at the midline. The tooth rows number 41–55 in the upper jaw and 34–45 in the lower jaw; each tooth has a slightly oblique, smooth-edged cusp in the center and 1–2 small cusplets on either side. These teeth are arranged into a flat, "pavement"-like surface with overlapping ridges.

The large first dorsal fin is positioned about halfway between the pectoral and pelvic fins; the second is almost as large as the first and much larger than the anal fin. The pectoral fins are wide and triangular. The lower lobe of the caudal fin is well-developed in adults but less than half the length of the upper lobe, which has a strong ventral notch near the tip. The coloration is unique, consisting of prominent black "saddles" and large black spots running along the back, on a silvery to bronzy gray background. Adult sharks often have more spots and saddles with lighter centers compared to juveniles. The underside is whitish and plain. The average length of a leopard shark is 1.2–1.5 m (3.9–4.9 ft). Rarely males may grow to 1.5 m (4.9 ft) and females 1.8 m (5.9 ft), and there is a record of an exceptional female that measured 2.1 m (6.9 ft) long. The heaviest known leopard shark weighed 18.4 kg (41 lb).

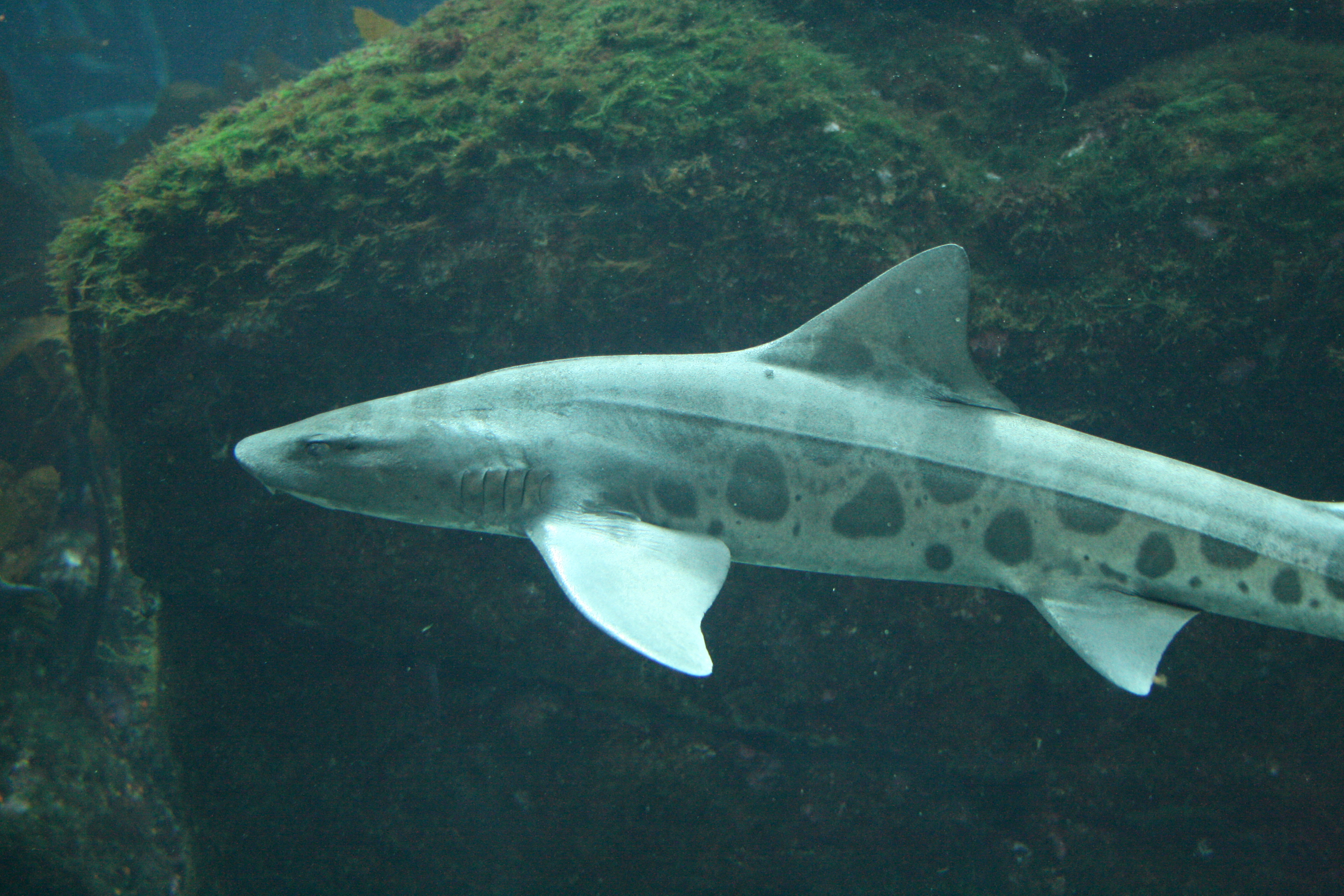
The dorsal color pattern of the leopard shark gives it its common name.

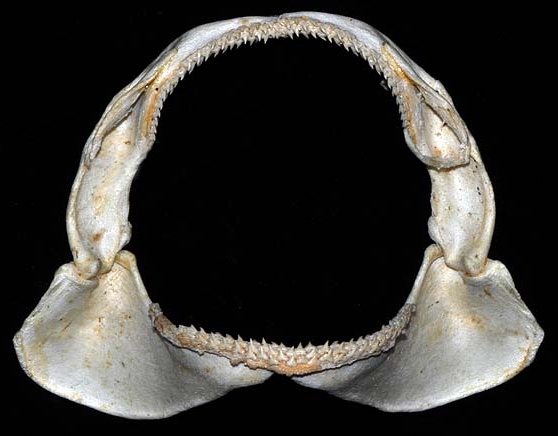
Jaws

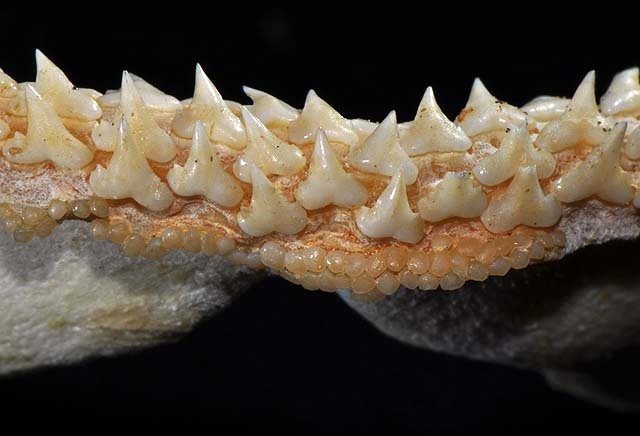
Lower teeth

== Biology and ecology ==
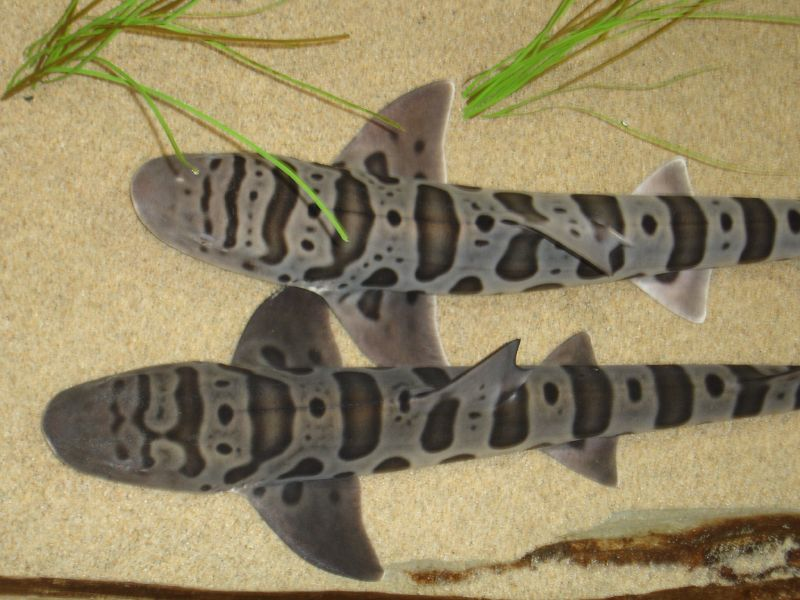
Leopard sharks are gregarious and associate with other individuals of similar size and sex.

An active species that swims with a strong undulating motion, the leopard shark is commonly spotted cruising in or just beyond the surf zone. It is more active at night than during the day, and sometimes lies still on the bottom. In Tomales Bay (among other similar regions), the leopard shark follows the tide onto mudflats to forage for food, retreating just fast enough to prevent being stranded or trapped as the water recedes. At Santa Catalina Island, resident sharks spend the day together in the shallows and at night, they disperse into deeper water, up to 10 km (6.2 mi) away.

From birth, leopard sharks form large schools, generally segregated by age and sex; these groups may intermingle with grey or brown smoothhounds (Mustelus californicus and M. henlei) and spiny dogfish (Squalus acanthias). These schools are apparently nomadic, often appearing suddenly in an area for a few hours before vanishing just as quickly. In captivity, larger sharks have been observed establishing their dominance over smaller individuals via light nips to the pectoral fins. During summer days, large aggregations of mature females assemble in shallow bays and estuaries, dispersing at night. As these females follow the warmest patches of water (allowing them to raise their internal body temperatures by up to 3 °C (37 °F), they are speculated to be taking advantage of the heat to speed their own growth and that of their gestating young. The membership of these aggregations is inconstant, with individual females periodically switching between different sites scattered over several kilometers.

Compared to the related grey and brown smoothhounds that share its range, the leopard shark has smaller and more numerous red blood cells, allowing it to process oxygen more efficiently. This may be an adaptation for foraging in deoxygenated estuarine environments. Their eyes contain very few cone cells, likely due to the murky water they inhabit. Small leopard sharks fall prey to larger sharks such as the great white shark (Carcharodon carcharias) and the broadnose sevengill shark (Notorynchus cepedianus). On one occasion, a sevengill shark was seen ambushing a leopard shark on a tidal mudflat in Humboldt Bay, striking with such momentum that the larger predator momentarily beached itself. Known parasites of this species include the tapeworms Phyllobothrium riseri, Lacistorhynchus dollfusi and Paraorygmatobothrium barber, as well as the copepods Echthrogaleus eoleoptratus and Achtheinus oblongatus.

=== Feeding ===
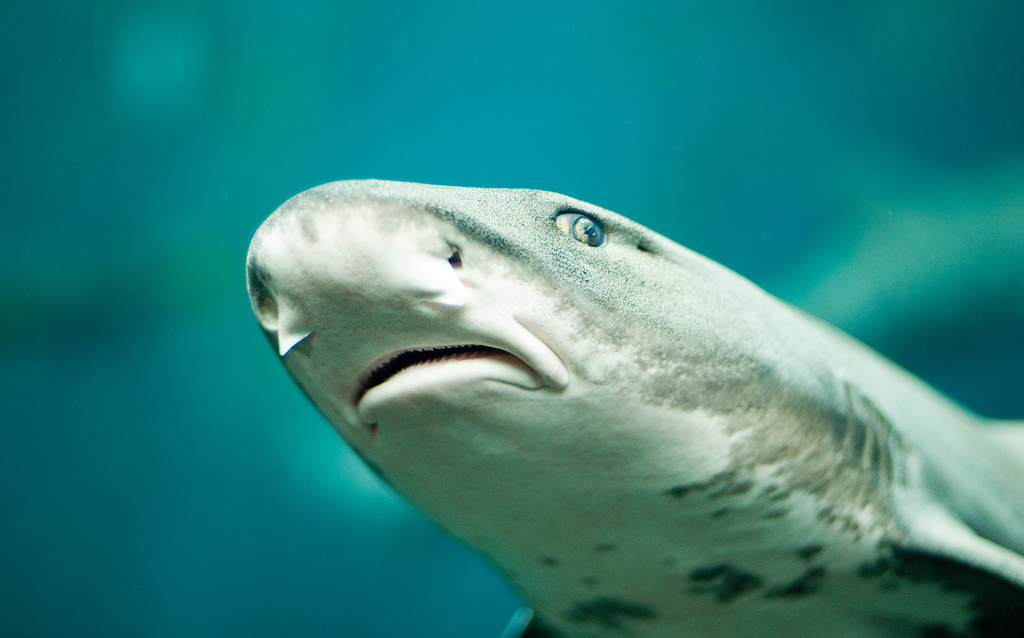
The leopard shark captures prey with a combination of suction and biting.

The diet of the leopard shark consists of small benthic and littoral animals, most significantly crabs (Cancridae, Grapsidae, and Hippoidea), shrimp, bony fish (including anchovies, herring, topsmelt, croakers, surfperch, gobies, rockfish, sculpins, flatfish, and midshipmen), fish eggs, clams, and the echiurid fat innkeeper worm (Urechis caupo). This opportunistic hunter has also been known to eat ghost shrimp, polychaete worms, and the young of smoothhounds, shovelnose guitarfish (Rhinobatos productus), and bat rays (Myliobatis californicus). Eelgrass (Zostera) and algae may be swallowed incidentally.

The leopard shark captures prey by expanding its buccal cavity to create a suction force, which is facilitated by its labial cartilages swinging forward to form the mouth into a tube. Simultaneously, the shark protrudes its jaws forward to grip the prey between its teeth. As with other sharks, the teeth of the leopard shark are periodically shed and replaced; it takes 9–12 days for a replacement tooth to move into position. Leopard sharks have been caught with stomachs filled with clam siphons, which the sharks seize before the clams can retract and break off with a levering motion of their bodies. On occasion, the shark tears the entire clam body out of its shell this way. Other sharks examined have had stomachs containing whole innkeeper worms with no bite marks, suggesting that the sharks sucked them out of their burrows. Under a hollow bridge support in San Francisco Bay, a group of leopard sharks and spiny dogfish have been observed feeding on a dense school of anchovies by slowly swimming counterclockwise through the clockwise-swimming school, and swallowing any anchovies that accidentally entered their open mouths. Leopard sharks are also known to use their nose as a shovel in order to reach prey that have burrowed underground.

In some places, this species feeds only on a few prey types and little else (e.g. innkeeper worms and cancrid crabs in Tomales Bay, jack silverside (Atherinopsis californiensis) eggs and the crabs Romaleon antennarium and Metacarcinus magister in Humboldt Bay). The predominant prey taken depends on location, time of year, and age. For example, in the Elkhorn Slough at Monterey Bay, cancrid crabs and innkeeper worms are mostly eaten in winter and spring, fish eggs from winter to early summer, bony fish in summer, and grapsid crabs and clams in fall. Young sharks feed mostly on crabs and transition to clam siphons, fish eggs, and innkeeper worms once they reach 70–80 cm (2 ft 4 in – 2 ft 7 in) long. The largest sharks are the ones that consume the most fish.

=== Life history ===
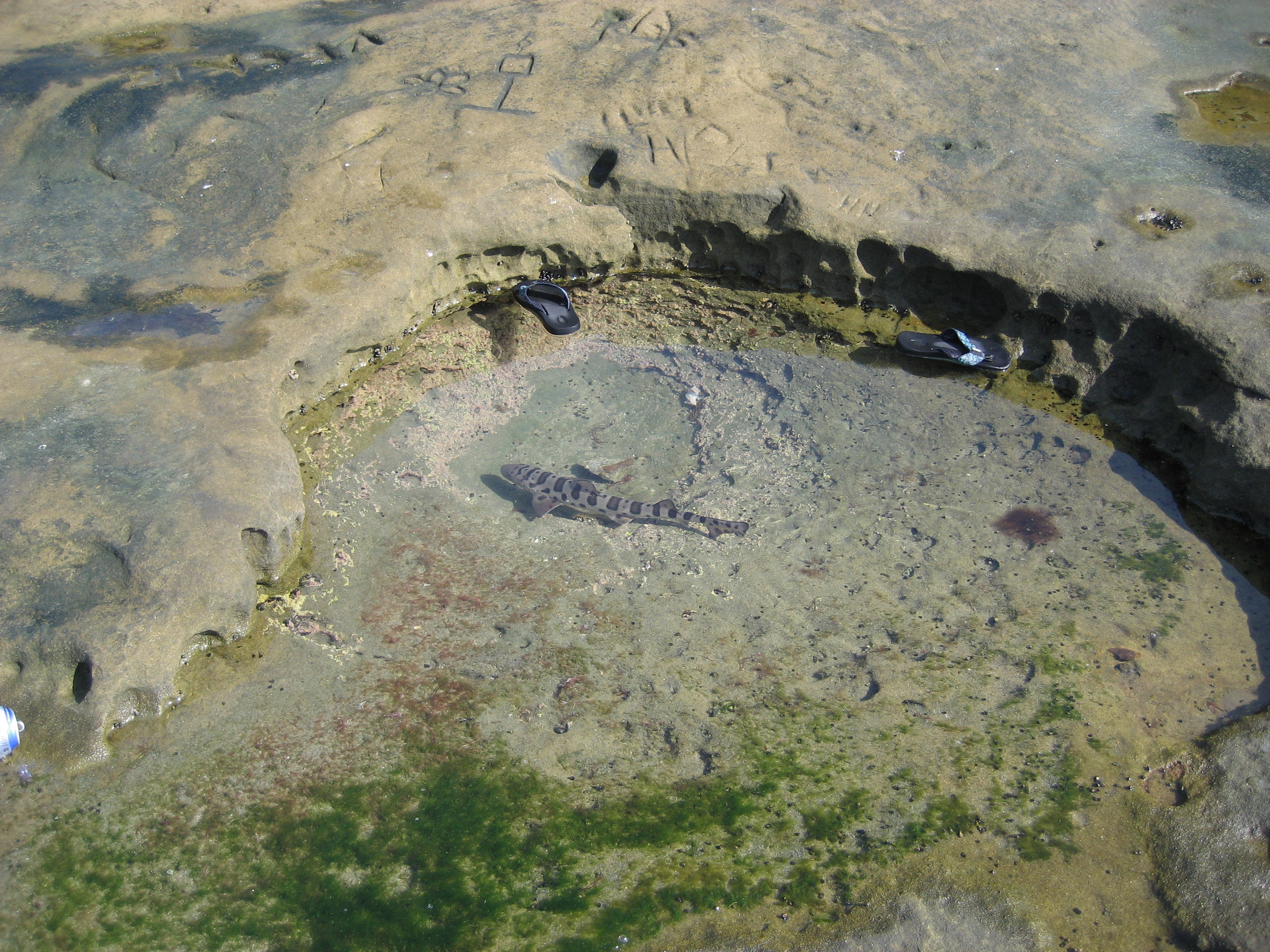
Young leopard sharks frequent very shallow, coastal waters.

The leopard shark is aplacental viviparous, with the developing embryos sustained by a yolk sac until birth. In northern areas, females use bays and sloughs as nursery areas, while to the south they give birth in more open areas. Known breeding grounds along the coast of California include Humboldt Bay, Tomales Bay, Bodega Bay, San Francisco Bay, Elkhorn Slough, Morro Bay, Santa Monica Bay (Los Angeles), Catalina Harbor (Santa Catalina Island), and San Diego Bay.

Females give birth to 1–37 young annually from March and July (most in April or May), with the number of pups increasing with female size. Multiple males may father a litter from a single mother In Humboldt and San Francisco Bays, females drop their pups in beds of eelgrass that provide both shelter and food. In Catalina Harbor, females give birth on flats in 1 m (3.3 ft) of water, their backs and dorsal fins exposed; the pups stay in even shallower water less than 30 cm (12 in) deep. Mating occurs in early summer following birth; the only known observation of this in the wild was in 2004 off La Jolla, amongst nine sharks gathered 19 m (62 ft) from shore in water 0.3–3 m (0.98–9.84 ft) deep.

Newborn leopard sharks measure around 20 cm (7.9 in) long. Relatively slow-growing after the first 3–4 years of life, male leopard sharks grow an average of 2.0 cm (0.79 in) per year, reaching maturity at an age of 7–13 years and a length of 0.7–1.2 m (2.3–3.9 ft), while females grow an average of 2.3 cm (0.91 in) per year, reaching maturity at an age of 10–15 years and a length of 1.1–1.3 m (3.6–4.3 ft). Individuals of the same age can vary significantly in size and large sharks are especially slow-growing: one specimen was documented to have gained only 4 cm (1.6 in) in length over 12 years. The maximum lifespan of this species is estimated to be 30 years.

== Human interactions ==
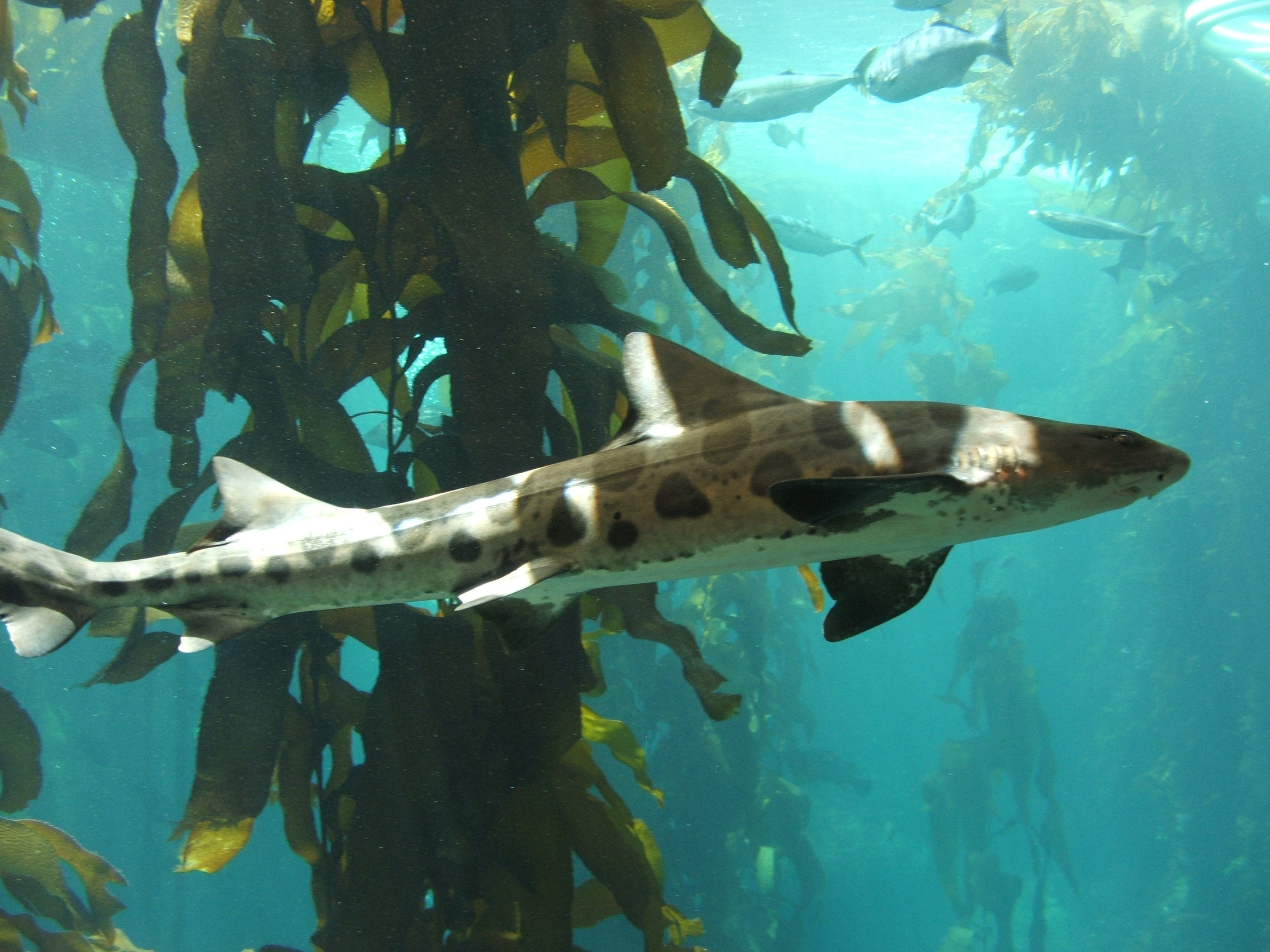
A leopard shark at the Monterey Bay Aquarium; this species adapts well to captivity.

Wary and quick to flee, leopard sharks pose almost no danger to humans. There was only one recorded incident which was in 1955 of a leopard shark harassing a skin diver with a nosebleed, though no injuries resulted. This species is caught by commercial fisheries using gillnets and longlines, and by recreational anglers and spearfishers; it is also caught as bycatch in bottom trawls. The meat is considered excellent eating and is sold fresh or frozen. However, leopard sharks living alongside human development may accumulate pollutants such as mercury, pesticides, and polychlorinated biphenyls (PCBs) within their bodies, and the California Department of Fish and Wildlife warns against eating them regularly. The leopard shark is prized by the aquarium trade for its attractive appearance and hardiness; this led to many newborn pups being captured with hook-and-line off southern California in the late 1980s and early 1990s. It may live for over 20 years in captivity.

Most of the fishing for leopard sharks occurs in the waters off California, where commercial landings peaked at 45,953 kg (101,309 lb) in 1983 and has averaged 14,060 kg (31,000 lb) annually since 1991. These figures are believed to be underestimates, as an unknown portion of the leopard shark catch is recorded simply as "shark". In recent decades the number of sharks taken recreationally has exceeded those taken commercially, with sport fishers catching an average of 52,000 sharks per year from 1980 to 1988, and 45,000 sharks per year since 1993. This species contributes negligibly to fishery landings off Oregon. The status of leopard sharks off Mexico is uncertain, although Mexican shark fisheries tend to focus more on larger species.

The International Union for Conservation of Nature (IUCN) has assessed the leopard shark as of Least Concern. It is highly susceptible to local depletion due to its slow growth rate and low level of exchange between regional stocks. It was considered for, but is not managed under, the U.S. Pacific Fishery Management Council's (PMC) 1982 Groundfish Management Plan. In 1992, the State of California imposed a recreational minimum size limit of 91 cm (36 in) and a possession limit of three fish, a move that was strongly supported and promoted by the sport fishing community. In 1993, the State also instituted a minimum size limit of 46 cm (18 in) for the commercial harvesting of all sharks and rays, including for the aquarium trade. In addition, Californian restrictions on the use of certain types of fishing gear in near-shore waters confer good protection to this shark's core population. These management measures seem to have successfully reduced fishing mortality and halted the population decline from the 1980s; the status of the leopard shark off California is regarded as secure, with demographic models estimating an annual population increase of 3–6% with sustainable fishing.

== See also ==
- List of sharks
