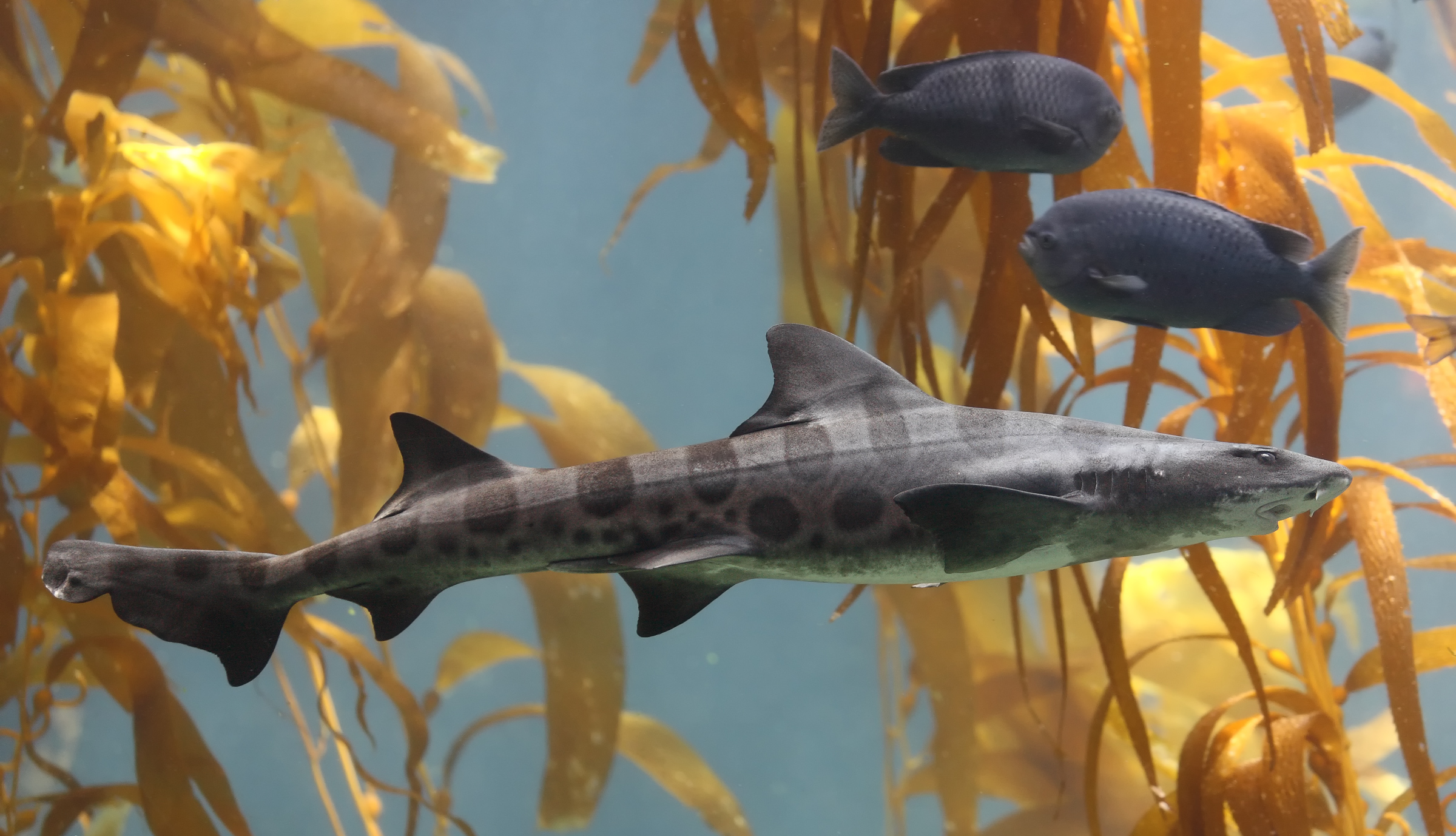
- Leopard shark (Triakis semifasciata)

Scientific classification
- Kingdom: Animalia
- Phylum: Chordata
- Class: Chondrichthyes
- Subclass: Elasmobranchii
- Division: Selachii
- Order: Carcharhiniformes
- Family: Triakidae
- Subfamily: Triakinae
- Genus: Triakis; J. P. Müller & Henle, 1838

Type species
- Triakis scyllium J. P. Müller & Henle, 1839

= Triakis =

Triakis Temporal range: Paleocene–present

Genus of sharks

Triakis is a genus of houndsharks in the family Triakidae. The name comes from the Ancient Greek word τρι- (tri-) meaning 'three', and the Latin word acis meaning 'sharp' or 'pointed', in reference to their three-pointed teeth.

== Species ==
Image	Scientific name	Common name	Distribution
	T. acutipinna Kato, 1968	sharpfin houndshark	coastal waters of Ecuador
	T. maculata Kner & Steindachner, 1867	spotted houndshark	eastern Pacific Ocean off the coast of South America
	T. megalopterus A. Smith, 1839	sharptooth houndshark	shallow inshore waters from southern Angola to South Africa.
	T. scyllium J. P. Müller & Henle, 1839	banded houndshark	northwestern Pacific Ocean from the southern Russian Far East to Taiwan
	T. semifasciata Girard, 1855	leopard shark	Pacific coast of North America, from the U.S. state of Oregon to Mazatlán in Mexico

== See also ==
- List of prehistoric cartilaginous fish
