= Flake (fish) =

Culinary term for certain shark species

Flake is a term used in Australia to indicate the flesh of any of several species of shark, particularly the gummy shark. The term probably arose in the late 1920s when the large-scale commercial shark fishery off the coast of Victoria was established. Until that time, shark was generally an incidental catch rather than a targeted species.

Flake rapidly became popular. It has a mild flavour, a soft texture that nevertheless remains well-defined after cooking, and a clean white appearance. A special advantage is that flake has no bones, because sharks are cartilaginous. Those qualities, combined with ready supply and a low price, saw flake become by far the most common type of fish to be served in Australian fish and chip shops. Flake remains popular, but it is no longer especially cheap.

Although the primary shark species sold as flake is the gummy shark, several others are listed below.

- Gummy shark, Mustelus antarcticus
- School shark, Galeorhinus galeus (critically endangered)
- Elephant fish, Callorhinchus milii
- Whiskery shark, Furgaleus macki
- Australian blacktip shark, Carcharhinus tilstoni
- Sawshark (any of several Pristiophorus species)
- Various dog sharks (family Squalidae), including the endangered greeneye spurdog
- Wobbegong (family Orectolobidae)
- Scalloped hammerhead, Sphyrna lewini (critically endangered)

Notably, an estimated 10% of fillets sold as flake originate from an endangered species, and a further 70% are mislabeled. This mislabeling often masks the presence of these threatened species.

During the late 1960s, it became apparent that larger individuals of several shark species were contaminated with high levels of heavy metals, particularly mercury, and a public outcry eventually led to the Victorian government banning the sale of large school sharks between 1972 and 1985.

In Britain, nursehound is often sold as flake.
