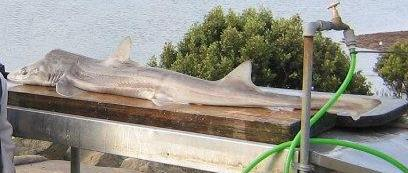
- Gummy shark caught in Hastings, Western Port, Victoria

Conservation status
- Least Concern (IUCN 3.1)

Scientific classification
- Kingdom: Animalia
- Phylum: Chordata
- Class: Chondrichthyes
- Subclass: Elasmobranchii
- Division: Selachii
- Order: Carcharhiniformes
- Family: Triakidae
- Genus: Mustelus
- Species: M. antarcticus

Binomial name
- Mustelus antarcticus Günther, 1870
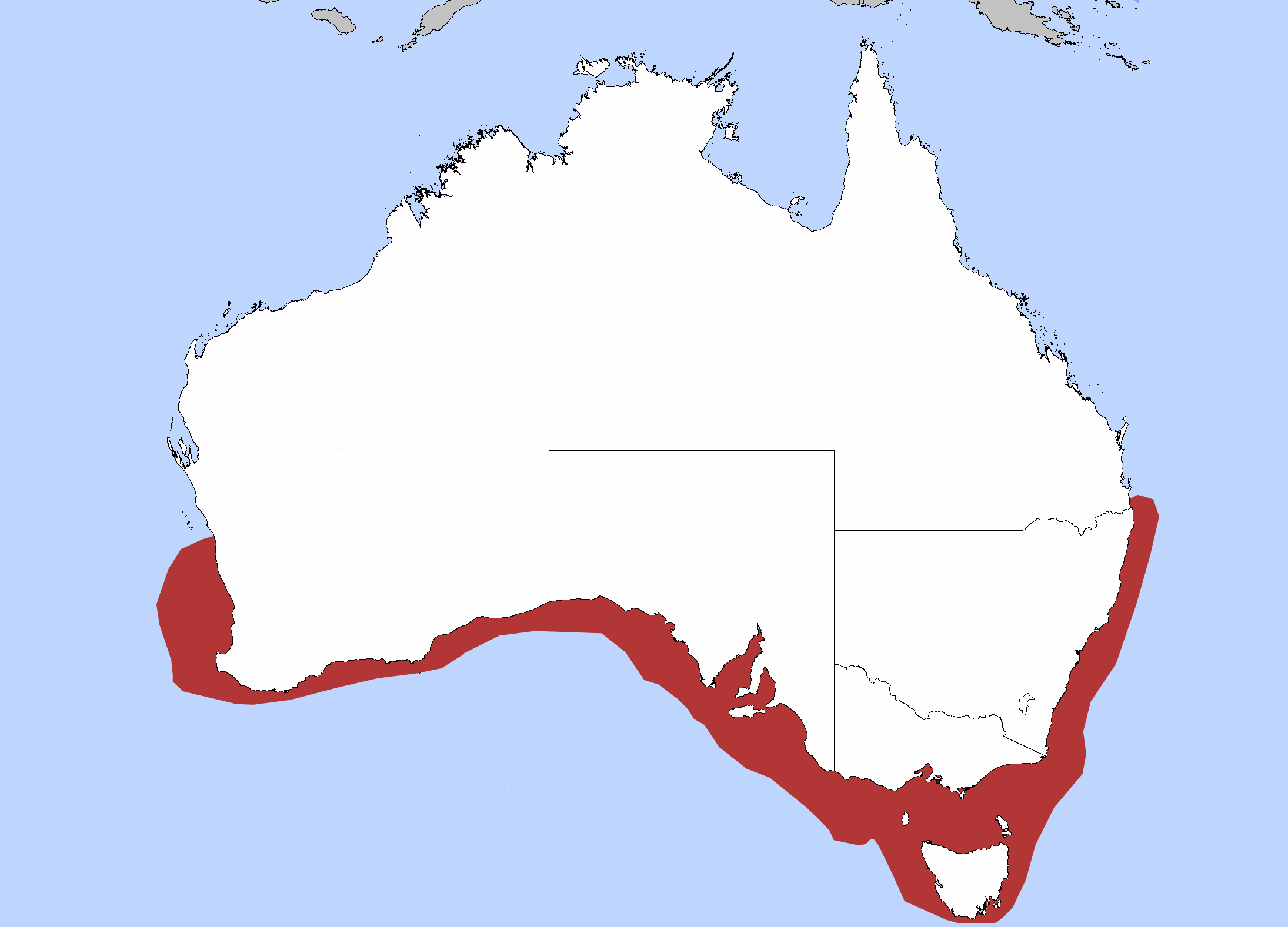
- Common distribution for Gummy shark in southern Australia

Synonyms
- Mustelus walkeri (eastern spotted gummy shark) W. T. White & Last, 2008

= Gummy shark =

Species of shark

The gummy shark (Mustelus antarcticus), also known as the Australian smooth hound, flake, sweet william or smooth dog-shark, is a species of ground shark in the genus Mustelus of the family Triakidae. These small to medium-sized bottom-dwelling sharks are found mostly in, but are not limited to, the area around the southern seas of Australia and are commonly baited and fished for cuisine because of its taste and market prices. According to a 2021 paper by White, Arunrugstichai & Naylorn (2021), Mustelus walkeri (eastern spotted gummy shark) is the same animal as M. antarcticus. One theory is that M. walkeri is a subpopulation of M. antarcticus.

== Appearance ==
This species is a slender shark with a darker grey top with white spots and a silvery-white underbelly. The gummy shark gets its name from its flat, plate-like teeth which it uses to crush its shelled and non-shelled prey, giving its jaws the superficial appearance of toothlessness. Jaw weight in gummy sharks is thought to reflect the age of the shark. Elements such as calcium and phosphorus are involved in the calcification of jaw cartilage, which can be measured. Those measurements, along with the shark's size, can help determine its age.

Male gummy sharks can reach a maximum length of 157 cm (62 in) and females can reach up to 175 cm (69 in). The minimum size of a grown male or female is 45 cm (18 in). At birth, gummy sharks measure between 30 and 35 cm (12 and 14 in). Measurements are taken from the rear-most gill slit to the base of the tail fin. However, Mustelus antarcticus appears to grow at varied rates in different areas. In Central Queensland, where fishing mortality is low, gummy sharks exhibit slower growth rates than in southern Australia. Researchers have found that female gummy sharks grow more slowly, leading to them becoming larger than males. That attribute is shared among elasmobranchs. Growing to the maximum size is an advantage for reproduction and survival. Sharks in other regions may grow faster as preservation against fisheries and predation by other animals. However, that rapid growth can result in a smaller adult size and differences in developmental traits.

== Hunting and habitat ==
The gummy shark feeds on crustaceans, marine worms, small fish, and cephalopods such as octopus, squid and cuttlefish. It uses its plate-like teeth to help it crush the shells and bodies of its prey for easier consumption. The gummy shark remains on or near the sea beds, and their travel patterns vary on age. Juvenile gummy sharks will travel less than full-grown species. The females tend to travel longer ranges compared to males. Gummy sharks are primarily found to live in sandy areas and will come closer to shores during the night in search of prey.

== Geography ==
The gummy shark is primarily found living on the southern coast of Australia around Bunbury including but not limited to the island of Tasmania and the Bass Strait. Gummy sharks are also found in coastal areas of the Pacific Ocean such as Japan, as well as coastal areas of the Indian Ocean.

== Segregation patterns ==
Gummy sharks exhibit strong sexual segregation on a large scale. This is a common trait in sharks that is shown with different degrees of segregation. They are usually segregated by sex and size. Gummy sharks are no exception to this; they do it quite abundantly. Mustelus antarcticus found in Western Australia were segregated by sex. The females predominantly occurred in the west and southwest of Western Australia. However, the males tended to stay in the southeast territory. Several factors contribute to this segregation. Female gummy sharks can be found in the west and southwest of Western Australia due to the prime habitat for breeding and feeding. It also provides a nursery for gestational sharks. Moreover, depth seems to play a role in the southeastern region for males in this niche. It was found that males tend to decrease with the depth in this area. Some factors that could play into this are refuge from mating, intraspecific competition, differences in prey availability, and energetic requirements.

== Reproductive tendencies ==
Gummy sharks are found to be mostly bottom dwellers in the waters around southern Australia, from Shark Bay in Western Australia to Port Stephens in New South Wales, from the surface down to a depth of 350 m (1,150 ft) in moderate-temperature water. The reproduction of the single-sex school gummy sharks is ovoviviparous. Ovoviviparous organisms are those who produce young via egg which are then hatched inside of the parents' bodies. A common example of an ovoviviparous animal is a seahorse. An additional advantage that Mustelus antarcticus has is polyandry, which allows females to mate with multiple males. This type of mating is especially beneficial to avoid inbreeding and increase genetic diversity. This gives their juveniles an increase in survival rate. In female gummy sharks, sperm has been detected in both maturing and mature females. They can store sperm up to one year prior to first ovulation. The sperm is stored in sperm storage tubules of the terminal zone in the oviducal gland structure. However, it can also be found in other parts of the reproduction track. The sperm can migrate and is found in the uterine sphincter (a muscular structure that regulates the passing of urine from the bladder into the urethra) and the body of the uterus. It can potentially be stored for up to 13 months or longer. Research has shown that the quantity of retention of sperm is not based solely on reproduction cycles or stages of maturity. This is especially important when calculating the fertilization time to estimate the future reproductive capacity of the population. Gummy sharks have a biennial reproduction cycle (two years), which could be due to females mating prior to first ovulation. Additionally, they can mate during pregnancy and following parturition, allowing for flexible reproduction. Gummy sharks have an ovulation and mating period that lasts about three months from November–February. The gestation period in this species is between eleven and twelve months. The embryos can get to be thirty to thirty-six centimeters total in length. Pregnant gummy sharks will rely on inshore nursery areas such as a bay or sheltered space close to shore to have her pups. Females can have up to 57 pups per litter and are ready to do so by the age of five. The average number of pups per litter birthed by the female Mustelus antarcticus is 14 but can have up to 57. The sex ratio in the embryos is 1:1. Male sharks are ready to reproduce by the age of four. Additionally, the males provide no parental care for the juveniles. All parental care is done by the mother. The typical generation length for the gummy shark is 10 years and have an average life expectancy of 16 years.

== Predators and human interaction ==
Mustelus antarcticus pose no known threat to beachgoers or fisherman. Because of gummy sharks' bottom-dwelling habitat, they have minimal contact with humans, and they tend to flee when spotted, hence why observational studies of this species is difficult. Gummy sharks have only two known predators. One is humans, who catch them for consumption and sport fishing. The other main predator is the broadnose sevengill shark, which preys on juveniles that remain close to shallow waters.

== Fishing and consumption ==
Gummy sharks are one of the more highly targeted fish for human consumption. Southern Australia is the biggest contender for this, with an annual harvest of 1,814.3 tonnes in the 2021–22 fishing season. Gummy shark meat is often marketed as "flake" in southern Australia. Their boneless fillets have made them particularly popular within the fish and chips industry throughout Australia.^{[1]} Although gummy sharks have not been over-fished, they inhabit many of the same areas as school (snapper) sharks which have an established bycatch quota. This means fishers targeting gummy shark can have an adverse impact on the school shark population.^{[2]} Due to new fishing gear, the growth rate of gummy sharks between three and seven years of age have decreased. However, gummy sharks around the age of two are least affected by fisheries. This species is also of least concern in terms of endangerment according to the IUCN Red List, which is an extensive list of species that organizes where they fall on the endangered scale from "least concern" (LC) to "extinct" (EX). According to SharkSmart, roughly one hundred gummy sharks are tagged with internal acoustic tags in Western Australia to yield information about possible migration and travel habits.

Bag limits for recreational fishers in Victoria apply. Bag limits are laws placed on fisherman and hunters to limit the number of specific species they are allowed to catch, kill and/or keep. Fishermen have both a bag and a possession limit of two shark and/or school shark, landed whole or as a carcass. There is a five-shark limit for large boats. If caught these sharks must be released if it is in total no larger than 75 cm or roughly two and a half feet. Nonetheless, the discarded survival rate of these sharks remains unquantifiable. This leads to an inaccurate assessment of species population status.

== Physiological responses to capture ==
Mustelus antarcticus is considered one of Australia's most valuable commercial sharks. Due to this, fisheries are constantly discarding them as a byproduct of meeting a commercial quota or minimum length limits for the species. Being captured in itself is extremely stressful for the shark. Adding on to it being released back into the water after undergoing all the distress can impact the shark's survival. Research was conducted to determine the stress factors Mustelus antarcticus would undergo in these situations. In the study, gummy sharks exhibited notable resistance to capture stress after being held for up to four hours. They were able to maintain a steady physiological response during this time. However, they did experience an increase in sea surface temperatures (SST), which could have led to a metabolic rate elevating and anabolic activity in their white muscles. Some factors that could have affected their physiological responses could have been attributed to reduced metabolic scope and enhanced respiratory performance under capture conditions. During the study gummy sharks would lay stationary on the floor to help respiratory performance. The minimum movement during capture attributed significantly to its resilience to stress levels.

== Climate change ==
As the climate changes, the salinity of the ocean shifts. Salinity in shark nurseries, such as Pitter Estuary in Hobart, Tasmania, increases during the summertime. Heavy rainfall, such as strong storms, can dilute the water in estuaries such as these. This significantly impacts elasmobranchs due to their osmoregulatory system being ion-regulating osmoconformers. This means they have to adjust their internal ion concentrations to match the surrounding water, which induces physiological stresses. One stress may be metabolic rate, which is quite common in teleost fish. This is especially disruptive for juveniles in the nursery since hypersaline can cause metabolic, ionic, and osmotic stressors. Juveniles, unlike adult sharks, stay in the nursery for 1–2 years after parental care. However, it has been seen that the number of young gummy sharks has been declining in Pittwater Estuary due to the wet season forcing them to leave. They seem to be migrating towards other nurseries in deeper water. Unfortunately, this puts their survival and growth rates at risk since they are at such a vulnerable and young stage in life. One nursery gummy sharks tend to travel to is Frederick Henry Bay for a brief time. This is beneficial since Frederick Henry Bay has a more stable salinity level compared to Pittwater Estuary, which allows the gummy sharks to experience some relief from these stress factors. Nonetheless, hypersalinity levels (41%) significantly affect Mustelus antarcticus.

Some effect factors that high salinity has on gummy sharks are dysregulation of plasma sodium, an increase in induction of heat shock proteins (HSPs), and, upon returning to normal saltwater salinity, inability to fully recover their aerobic metabolic rates. These stressors can cause long-term health problems.

== Conservation ==
Some key things to consider for the Conservation of Mustelus antarcticus are its physiological limits, reproduction tendencies, and growth. Understanding the physiological limits of gummy sharks is essential, especially with the hypersalinity risks to nurseries. Being exposed to early on physiological stressors can impact the overall health of juvenile sharks. Additionally, the reproductive tendencies section mentions the importance of knowing fertilization time to estimate the reproduction capacity of the population. Having more knowledge of their reproductive mechanisms will help us better understand Mustelus antarcticus. Moreover, how to manage substantial fishery practices. Especially since gummy sharks are a very common commercial species within the Australian region, another thing to consider is taking stock of their growth perimeters to gauge the population dynamics and better establish fishing practices.

== See also ==
- List of marine animals of Australia (temperate waters)
