= Sharpfin houndshark =

Conservation status
- Endangered (IUCN 3.1)

Scientific classification
- Kingdom: Animalia
- Phylum: Chordata
- Class: Chondrichthyes
- Subclass: Elasmobranchii
- Division: Selachii
- Order: Carcharhiniformes
- Family: Triakidae
- Genus: Triakis
- Species: T. acutipinna

Binomial name
- Triakis acutipinna Kato, 1968
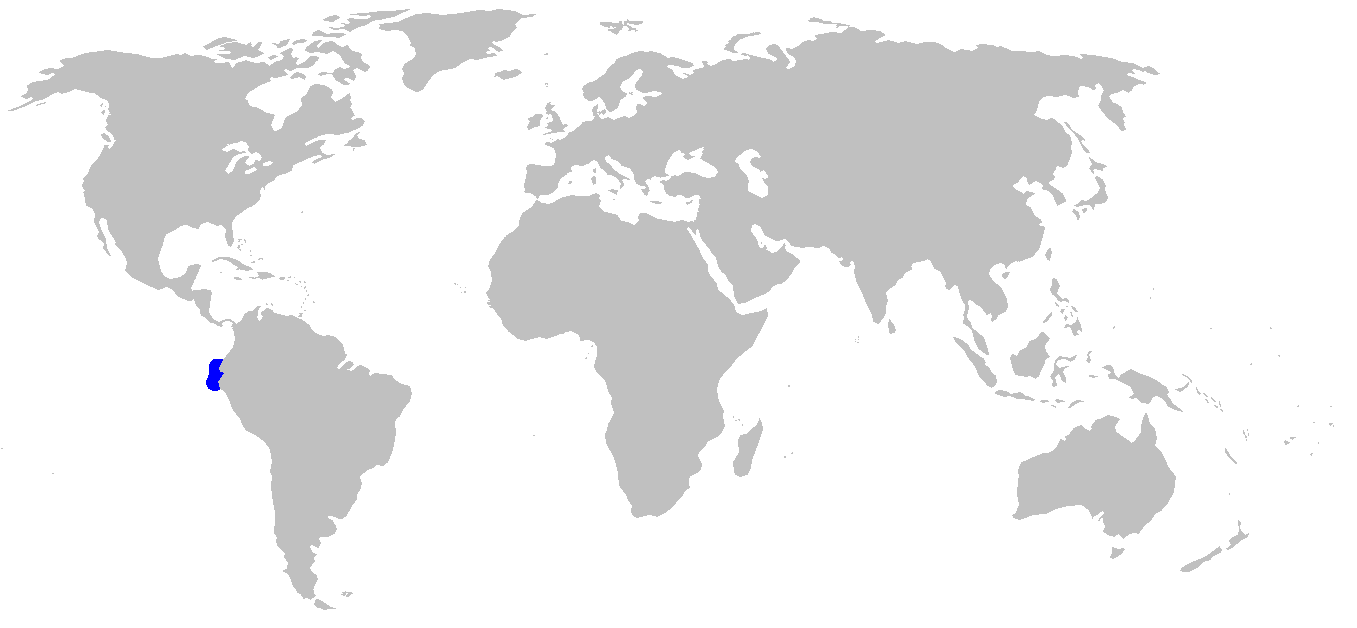

Species of shark

The sharpfin houndshark (Triakis acutipinna) is a rare species of houndshark in the family Triakidae. It is known from only a small number of individuals collected in the coastal waters of Ecuador, the longest one being 1.02 m in length. The reproduction of this houndshark is ovoviviparous. Due to its small known population and range, it is currently classified as endangered by the International Union for Conservation of Nature (IUCN).

== Description ==
The sharpfin houndshark is a small coastal shark species, with known individuals reaching just over 1 m in total length. Females grow slightly larger than males, with females reaching a maximum length of 102 cm and males reaching 90 cm. It has a slender body and well-developed dorsal fins. Due to the limited number of known individuals, detailed morphology about the species is not well known or documented.

== Habitat ==
The sharpfin houndshark is known only from the eastern Pacific Ocean, specifically coastal waters of Ecuador. It has been recorded near areas such as Isla de la Plata and surrounding regions. The species was found in shallow marine environments and can be associated with a variety of habitats, including coral reefs, rocky areas, sandy bottoms, and gravel areas.

== Ecology ==
Little is known about the ecology of Triakis acutipinna. Some evidence suggests that it feeds on benthic organisms, such as crustaceans (including shrimp and crabs) and small bony fishes. Its habitat indicates that it likely stays near the seafloor in coastal environments.

== Reproduction ==
The sharpfin houndshark is ovoviviparous, meaning the embryos develop inside eggs that stay in the mother's body until they hatch.

== Conservation ==
The sharpfin houndshark is classified as endangered by the IUCN Red list. The global population is estimated to include fewer than 2,500 mature individuals, and the population trend is decreasing. The species is likely threatened by incidental capture in coastal fisheries and habitat degradation within its limited range, increasing risk of extinction.
