= Nomen oblitum =

Disused scientific name

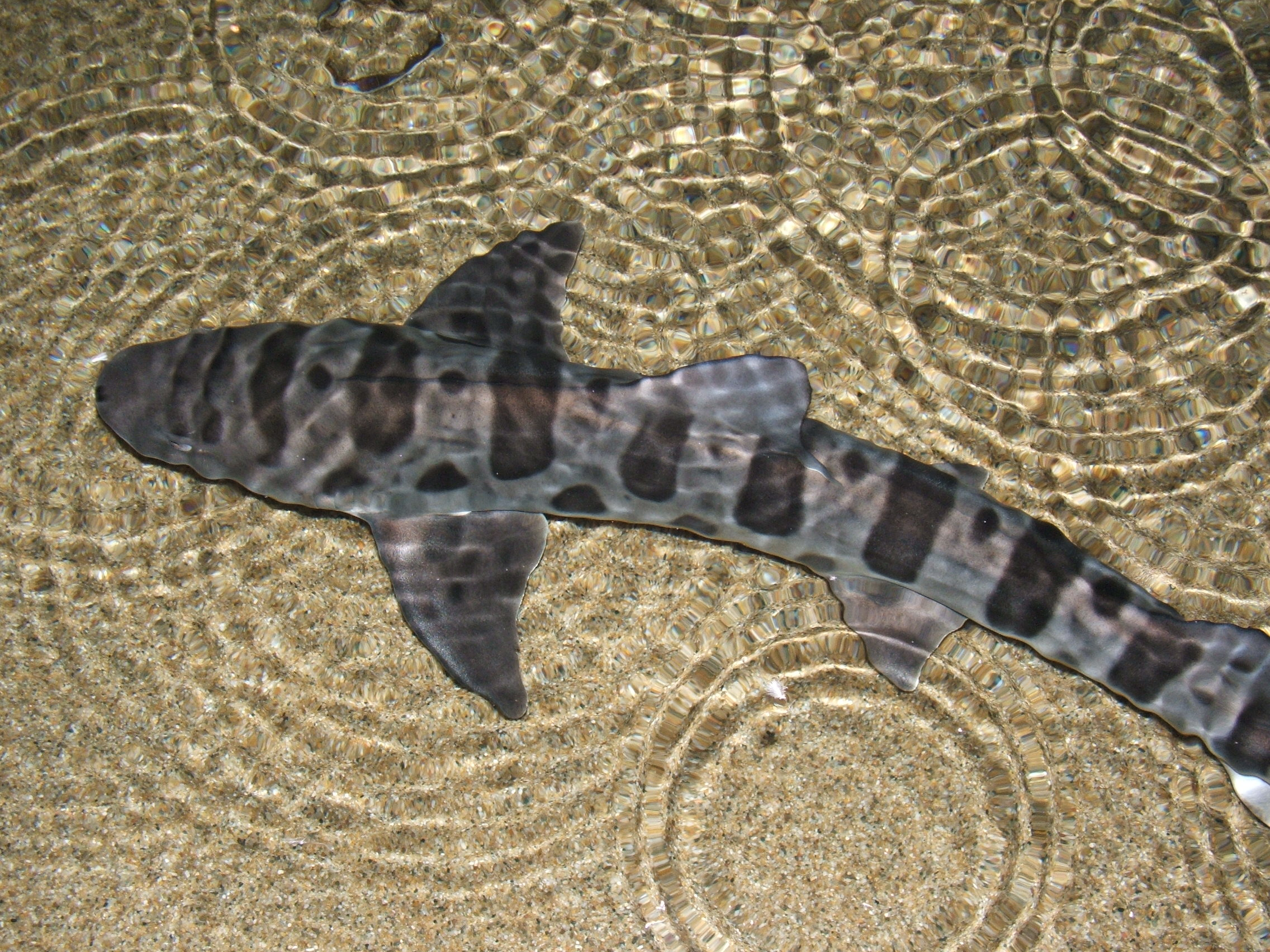
Triakis semifasciata (formerly known as Mustelus felis) at the Monterey Bay Aquarium

In zoological nomenclature, a nomen oblitum (plural: nomina oblita; Latin for 'forgotten name') is a scientific name that has been declared to be obsolete (figuratively "forgotten") in favor of a "protected" name.

The designation nomen oblitum with its present meaning commenced with the fourth edition (1999) of the International Code of Zoological Nomenclature. After 1 January 2000, a scientific name may be formally declared to be a nomen oblitum when it satisfies the following conditions:

1. It is not known to have been used as a valid name in a scientific publication after 1899 (this criterion is taken on faith).
2. It is either a senior synonym (there is also a more recent name that applies to the same taxon and is in common use) or a senior homonym (it is spelled the same as another name that is also in valid use).
3. The preferred junior synonym or homonym is shown to be in wide use, defined as appearing in 25 or more publications in the past 50 years (must cover a period of at least 10) and by at least 10 distinct individual authors.

Once a name has formally been declared to be a nomen oblitum, it is to be "forgotten". By the same act, the other available name may be declared to be protected as a nomen protectum, after which it takes precedence. This procedure as a whole is termed a reversal of precedence. An example is the scientific name for the leopard shark. Despite the name Mustelus felis being the senior synonym, an error in recording the dates of publication resulted in the widespread use of Triakis semifasciata as the shark's scientific name. After this long-standing error was discovered, T. semifasciata was made the valid name (as a nomen protectum) and Mustelus felis was declared invalid (as a nomen oblitum).

== Use in taxonomy ==
The designation nomen oblitum has been used relatively frequently to keep the priority of old, sometimes disused names, and, controversially, often without establishing that a name actually meets the criteria for the designation. Some taxonomists have regarded the failure to properly establish the nomen oblitum designation as a way to avoid doing taxonomic research or to retain a preferred name regardless of priority. When discussing the taxonomy of North American birds, Rea (1983) stated that "...Swainson's [older but disused] name must stand unless it can be demonstrated conclusively to be a nomen oblitum (a game some taxonomists play to avoid their supposed fundamental principle, priority)."

Banks and Browning (1995) responded directly to Rea's strict application of ICZN rules for determining nomina oblita, stating: "We believe that the fundamental obligation of taxonomists is to promote stability, and that the principle of priority is but one way in which this can be effected. We see no stability in resurrecting a name of uncertain basis that has been used in several different ways to replace a name that has been used uniformly for most of a century."

== See also ==
- Glossary of scientific naming
- Nomen conservandum
- Nomen dubium
- Nomen novum
- Nomen nudum
