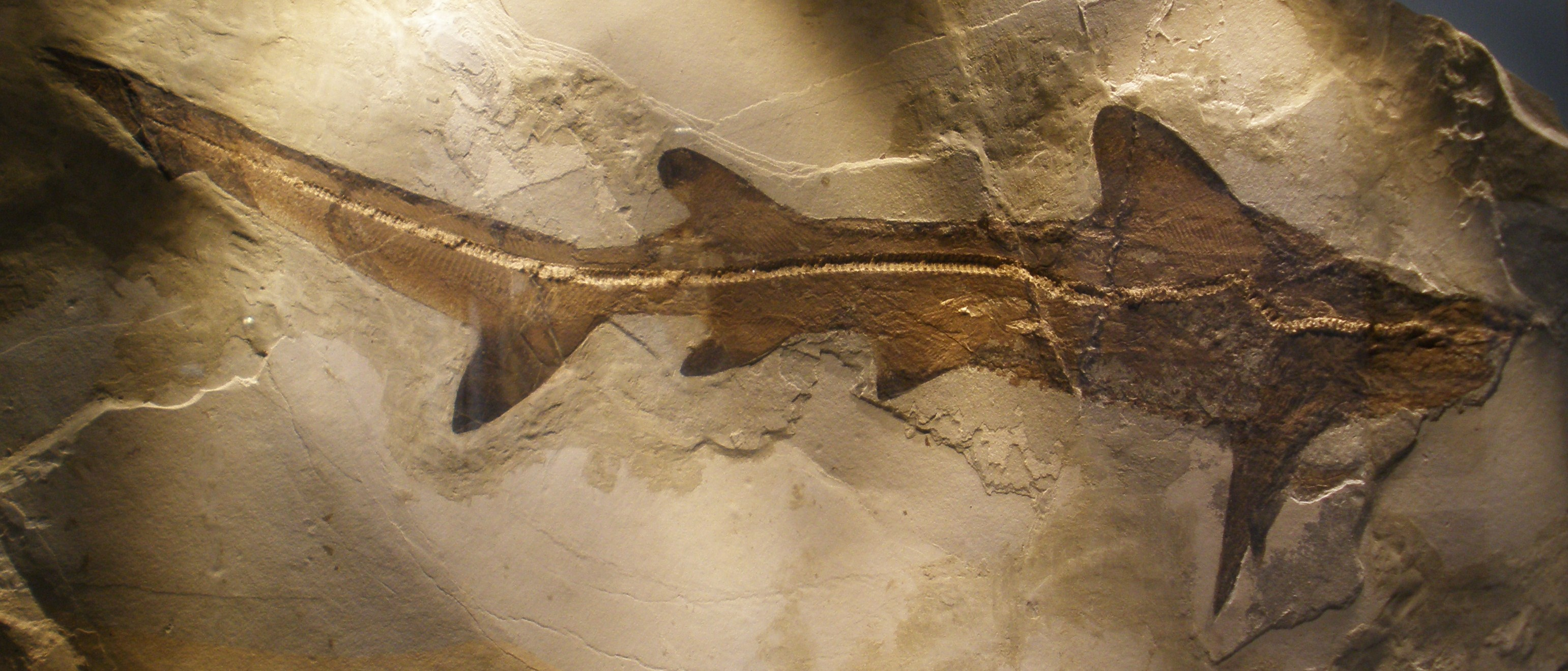
- Specimen, Museo dei Fossili di Bolca

Scientific classification
- Kingdom: Animalia
- Phylum: Chordata
- Class: Chondrichthyes
- Subclass: Elasmobranchii
- Division: Selachii
- Order: Carcharhiniformes
- Family: Triakidae
- Genus: Galeorhinus
- Species: †G. cuvieri

Binomial name
- †Galeorhinus cuvieri (Agassiz, 1835)

Synonyms
- Galeus cuvieri Agassiz, 1835; Protogaleus cuvieri (Agassiz, 1835); Alopiopsis plejodon Lioy, 1865; Physogaleus cuvieri (Agassiz, 1835)

= Galeorhinus cuvieri =

Galeorhinus cuvieri Temporal range: Early Eocene

Extinct species of shark

Galeorhinus cuvieri (named after Georges Cuvier) is an extinct species of houndshark known from the Early Eocene-aged Monte Bolca site of Italy. It was a close relative of the modern tope or school shark, which it is highly morphologically similar to.

== Ecology ==
It is known from six extremely well-preserved specimens that preserve the full body of the shark. A comparison to the modern school shark suggests that these all represent sexually immature juvenile individuals, indicating that the Bolca site may have represented a nursery for a population of G. cuvieri. One particularly well-preserved specimen has preserved soft tissues and even preserved stomach contents, which appear to be of a barracuda (Sphyraena bolcensis). As reef-dwelling populations of the modern school shark also show a preference for feeding on barracudas, this suggests a long history of predator-prey interactions between these two genera.

== Taxonomy ==
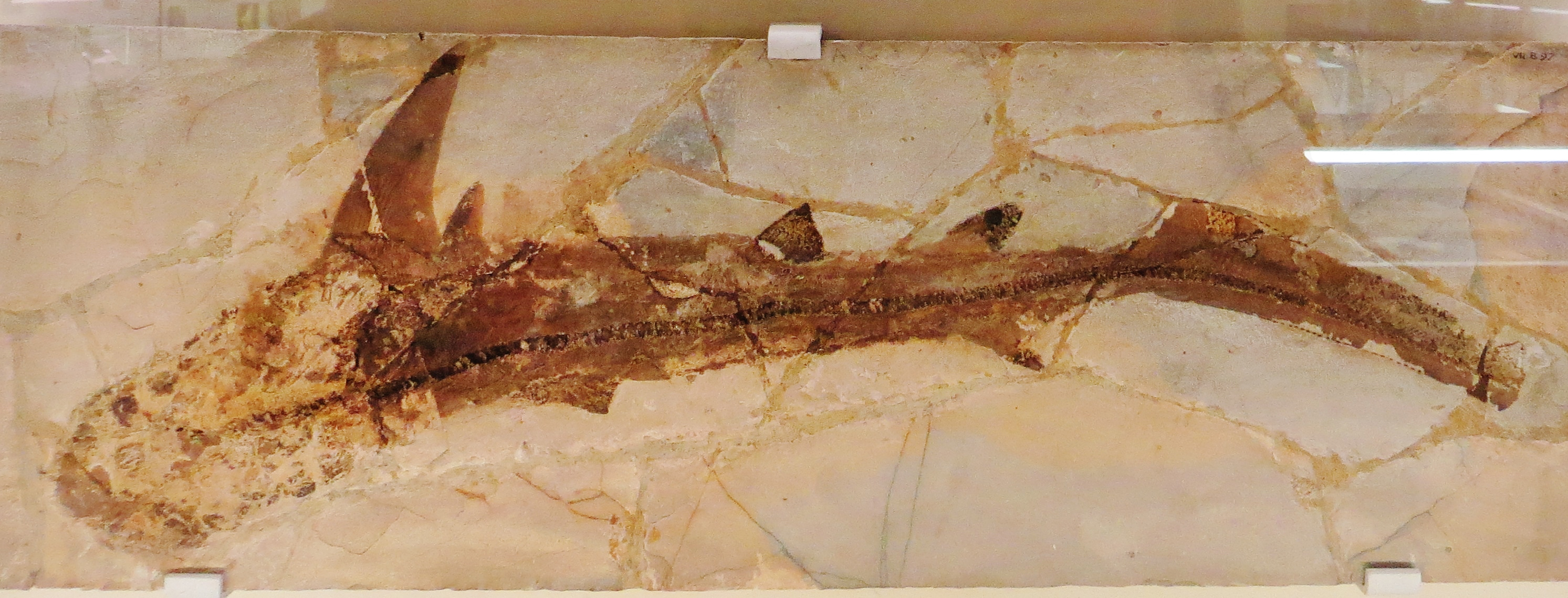
G. cuvieri specimen, Museo di Storia Naturale di Verona

This species has had a complex taxonomic history. One specimen of the species was initially misidentified by Volta (1796) as a fossil specimen of the great white shark (Carcharodon carcharias, at the time Squalus carcharias), and another as a fossil specimen of the zebra shark (Stegostoma tigrinum, at the time Squalus fasciatus). It was officially described by Agassiz (1835) as Galeus cuvieri. It was afterwards placed into its own genus, Protogaleus by Molin (1860), which itself was treated in some studies as synonymous with Alopiopsis. Cappetta (1975) re-analyzed the Bolca sharks and divided them between Eogaleus and Protogaleus cuvieri, which he recognized as a species of Galeorhinus. However, later authors, including Cappetta, disputed the placement of this species in the extant Galeorhinus, and instead placed it in the extinct Physogaleus, otherwise known only from teeth. In a comprehensive analysis, Federico et al (2016) affirmed G. cuvieri as being a member of Galeorhinus, noting its strong morphological similarities and dentition to the school shark.
