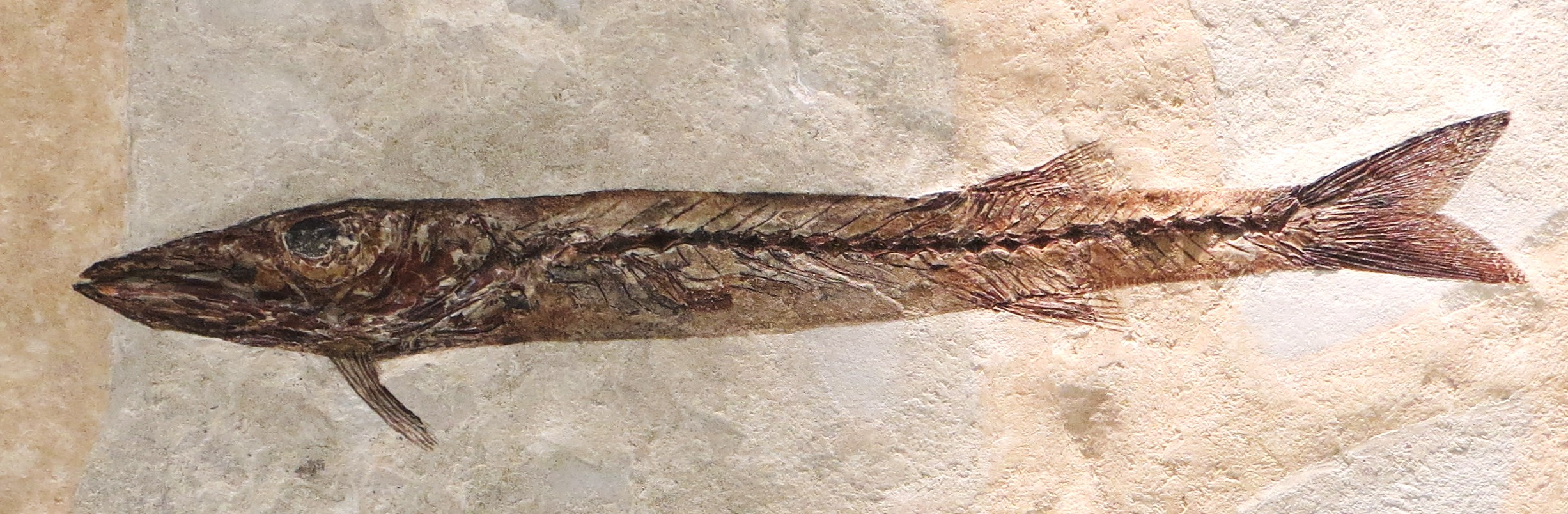
- Fossil specimen, Museo di Arsago Seprio

Scientific classification
- Kingdom: Animalia
- Phylum: Chordata
- Class: Actinopterygii
- Division: Teleostei
- Order: Carangiformes
- Suborder: Centropomoidei
- Family: Sphyraenidae
- Genus: Sphyraena
- Species: †S. bolcensis

Binomial name
- †Sphyraena bolcensis Agassiz, 1835

Synonyms
- S. gracilis Agassiz, 1843

= Sphyraena bolcensis =

Sphyraena bolcensis Temporal range: Early Eocene

Extinct species of fish

Sphyraena bolcensis is an extinct species of prehistoric barracuda known from the Eocene. It is known from the late Ypresian-aged Monte Bolca site of Italy.

== Taxonomy ==
It is one of the earliest and best-known fossil barracudas. It was initially described by Volta (1796) as a fossil specimen of the modern Sphyraena sphyraena, before Agassiz (1835) moved it to its own species, where it has since remained. More recent studies suggest that it appears to predate the evolutionary radiation of crown group Sphyraena, and thus likely represents a stem-group barracuda. Despite being classified in the extant genus Sphyraena, its phylogenetic affinities have never been properly studied, and it thus may not necessarily be a true member of the genus, especially given it predates the modern barracuda radiation.

== Description ==
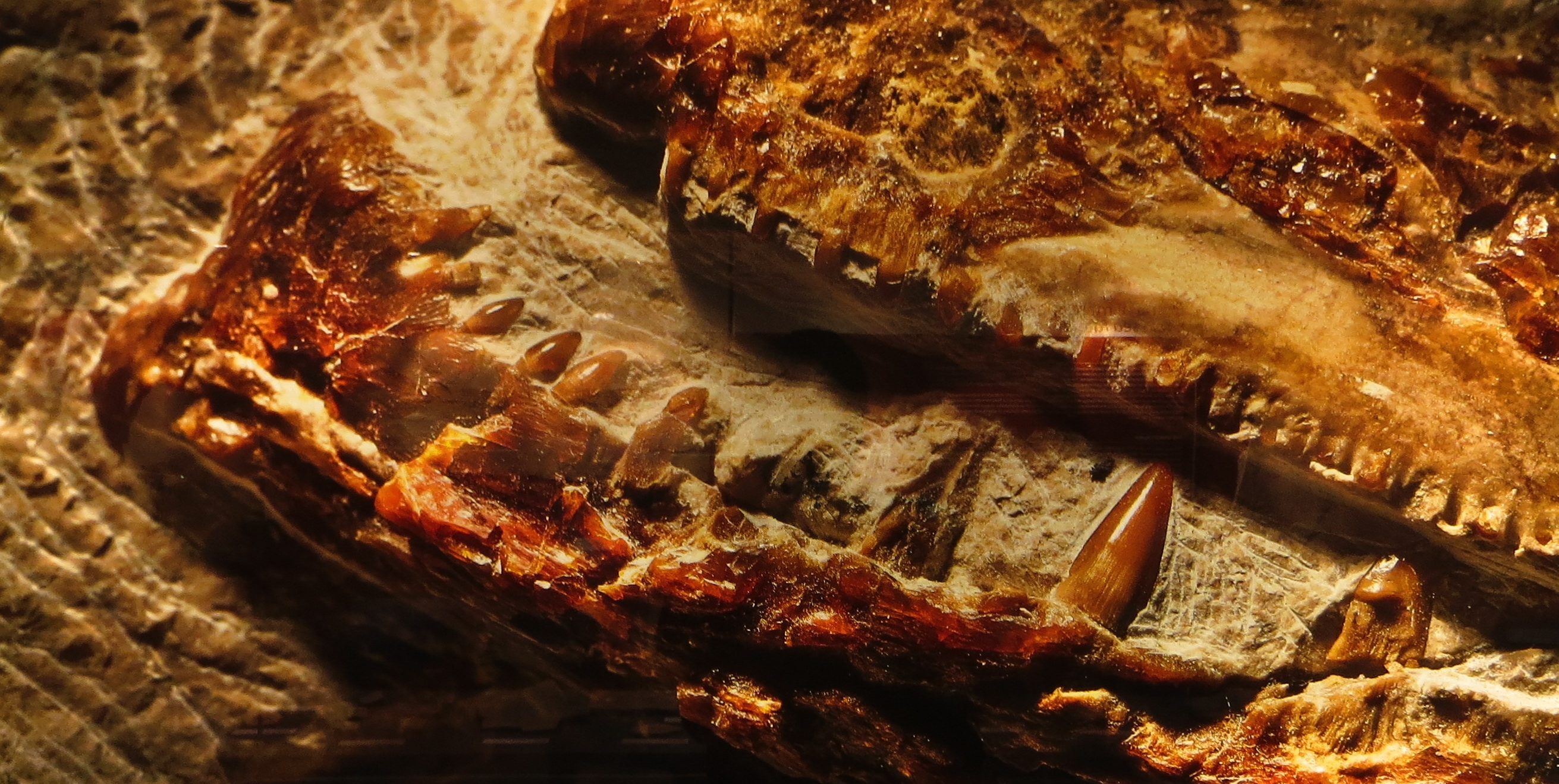
Close-up of S. bolcensis dentition, Museo dei Fossili di Bolca

It could grow as long as nearly 1 metre (3.3 ft), though most specimens tend to range between 0.27 metres (0.89 ft) and 0.36 metres (1.2 ft).

== Ecology ==
A fossil specimen of the extinct shark Galeorhinus cuvieri has the partially-preserved remains of an S. bolcensis in its stomach. This is reminiscent of the preference of its modern relative, the school shark (G. galeus), for also preying on barracudas, suggesting that this predator-prey relationship has lasted nearly 50 million years.
