= List of museums in Province of Varese =

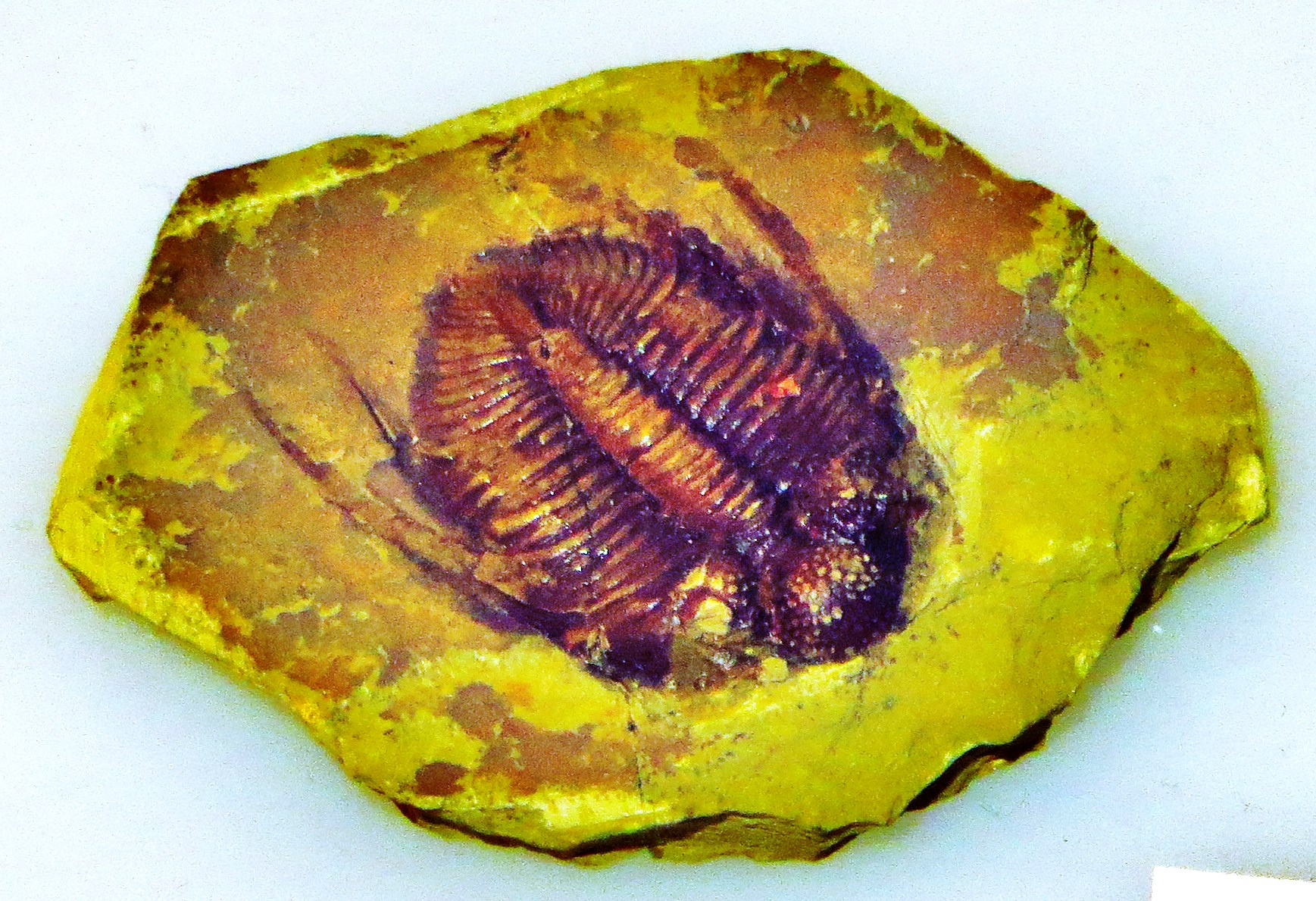
Fossil of Coronocephalus - picture taken at Museo di Arsago Seprio.

This is a list of museums in the Province of Varese, Lombardy Region, Italy.

== Museums and ecomuseums ==
Name	Image	Location	City	Province	Network	Area of study	Summary
Civico Museo Archeologico di Angera			Angera	Varese	SiMArch della Provincia di Varese		
Museo Civico Archeologico di Arsago Seprio			Arsago Seprio	Varese	SiMArch della Provincia di Varese		
Museo Civico di Sesto Calende			Sesto Calende	Varese	SiMArch della Provincia di Varese		
Musei Civici di Varese			Varese	Varese	SiMArch della Provincia di Varese		
Giardino Montano per la Conservazione della Biodiversità "Ruggero Tomaselli"			Campo dei Fiori di Varese	Varese		Botanical garden	
Museo Giuseppe Gianetti			Saronno	Varese		18th-Century and contemporary ceramic art	
