= Museum Giuseppe Gianetti =

Museum in Saronno, Italy

- Museo della ceramica Giuseppe Gianetti
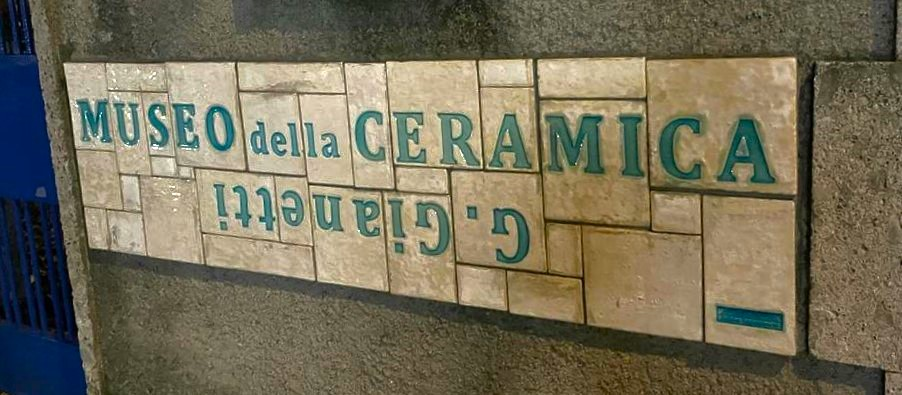
- Welcome panel of the museum
- Interactive fullscreen map
- Established: 1994; 32 years ago
- Location: Via Carcano, 9, 21047 Saronno, (VA), Lombardy, Italy
- Coordinates: 45°37′30.1″N 9°01′58.3″E
- Type: Ceramics museum
- Collections: Giuseppe Gianetti Collection, Aldo Marcenaro Collection, Contemporary Ceramics Collection
- Visitors: 1370 (2022).
- Director: Mara De Fanti
- Public transit access: Trenord - Saronno railway station: (S1, S3, S9, Regionale R17, R22, R28)
- Website: www.museogianetti.it

The Museum Giuseppe Gianetti (Italian: Museo della ceramica Giuseppe Gianetti) is a ceramics museum located in Saronno, Italy. The Museum includes collections of different types of porcelain, majolica, and ceramics that belonged to the Italian industrialist Giuseppe Gianetti. These showcase more than 200 pieces of Meissen porcelain, which represent the Museum's most substantial collection. Other collections cover Oriental porcelain, Italian and European majolica, and porcelain. The original collections have been expanded to include the Aldo Marcenaro Collection and a collection of contemporary ceramics.

Its collections and role in ceramics research make it one of the most important museums of its kind in Italy and Europe.

== Location ==
The museum is located at 9 Via Carcano, in the downtown area of the city of Saronno, in the province of Varese, in Lombardy.

== History ==
=== Giuseppe Gianetti and the origins of the collection ===
Giuseppe Gianetti was born on January 29, 1887, and died on April 9, 1950, in Saronno. He was a collector of artistic objects, particularly ceramics. His collection of ceramics began in 1913 with objects from different sources in Europe and China. He had a collection of Meissen porcelain of which he was particularly fond. Throughout his life, he also acquired other artistic pieces such as sculptures, furniture and paintings.

=== Villa Biffi and the Museum Giuseppe Gianetti ===
The Museum Giuseppe Gianetti was established in 1994 in the center of Saronno in Villa Biffi, constructed in the 1930s. It previously served as the residence of Nina Biffi, the sister of Giuseppe Gianetti's wife.

The historical villa preserves its original parquet flooring, marble features, staircases, window fixtures, furnishings, paintings, mirrors, and Murano glass chandeliers. The bathrooms retain original fittings, including the original light switches. The handrail adorning the staircase leading to the Museum's second level is meticulously fashioned according to a design conceptualized by Carla Biffi, one of Nina Biffi's siblings.

=== The COE Foundation and the opening of the museum ===
In 1994, Villa Biffi was donated to the COE Foundation and opened as the Museum Giuseppe Gianetti.

The COE Foundation, also known as the Center for Educational Guidance, was established in 1976 and is recognized as a "Worship and Religious Institution". It operates under the guidance of evangelical principles, managing hospitality facilities and organizing cultural activities.

The art education initiatives of COE combine a blend of cultural, artistic, and environmental heritage experiences. These initiatives have contributed to establish connections between schools and territories both in Italy and globally. The Association is also involved in international projects. These projects engage a diverse group of authors, insiders, schools, and cultural institutions.

== Collections ==
The Museum's display is categorised into three distinct collections.

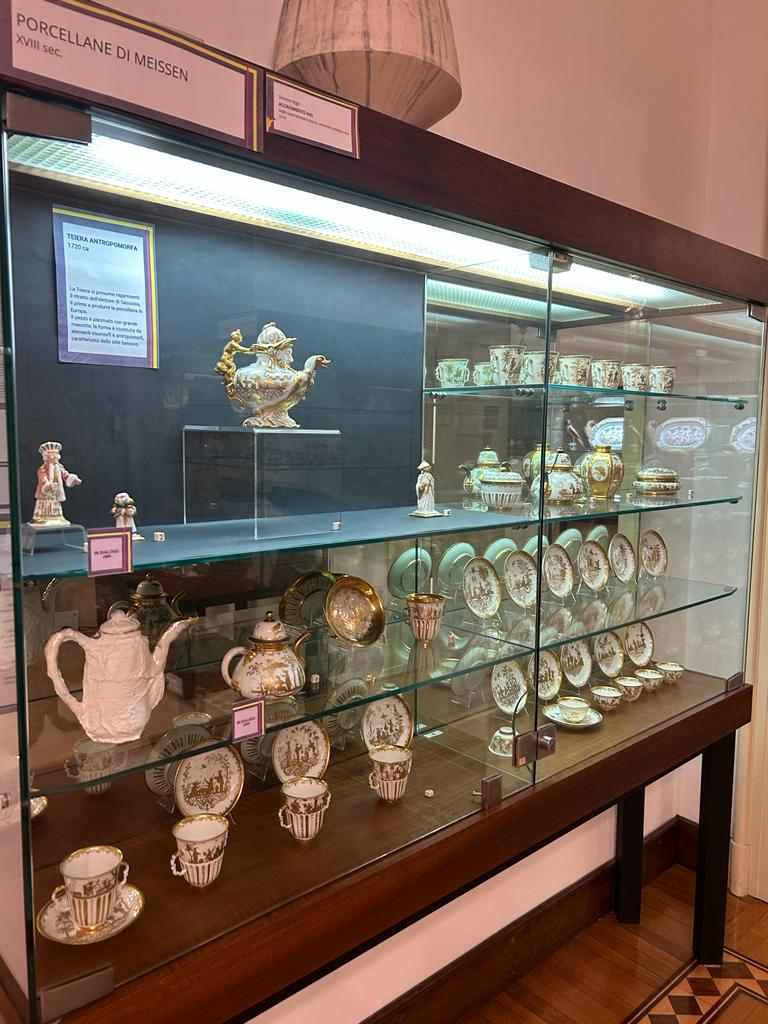
Meissen Porcelain Collection

=== First Collection ===
The first and largest collection contains approximately 200 pieces of porcelain, produced from the 1720s to the early decades of the 18th century in Meissen, Germany.

=== Second Collection ===
The second collection contains various Italian, European, and Oriental porcelains. They include distinctive examples of Italian ceramic manufacturing, including Hewelcke, Vezzi, Ginori, and Capodimonte. The collection includes sixty-five items representing European craftsmanship including items from Vienna, Ludwigsburg, Kloster Veilsdorf, Zurich, Saint Cloud, Chantilly, Mennecy, Vincennes-Sèvres, Tournai, and Chelsea. The Oriental section consists of 33 Chinese and Japanese pieces created by the East India Company specifically for the Western market.

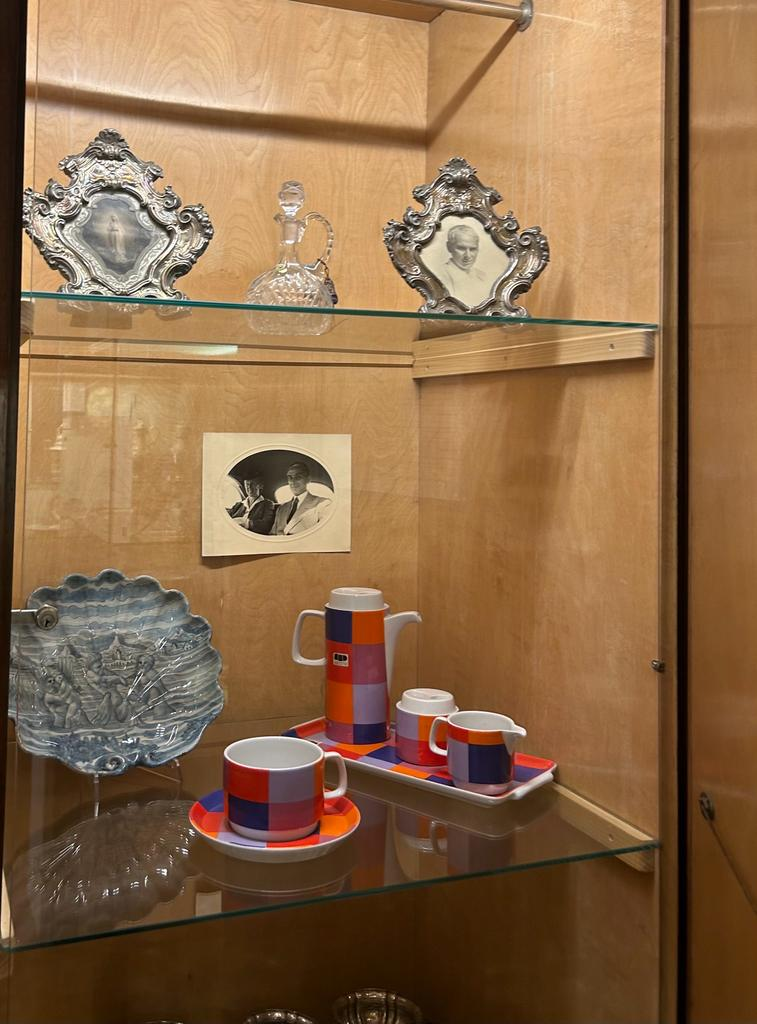
Part of the Italian Majolica Collection

=== Third Collection ===
The third section is dedicated to 18th century Italian and European majolica, compromises of approximately 230 pieces manufactured in Milan.

=== Aldo Marcenaro's Collection ===
In 2004 the Museum incorporated Aldo Marcenaro's artworks in its collection to mark the 20th anniversary of opening to the public. Aldo Marcenaro (1931–2011) was a professor at the San Martino Hospital of Genova and was a collector specializing in ceramics from the 18th century. The foremost segment among the 24 artworks included original pieces from Meissen, Germany. Within this collection, there are also several pieces designed for tea and coffee, along with a dish embellished with Kakiemon decorative elements and European majolica.

=== Contemporary Ceramics Collection ===
Several Italian artists' works are showcased in the contemporary section, including those of F. Dusi, G. Spector and G. Robustelli.

== Museum's Sections ==
The Museum is organised into nine distinct sections, each designated to accommodate a specific collection. These sections are separated into five segments dedicated to the varied typologies and origins of porcelain (Oriental, Meissen, European, Italian, and contemporary), while the remaining four are devoted to the diverse classifications of Majolica (Milanese, Italian, European, and the Chamber of the Triton).

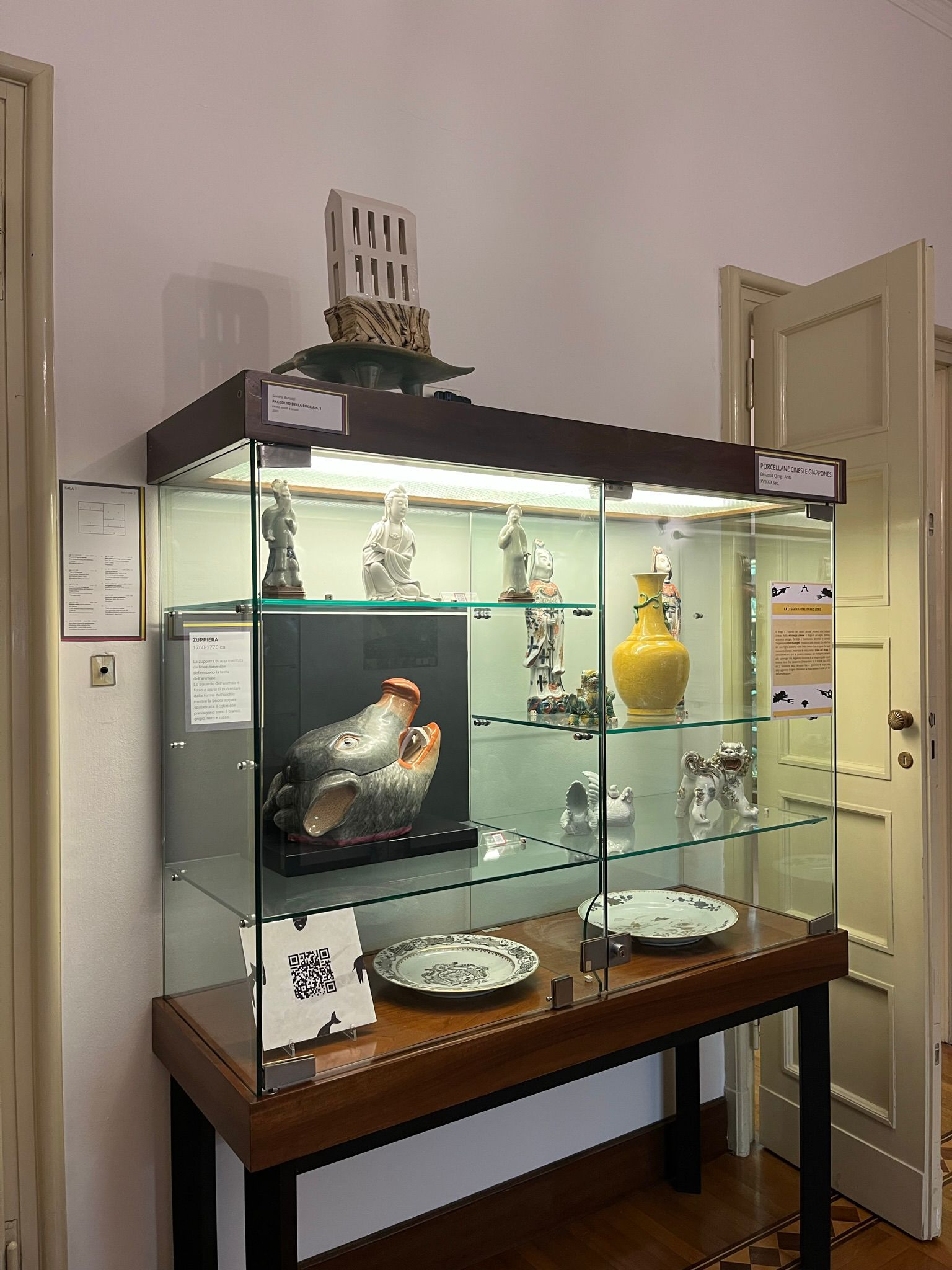
Part of the 18th-century Oriental Porcelain Collection.

=== Room 1 - Oriental Porcelains ===
The room represents the widespread European fascination with Japanese art and culture called Japonisme in the late 19th century. This led to an increase in the popularity of Chinese and Japanese ceramics in affluent European homes and gatherings in cities like Milan, Genoa, and Venice. Gianetti also indulged in acquiring 18th century Oriental porcelain from both China and Japan, although his main interest remained in European ceramics. The room contains a collection of Chinese Qing and Japanese Edo artifacts, focusing on small sculptures. Despite the limited quantity, the collection includes a diverse array of works, ranging from Celadon to Blanc de Chine. It incorporates pieces from both the Green Family and the Rose Family, along with porcelain items from the East India Company.

=== Room 2 - Meissen Porcelains ===
This room represents Western porcelain production, created in Meissen near Dresden, Saxony, through the efforts of Johann Friedrich Böttgerand with the support of Augustus II, Elector of Saxony. The first European porcelain factory was established in Meissen in 1710. The manufacturing method remained a secret until 1719 when it was acquired and spread across Europe.

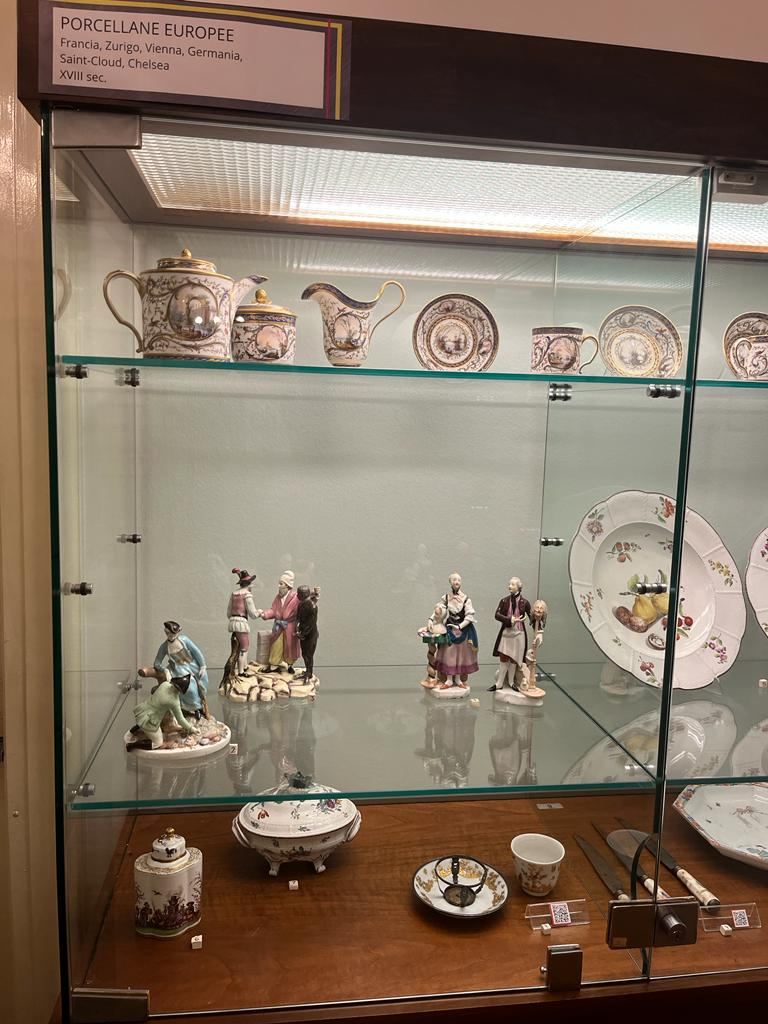
Part of the European Porcelain Collection

=== Room 3 and Room 4 - European and Italian Porcelains ===
These two rooms represent the spread of porcelain production across Europe during the 18th century, as the technique for making hard-paste porcelain spread across Europe as skilled workers left Meissen and chemists found kaolin-rich clays elsewhere. Various factories arose under different European courts, evolving as entrepreneurs established factories driven by industrial goals.

The collection includes Italian porcelain manufactured in Venice, Nove, Este, and Treviso, concentrated near the main high-quality Italian kaolin quarry, situated in Veneto, near Vicenza. The absence of pure kaolin quarries prevented the country's porcelain from matching the material quality of German or French counterparts, although Italian porcelain holds its own in terms of artistic merit.

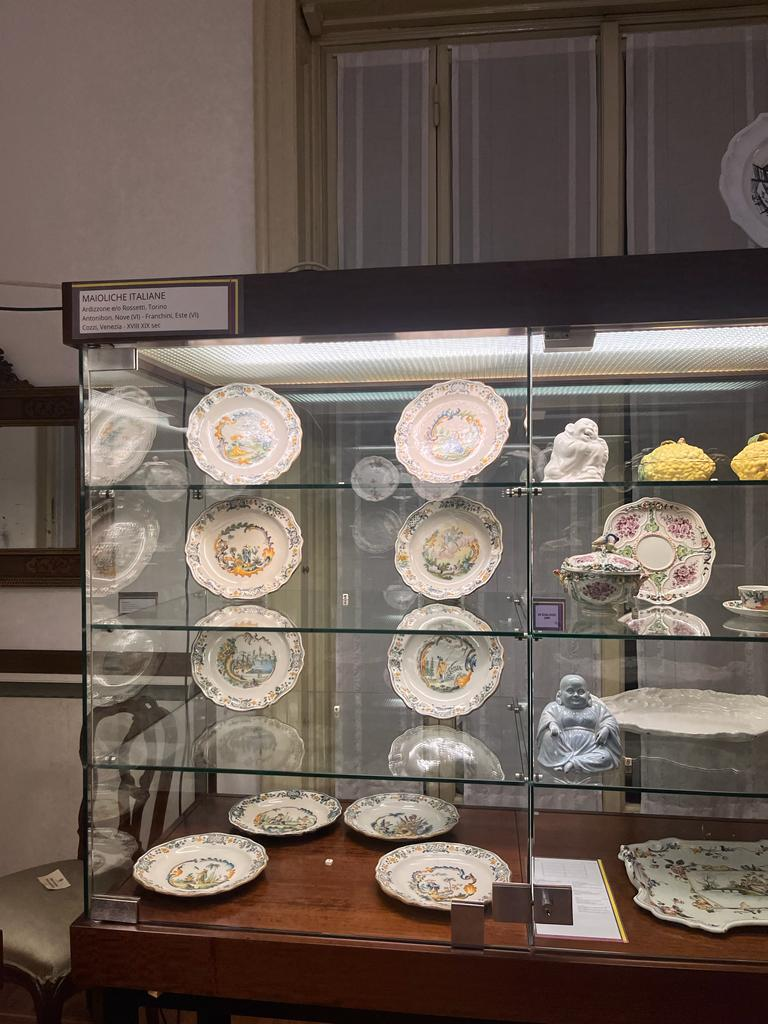
Italian Majolica

=== Room 5, Room 6 and Room 7 - Italian and European Majolica ===
Three rooms include collections representing the development and spread of fine majolica production across multiple Italian regions and workshops in the 18th century. These included Ferniani in Faenza, Clerici in Milan, Rubati in Turin, Finck in Bologna, Casali and Callegari in Pesaro, Roletti in Urbino, Fuina in Castelli, Cialli in Rome, and Barone Malvica's workshop in Palermo. Major porcelain factories like those of Ginori and Cozzi also had adjoining workshops for majolica.

The collection provides examples of how these workshops exchanged design ideas, leading to shared decorative patterns. These included: motifs like "blanser" from Novese origins appearing in Bologna and Urbino majolica; and, motifs like "fruit decorations," perhaps influenced by Lombardian models, appearing in Milan and Nove. The French-inspired "Berain-style" decorations, with variations, were also seen in majolica from various origins.

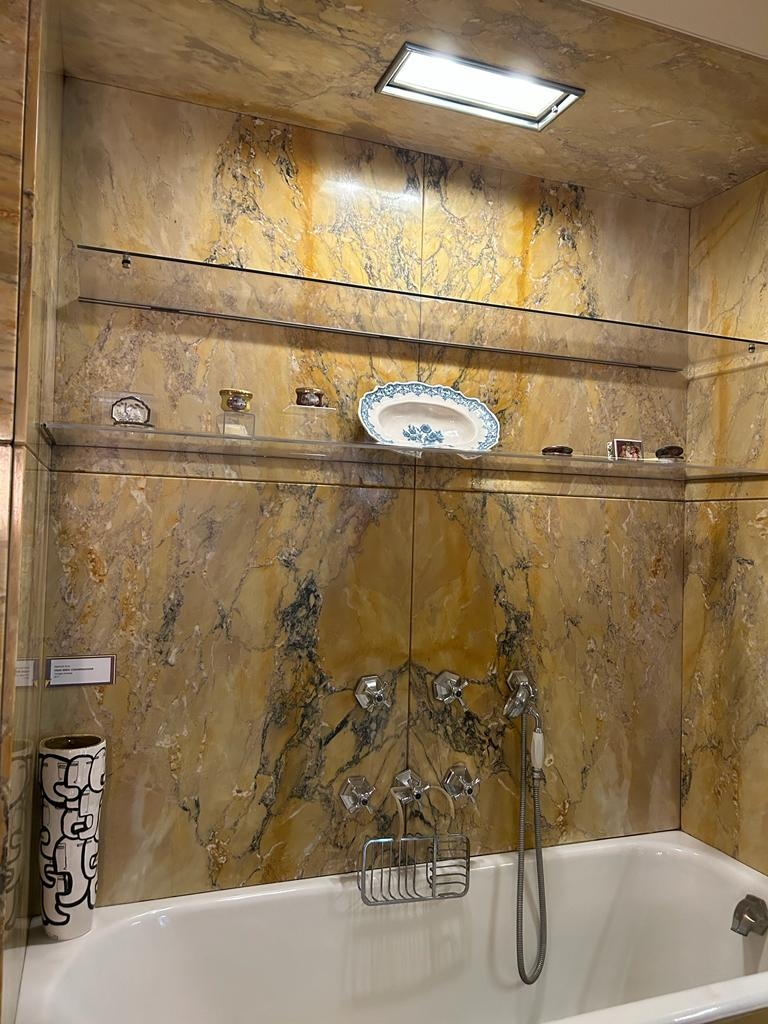
The Bathtub

=== Room 8 - Contemporary Porcelains ===
Since the inception of the "Artemondo Gallery", the Museum has assembled a collection of contemporary ceramics, endeavoring to cultivate scholarly exploration and meaningful discourse in conjunction with the original pieces from its 18th century collection.

=== Room 9 - Chamber of Triton ===
The first-floor bathroom, in which the original bath is still visible, presents a luminous space decorated with large yellow Siena marble slabs on the walls, with a floor of black African marble. A barrel-vaulted ceiling is adorned with stucco craftsmanship depicting the majestic presence of a Triton. The bathtub, still featuring its original taps, was installed within a niche under a recessed glass ceiling light embellished with decorations inspired by marine themes.

== Temporary Collection "The Legend of "Pacifiers & Fishes" ==
The temporary collection "The Legend of "Pacifiers & Fishes" (November 25, 2023 - December 21, 2023) was inspired by Lucia Cuozzo's Amalfi legend. The project comprised 18 artists creating 18 illustrated plates using diverse techniques. Salerno-based ceramist and visual designer Gianluca Tesauro contributed brown-decorated ceramics that, when combined, depict imaginative creatures merging donkeys and fish. The initiative also includes a limited edition hand-sewn book featuring the artists' graphic works. The Legend is adapted for different Italian locations. It was initially translated into the Varese dialect by Angelo Zilio for the Lombard exhibition, and later illustrated by four local artists. Originating in Vietri sul Mare, the exhibition had been showcased in Savona during the Majolica Festival and scheduled to visit Veneto in 2024. The individuals who contributed to the creation of the artworks include Alex Raso, Alfredo Guarracino Alboy, Daniela Giorgina Scalese, David&Golia, Elisa d'Arienzo, Fabio Taramasco, Francesco Carbone, Gabriele MrCorto Resmini, Gianluca Tesauro and many others.

== Exhibitions ==
The permanent collection of the Museum includes a number of distinct exhibits:

Work name	Original Italian Name	Age	Material	Style
"Figure of Guanyin"	"Figura di Guanyin"	1662 - 1722	Porcelain	Japonisme
"The sale of the dark slave"	"La vendita dello schiavo moro"	1770	Hard porcelain painted in polychrome	Enlightenment
"Oriental man with high turban"	"Uomo orientale con alto turbante"	1760 - 1780	Hard porcelain painted in polychrome and gilded	Recueil Ferriol
"Container in the shape of a partridge"	"Contenitore a forma di pernice"	1756 - 1790	Majolica	Trompe-l'œil
"Watch holder with yellow dress"	"Portaorologio con veste gialla"	1770 - 1776	Painted porcelain	Imari
"Harlequin plays with a bird and a cat"	"Arlecchino gioca con un uccello e con un gatto"	1743 - 1760	Hard porcelain painted in polychrome and gold	Rococo

=== "Figure of Guanyin" ===
The Guanyin ("Figura di Guanyin" in italian) is a refined example of the small white porcelain sculptures (called 'Blanc de Chine') produced between the late 17th and early 18th centuries in the Chinese Dehua region. The figure depicts the divine figure of Buddhist origin, seated in the sacred mudra position: the regal repose. The piece reflects the increasing European interest in Chinese and Japonise porcelain art from the late 19th century, and the presence of 'Blanc de Chine' in several Italian porcelain Museums.

=== "The sale of the dark slave" ===
This group, known as "The Human Trafficking" ("Trafficanti di Uomini" in Italian) in the inventory of the manufacturer, belongs to the plastic production of the finest Swiss porcelain factory led by Adam Spengler from 1763 to 1790. Spengler was an interpreter of the Enlightenment taste that propelled the European avant-garde. He conceived nearly 400 models of small sculptures, among which this one is regarded as one of the most unique and rare.

=== "Oriental man with high turban" ===
This sculpture ("Un uomo orientale con alto turbante" in Italian) belongs to a series derived from the set of engravings known as "Recueil Ferriol", depicting Oriental costumes. In the production of the Doccia porcelain factory, founded by Marquis Carlo Ginori in 1741, plastic production played a significant role and this theme is revisited multiple times, as evidenced by the variations in the base of this sculpture.

=== "Container in the shape of a partridge" ===
This example of trompe-l'œil ceramics ("Contenitore a forma di pernice" in Italian) reflects a successful theme of European manufacturers during the 18th century, used to adorn festive tables and characterized by the use of large cabbages, pumpkins, lemons, artichokes, bunches of asparagus alongside turkeys and hens. This exhibit exemplifies the fine "deceptive" majolica from the two most notable factories in Milan.

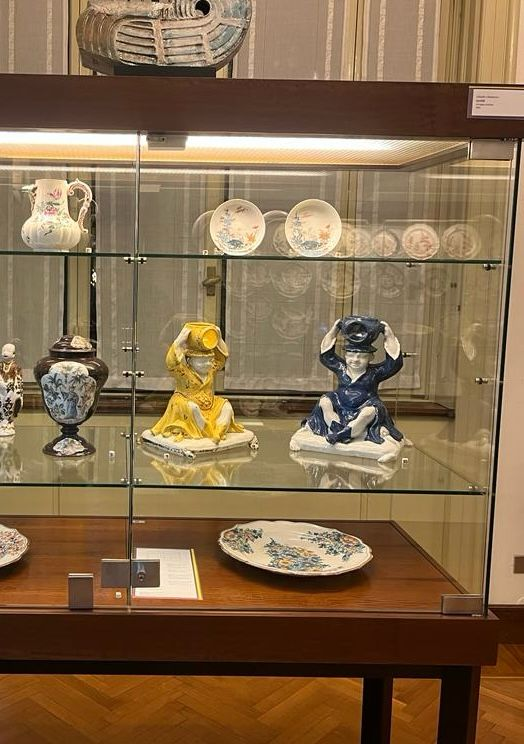
Watch holders with blue and yellow dress

=== "Watch holder with yellow dress" ===
This exhibit ("Portaorologio con veste gialla" in Italian) is representative of the production known as "Chinese Imari", produced in the 18th century by two factories in Milan. It is characterized by various decorative motifs painted in a trichrome palette (deep blue in grand feu, red and gold in petit feu). This term refers to a Chinese serial production inspired by Japanese ornamental formulas. The "ostrich" and "casotto" (known as "carabiniere") patterns are among the most renowned of these decorative styles.

=== "Harlequin plays with a bird and a cat" ===
One of the most celebrated figures in the history of European porcelain is Johann Joachim Kändler, the chief modeler of the Meissen manufactory from 1733 to 1775. A highly skilled sculptor in the Rococo style, he revolutionized small-scale porcelain sculpture in Europe, giving new vitality into the figures and collaborating with other artistic talents, such as Johann Friedrich Eberlein, the creator of this particular model ("Arlecchino gioca con un uccello e con un gatto" in Italian).

== Library ==
Giuseppe Gianetti's book collection encompasses approximately a thousand texts related to art. The collection comprises works on:

- Ancient and contemporary Italian ceramics
- European ceramics
- International ceramics
- Decorative arts like goldsmith, weaving, wooden sculpture, glass
- Prints
- Design texts
- Art history catalogues and essays
- Nineteenth and twentieth centuries books
- Catalogues of auctions and antique exhibitions
- Pantries
- Trade journals

The consultation of books in the library is possible by reservation.

== Internal Organization ==
The Museum is governed by the Board of Directors of the COE Foundation and the Artistic Committee. This Committee is composed of seven members, which includes the Director, Conservator, and a representative from the Municipality of Saronno.

Mara De Fanti is both the Director and the Curator of the Museum. From 1993 to 1998, De Fanti studied at the Brera Academy of Fine Arts in Milan, and from 2010 to 2011 pursued a course in antiquarian art.

The Museum staff includes a Head of Education Services, a Technical Safety Officer, and a Custodian and the Museum engages volunteer staff.

== Ceramics Festival ==
From June 23 to June 25, 2023, the third Ceramics Festival took place in Saronno, organized by the museum with the assistance of the municipality of Saronno and Faenza, the Lombardy Region, the province of Varese and AICC (Associazione Italiana Città della Ceramica). It focused exclusively on high-quality ceramics, with the goal of promoting awareness of the significance of this material and showcasing national excellence.

The keyword of the festival was "Fragile". The approaches towards a fragile subject/object can vary, from care and conservation to restoration, mishandling any of these actions may result in fractures or breakage. Artistic heritage itself follows this logic: if properly tended to, these treasures continue to recount their stories and history.

Several exhibitions and installations were organized in the city, particularly in the streets of the historic center, with the participation of national and international artists. Workshops on clay manipulation, engobe decoration, ceramic painting, demonstrations on the potter's wheel, raku firing and dripping time workshop were organized within the museum.

== Gallery ==
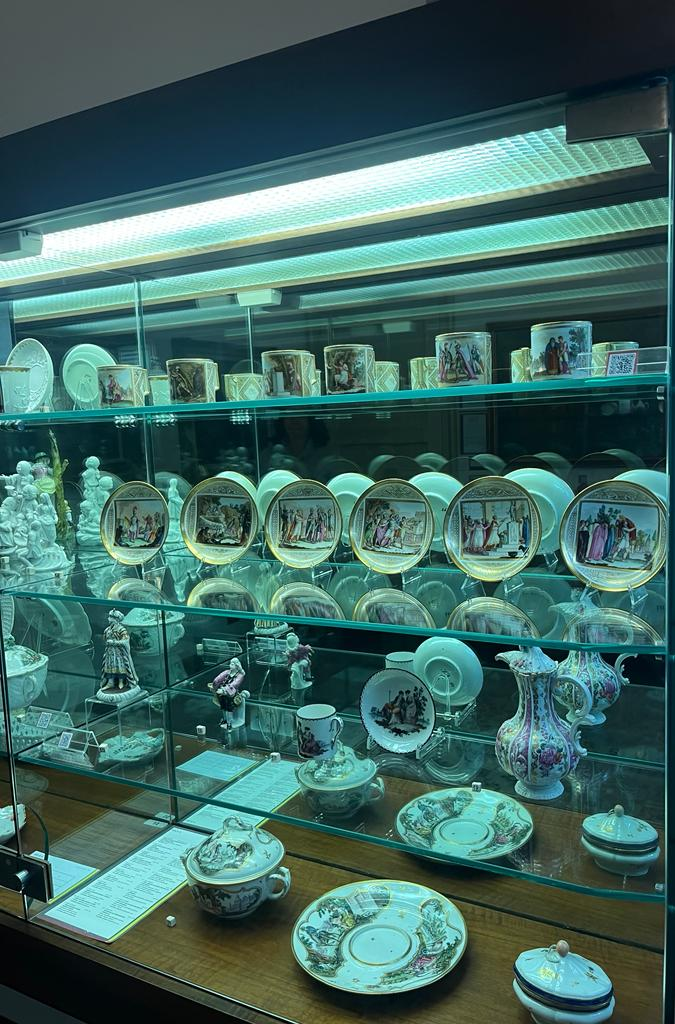
Part of the Italian Porcelain Collection

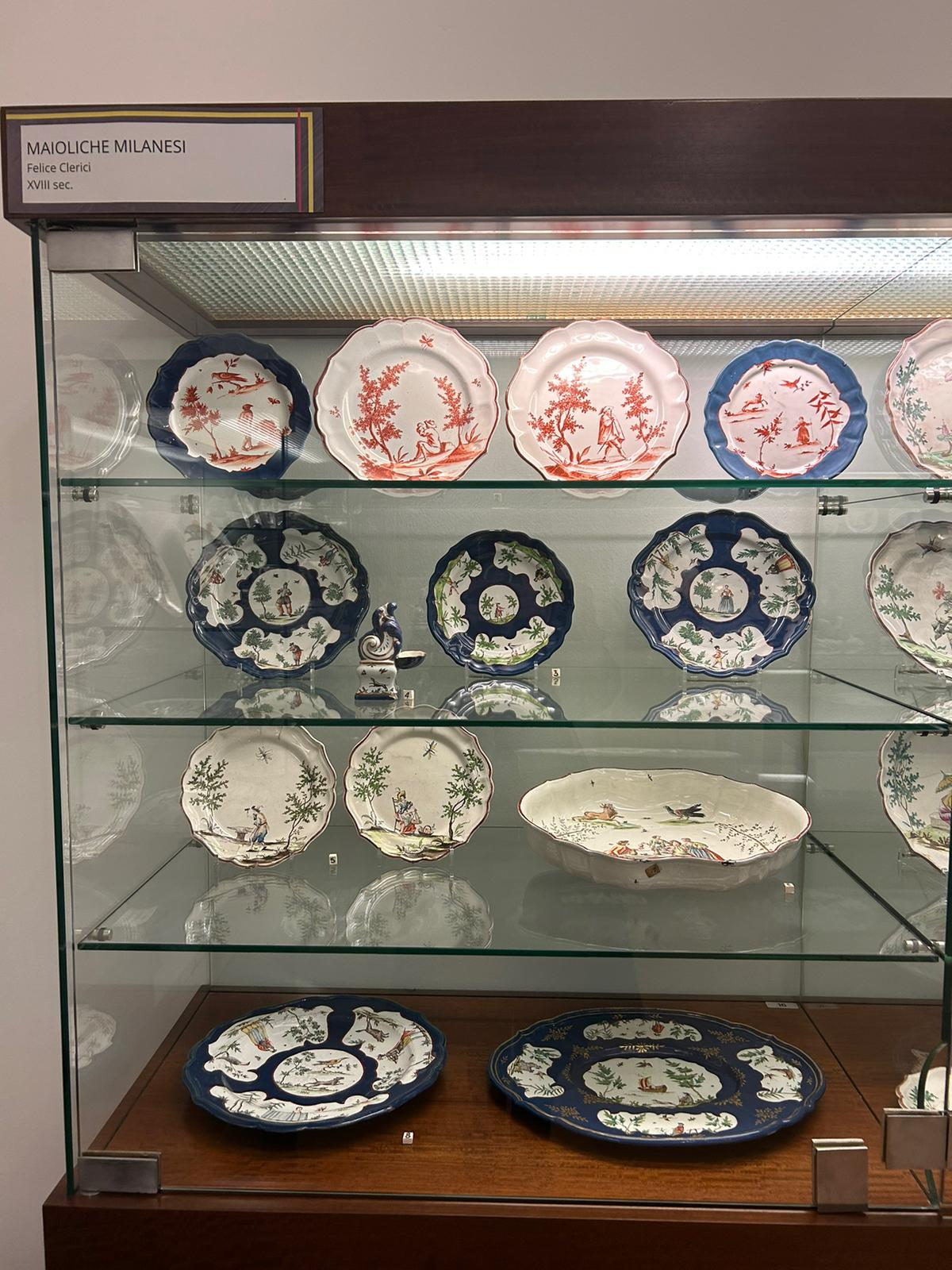
Part of the Milanese Maiolica collection

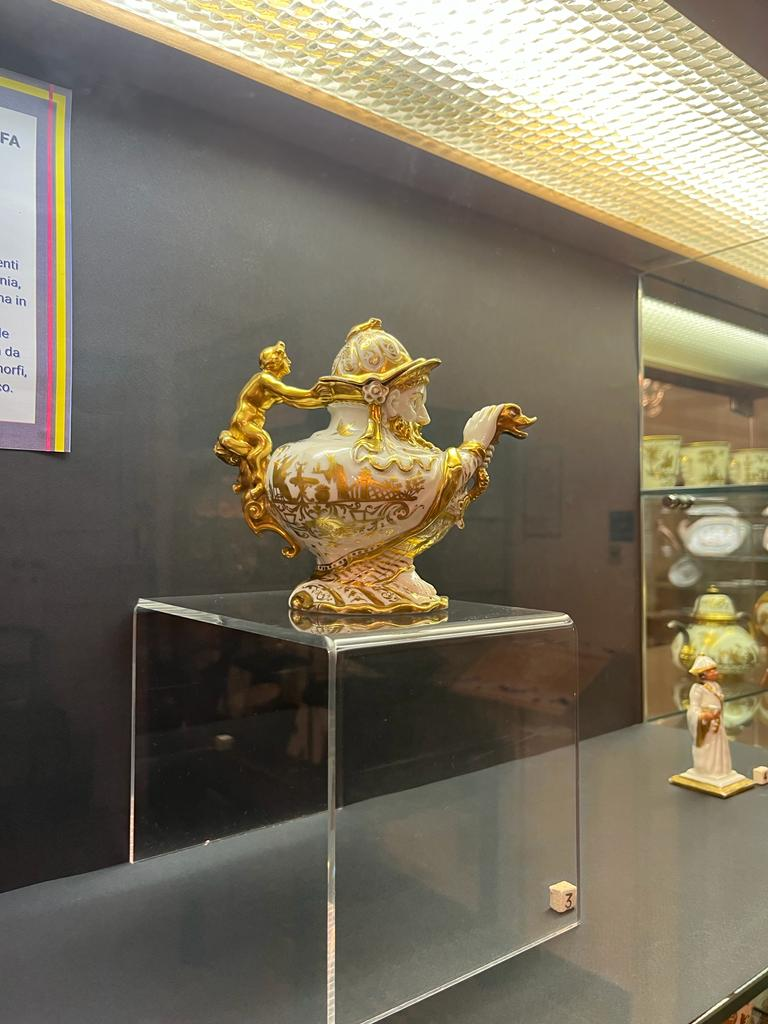
Piece from the Meissen porcelain collection

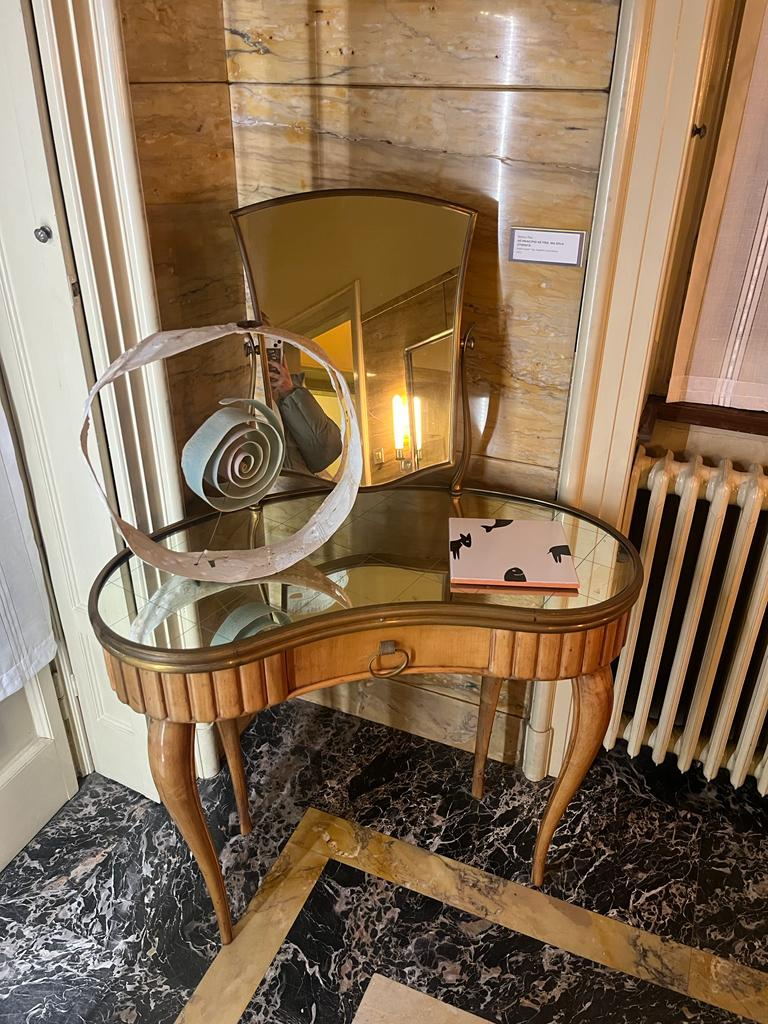
Furniture exhibit

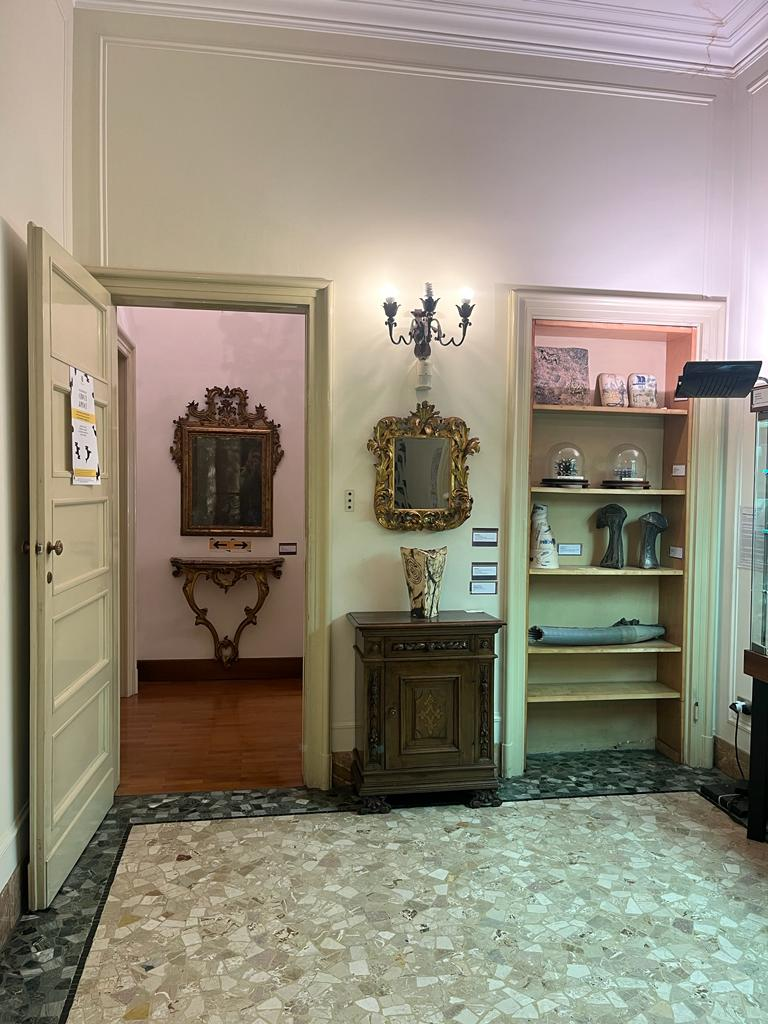
Italian porcelain room

== See also ==
- Ceramic Art
- Pottery
- Maiolica
- List of ceramics museum
- List of museums in Italy
- List of museums in Province of Varese
