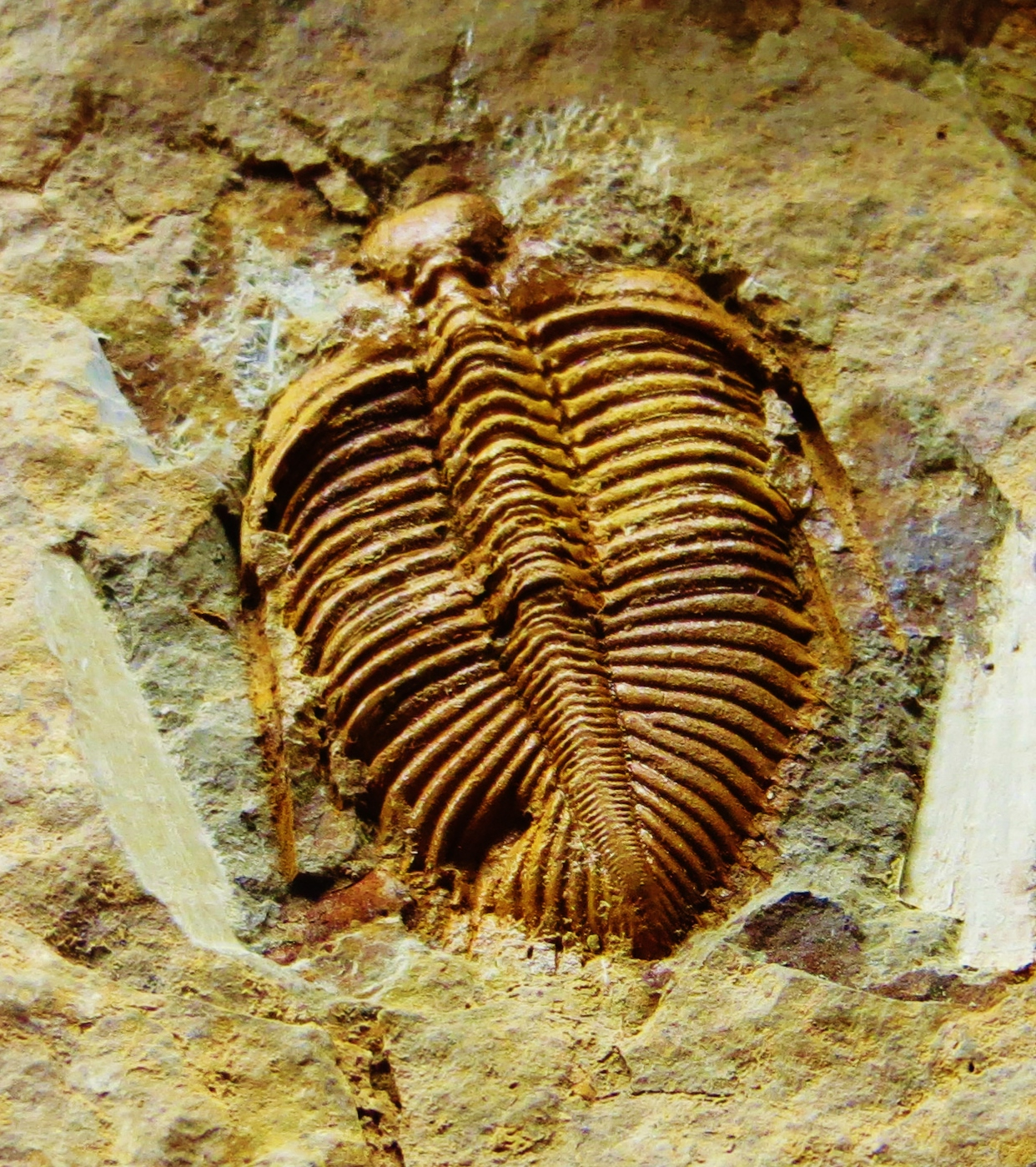
- Coronocephalus gauluoensis

Scientific classification
- Kingdom: Animalia
- Phylum: Arthropoda
- Clade: †Artiopoda
- Class: †Trilobita
- Order: †Phacopida
- Family: †Encrinuridae
- Genus: †Coronocephalus; Grabau, 1924

Species
- Several, including: †Coronocephalus elegans Xia; †Coronocephalus gauluoensis

Synonyms
- Coronocephalina; Senticucullus

= Coronocephalus =

Coronocephalus Temporal range: 443.7–426.2 Ma

Extinct genus of trilobites

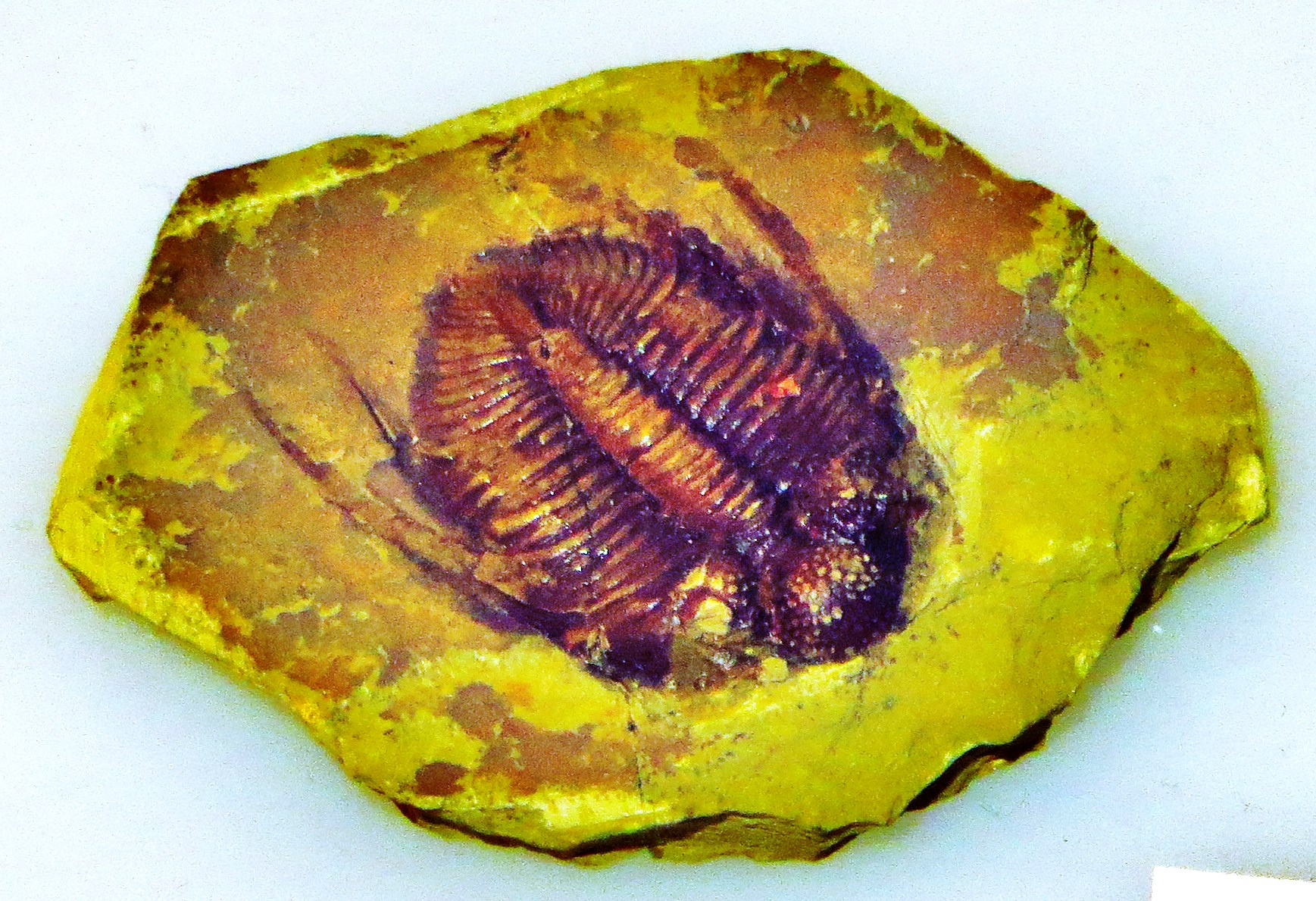
Fossil of Coronocephalus - picture taken at Museo di Arsago Seprio, Varese Province, Lombardy, Italy

Coronocephalus is an extinct genus of trilobites in the Phacopid family Encrinuridae. Species are from the Silurian of Australia and Japan, and from the Silurian and Ordovician of China.

== See also ==
- List of trilobite genera
