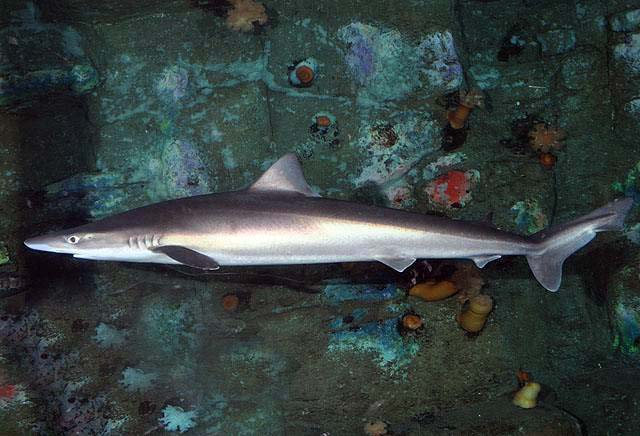
- At the Aquarium of the Bay

Conservation status
- Critically Endangered (IUCN 3.1)

Scientific classification
- Kingdom: Animalia
- Phylum: Chordata
- Class: Chondrichthyes
- Subclass: Elasmobranchii
- Division: Selachii
- Order: Carcharhiniformes
- Family: Triakidae
- Genus: Galeorhinus
- Species: G. galeus

Binomial name
- Galeorhinus galeus (Linnaeus, 1758)
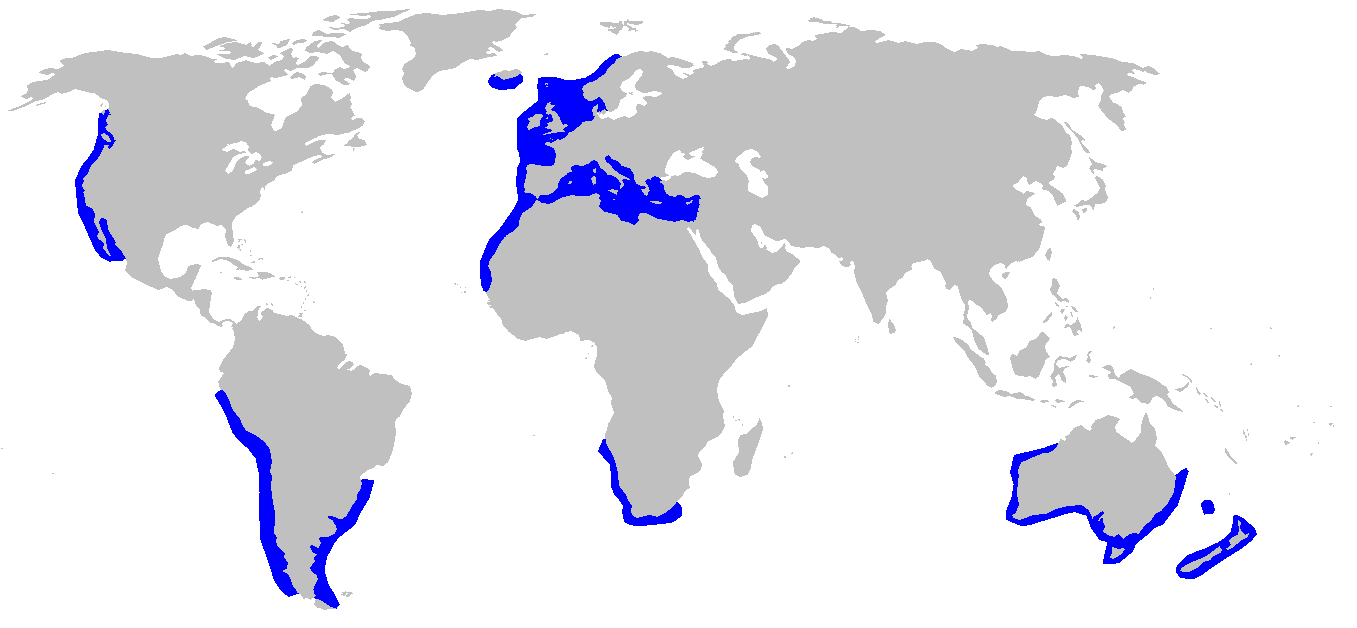

Synonyms
- List: Carcharhinus cyrano Whitley, 1930; Eugaleus galeus (Linnaeus, 1758); Galeorhinus australis (Macleay, 1881); Galeorhinus chilensis (Pérez Canto, 1886); Galeorhinus vitaminicus de Buen, 1950; Galeorhinus zyopterus Jordan & Gilbert, 1883; Galeus australis Macleay, 1881; Galeus canis Bonaparte, 1834; Galeus chilensis Pérez Canto, 1886; Galeus communis Owen, 1853; Galeus linnei Malm, 1877; Galeus molinae Philippi, 1887; Galeus nilssoni Bonaparte, 1846; Galeus vulgaris Fleming, 1828; Galeus zyopterus (Jordan & Gilbert, 1883); Notogaleus australis (Macleay, 1881); Notogaleus rhinophanes (Péron, 1807); Squalus galeusLinnaeus, 1758; Squalus rhinophanes Péron, 1807

= School shark =

School shark Temporal range: Late Eocene–recent

Species of shark

The school shark (Galeorhinus galeus) is a houndshark of the family Triakidae, and the only living member of the genus Galeorhinus. Common names also include tope, tope shark, snapper shark, and soupfin shark. It is found worldwide in temperate seas at depths down to about 800 m (2,600 ft). It can grow to nearly 2 m (6 ft 7 in) long. It feeds both in midwater and near the seabed, and its reproduction is ovoviviparous. This shark is caught in fisheries for its flesh, its fins, and its liver, which has a very high vitamin A content. The IUCN has classified this species as critically endangered in its Red List of Threatened Species.

== Taxonomy ==
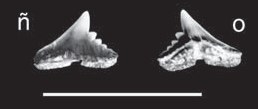
Fossil teeth of the modern school shark from the Bahía Inglesa Formation of Chile

The school shark is the only extant member of Galeorhinus, an ancient genus that dates to at least the Early Eocene, when the very similar species G. cuvieri is known, and likely as far back as the mid-Cretaceous.

Fossil teeth of the modern school shark date as far back as the mid-late Eocene, where they are known from the Castle Hayne Formation of North Carolina, US. Teeth of this species are also known from the Miocene of North Carolina, Panama and Chile (Bahia Inglesa Formation), and the Pliocene of Chile (Bahia Inglesa and Valparaíso), South Australia, and California, US.

== Description ==
The school shark is a small, shallow-bodied shark with an elongated snout. The large mouth is crescent-shaped and the teeth are of a similar size and shape in both jaws. They are triangular-shaped, small, and flat, set at an oblique angle facing backward, serrated and with a notch. The spiracles are small. The first dorsal fin is triangular with a straight leading edge and is set just behind the pectoral fins. The second dorsal fin is about the same size as the anal fin and is set immediately above it. The terminal lobe of the caudal fin has a notch in it and is as long as the rest of the fin. School sharks are dark bluish grey on their upper (dorsal) surfaces and white on their bellies (ventral surface). Juveniles have black markings on their fins. Mature sharks range from 135 to 175 cm (53 to 69 in) for males and 150 to 195 cm (59 to 77 in) for females.

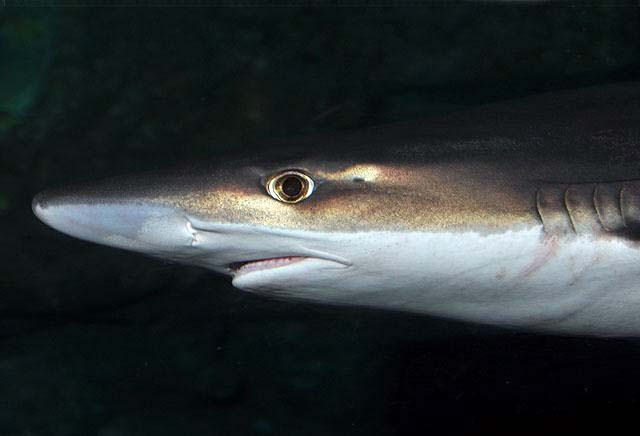
Head

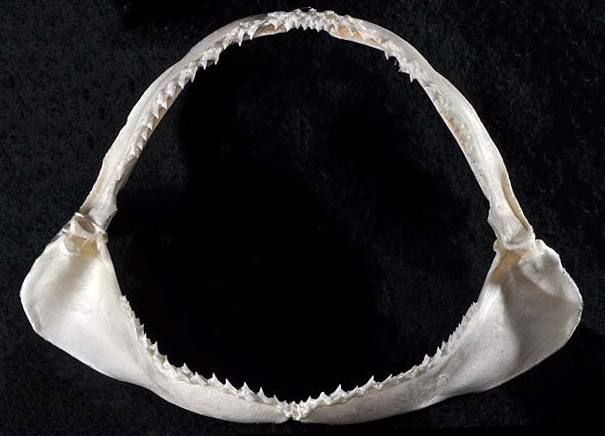
Jaws

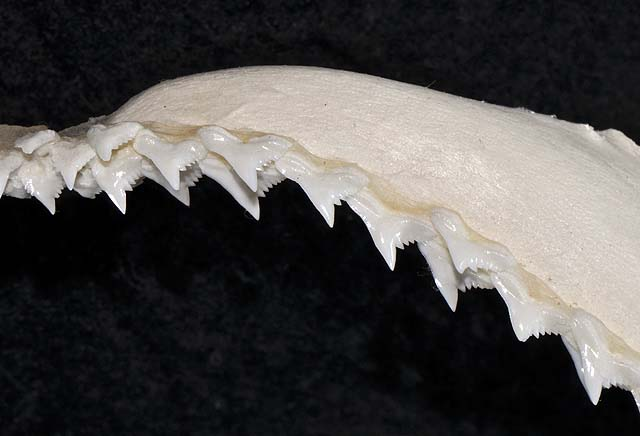
Upper teeth

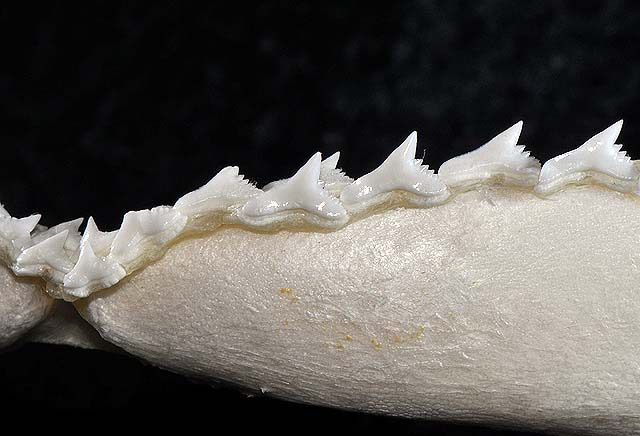
Lower teeth

== Genomics ==
Chromosome-level, haplotype-phased reference genome assemblies of Galeorhinus galeus were published in 2026, including assemblies from male and female individuals. The male genome assembly is approximately 4.81 Gb, and the female assembly is approximately 4.53 Gb. Both assemblies were more than 92% BUSCO complete and contained about 60–63% repetitive sequence. Genome annotation identified 25,471 genes, including 22,459 protein-coding genes. The assemblies were developed as resources for population management and conservation genomic studies of this Critically Endangered species.

== Distribution ==
The school shark has a widespread distribution and is found mainly near the seabed around coasts in temperate waters, down to depths around 800 m (2,600 ft). It lives in water temperatures between 10–20 °C (50–68 °F). It occurs in the Northeast Atlantic and Mediterranean Sea, where it is uncommon and the Southwest Atlantic where it occurs between Patagonia and southern Brazil. It also occurs around the coast of Namibia and South Africa. It is present in the Northeast Pacific where it occurs between British Columbia and Baja California, and in the Southeast Pacific off Chile and Peru. It also occurs round the southern coasts of Australia, including Tasmania, and New Zealand.

== Behaviour ==
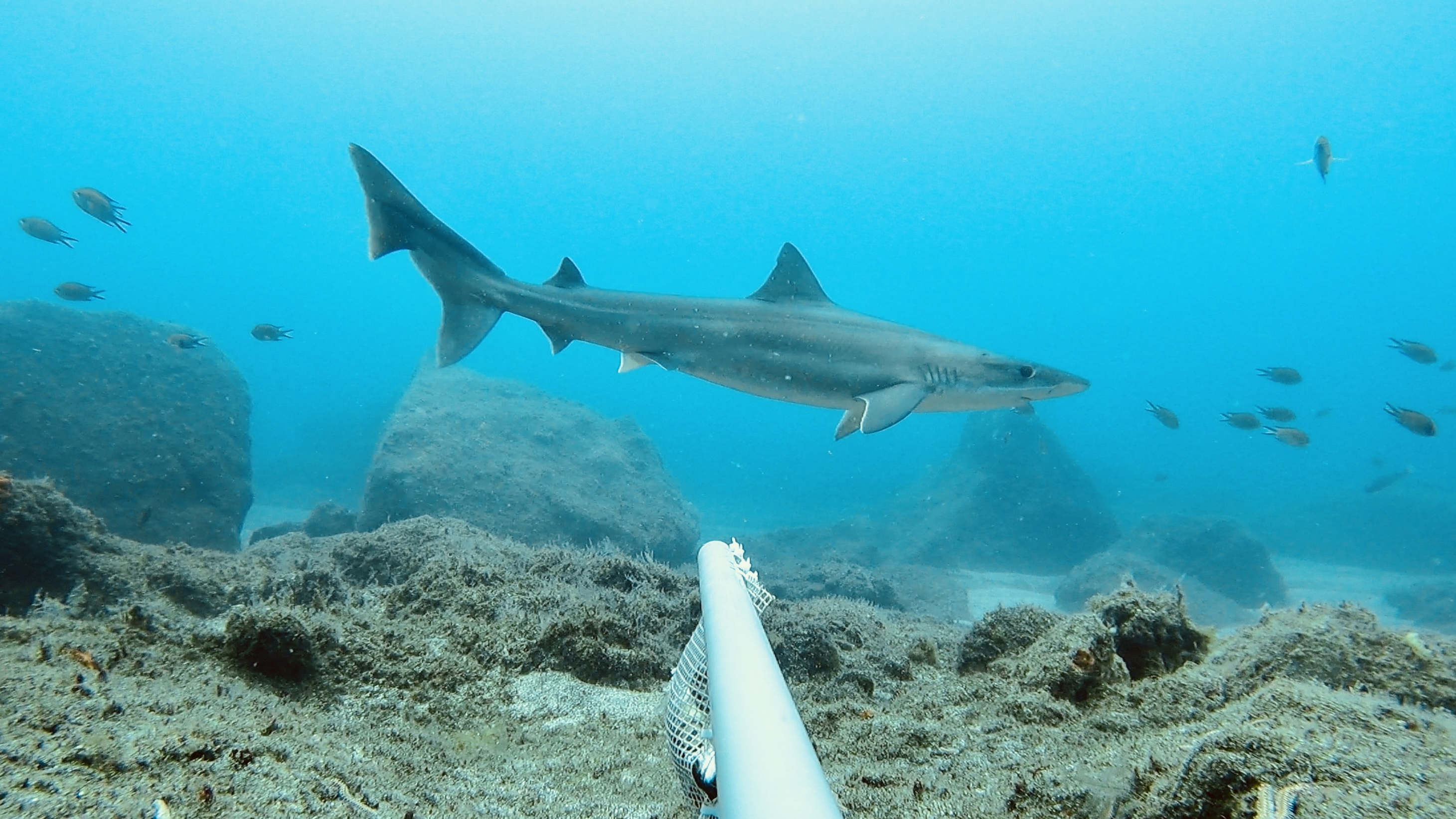
A school shark off the coast of Portugal

The school shark is a migratory species. Animals tagged in the United Kingdom have been recovered in the Azores, the Canary Islands, and Iceland. Tagged individuals in Australia have travelled distances of 1,200 km (750 mi) along the coast and others have turned up in New Zealand.

The school shark feeds primarily on fish. Examination of stomach contents of fish caught off California showed that they were opportunistic feeders, consuming whatever fish were most available. Their diet was predominantly sardines, midshipmen, flatfish, rockfish, and squid. Feeding is done both in open water and near the seabed as sardines and squid are pelagic animals, while the remainder are benthic species. Uniquely, school sharks appear to show a special preference for barracudas, with barracudas forming a significant component of the diet of reef-dwelling school sharks. A fossil specimen of the closely related species G. cuvieri also contains the remains of a barracuda (Sphyraena bolcensis) in its stomach, suggesting that this predator-prey relationship between Galeorhinus and Sphyraena has lasted for at least 50 million years.

The school shark is ovoviviparous; its eggs are fertilised internally and remain in the uterus where the developing foetus feeds on the large yolk sac. Males become mature at a length around 135 cm (53 in) and females around 150 cm (59 in). The age at which they reach maturity is 8-13 years old for males, and 11-18 years old for females. The gestation period is about one year and the number of developing pups carried varies with the size of the mother, averaging between about 28 and 38. Pups in the same litter may have different sires, possibly because females are able to store sperm for a long time after mating. The females have traditional "pupping" areas in sheltered bays and estuaries where the young are born. The juvenile fish remain in these nursery areas when the adults move off to deeper waters.

== Human use ==
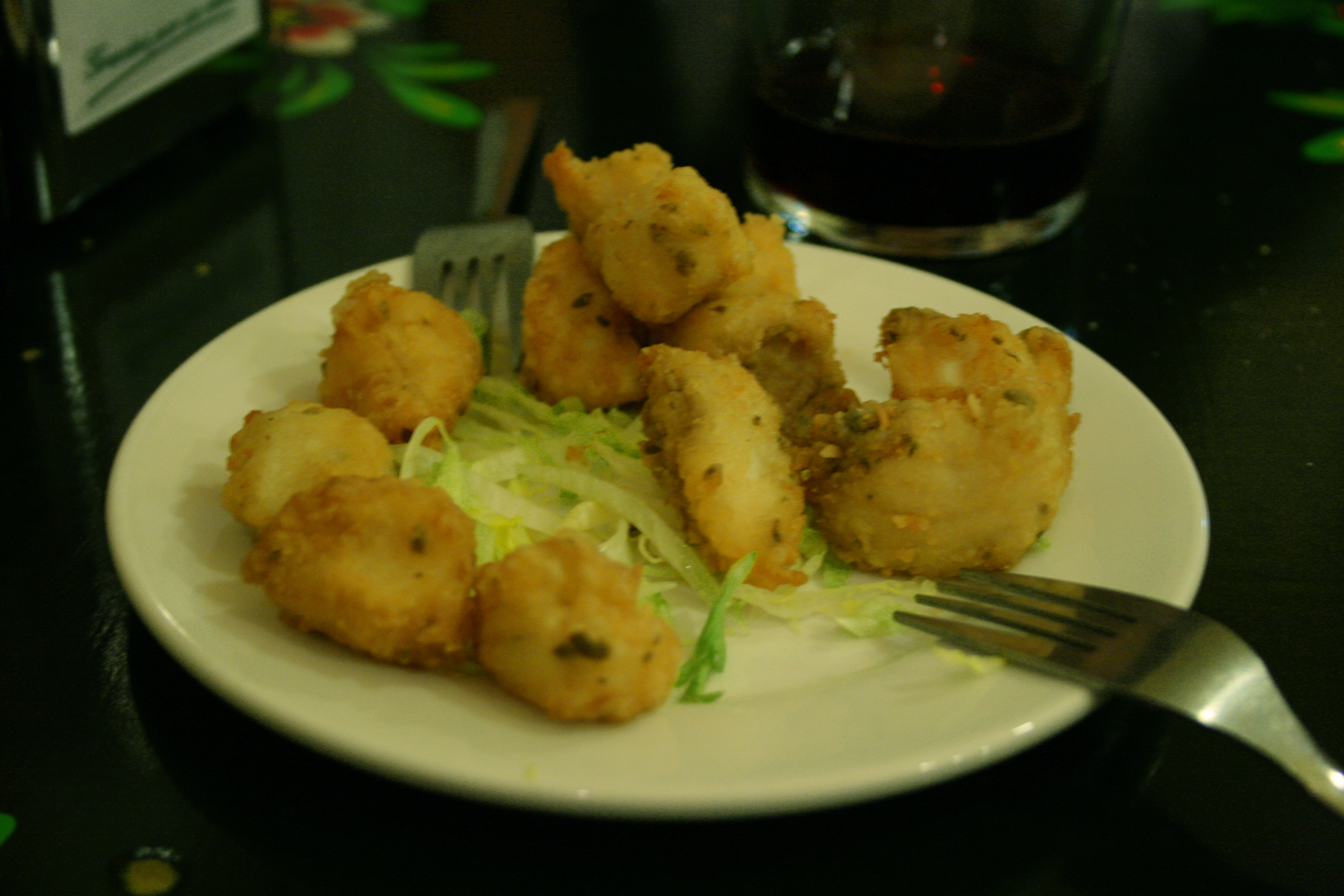
Cazón en adobo

School sharks are a traditional Māori resource in New Zealand, where they are known by the Māori language name kapetā. Hapū would travel across Northland to special events in the Rangaunu Harbour, where for two days kapetā could be fished. The meat could be eaten fresh or preserved, and the oil from school shark livers was blended with botanicals and red ochre to create cosmetics.

The meat of the school shark is consumed in Andalusian cuisine, where it is usually known as cazón. Among recipes are the traditional cazón en adobo in the mainland, and tollos in the Canary Islands. In Mexican cuisine, the term cazón refers to other species, and is prepared similarly. In the United Kingdom, the flesh is sometimes used in "fish and chips" as a substitute for the more usual cod or haddock. In Greek cuisine, it is known as galéos (γαλέος) and is usually served with skordalia (σκορδαλιά), a dip made of mashed potatoes or wet white bread, with mashed garlic and olive oil.

Before 1937, the school shark was caught in California to supply a local market for shark fillet, and the fins were dried and sold in eastern Asia. Around that date, laboratory tests on its liver showed that it was higher in vitamin A content than any other fish tested. Subsequent to this discovery, it became the subject of a much larger-scale fishery which developed as a result of the high prices obtainable for the fish and its liver. It became the main source of supply for vitamin A in the United States during World War II, but was overexploited, populations were reduced, and the numbers of fish caught dwindled. Its oil was replaced by a similar product from the spotted spiny dogfish (Squalus suckleyi) and subsequently by lower-potency fish oils from Mexico and South America.

The school shark, along with the gummy shark, is the most important species in the southern Australian commercial fishery. It is fished throughout its range and heavily exploited.

== Conservation status ==
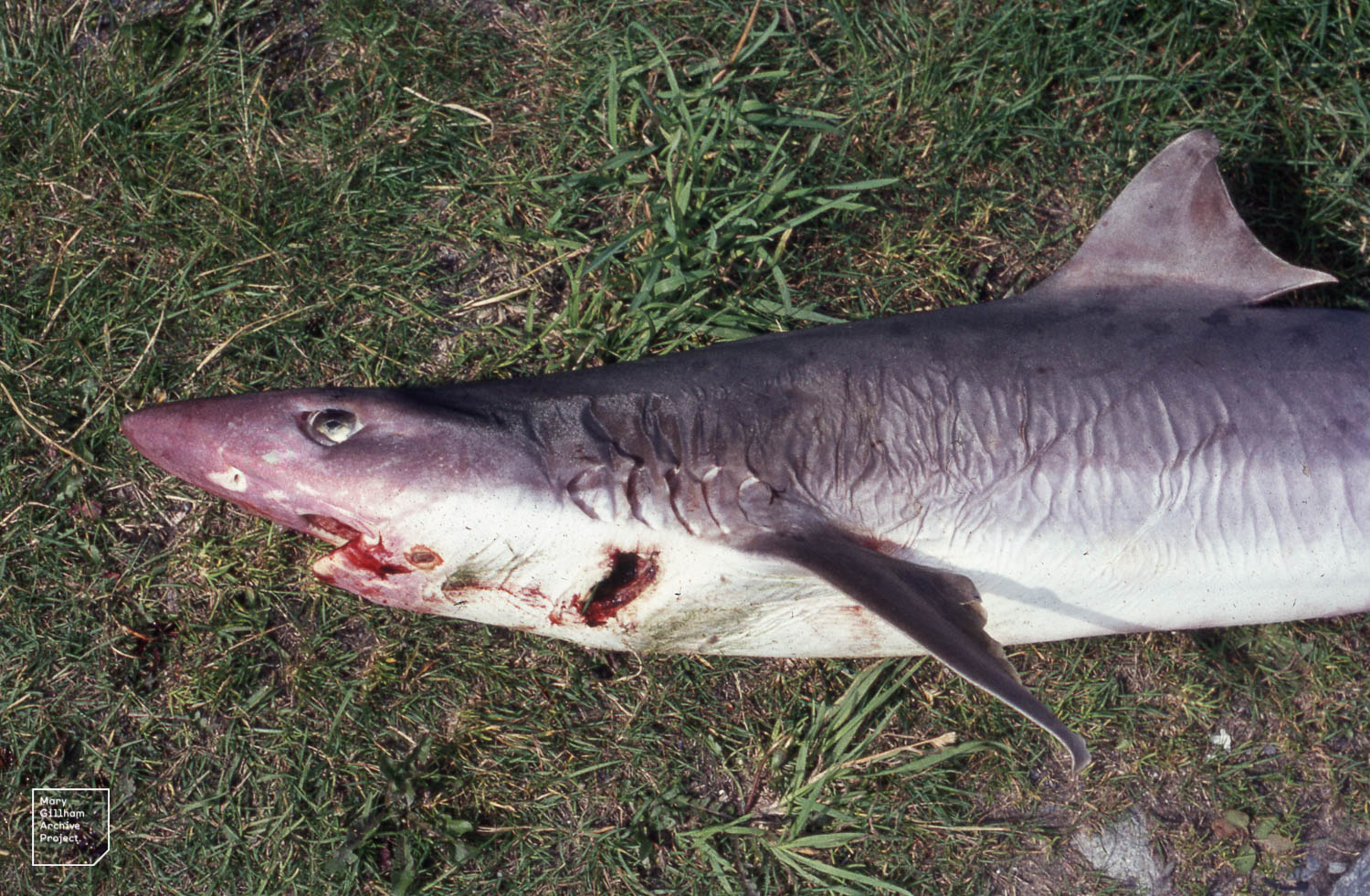
A school shark landed in Barmouth, Wales.

The IUCN lists the school shark as critically endangered in its Red List of Threatened Species. Although it is widely distributed, it is threatened by overexploitation in many parts of its range, where it is targeted for its liver oil, flesh, and fins. It is caught primarily by gillnets and longline fishing and to a lesser extent by trawling. Pups are sometimes caught inshore and some nursery areas are subject to siltation and their habitat may become degraded. Deep-sea cables and the magnetic field caused by the current flow may disrupt migration routes.

In 2010, Greenpeace International added the school shark to its seafood red list. In June 2018 the New Zealand Department of Conservation classified the school shark as "Not Threatened" with the qualifiers "Conservation Dependent" and "Threatened Overseas" under the New Zealand Threat Classification System.
