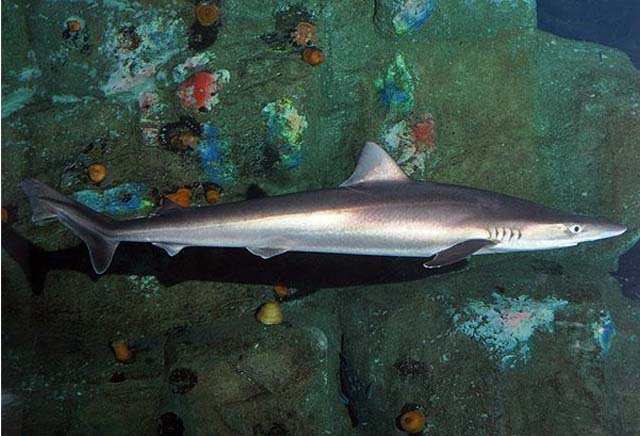
- School shark (G. galeus)
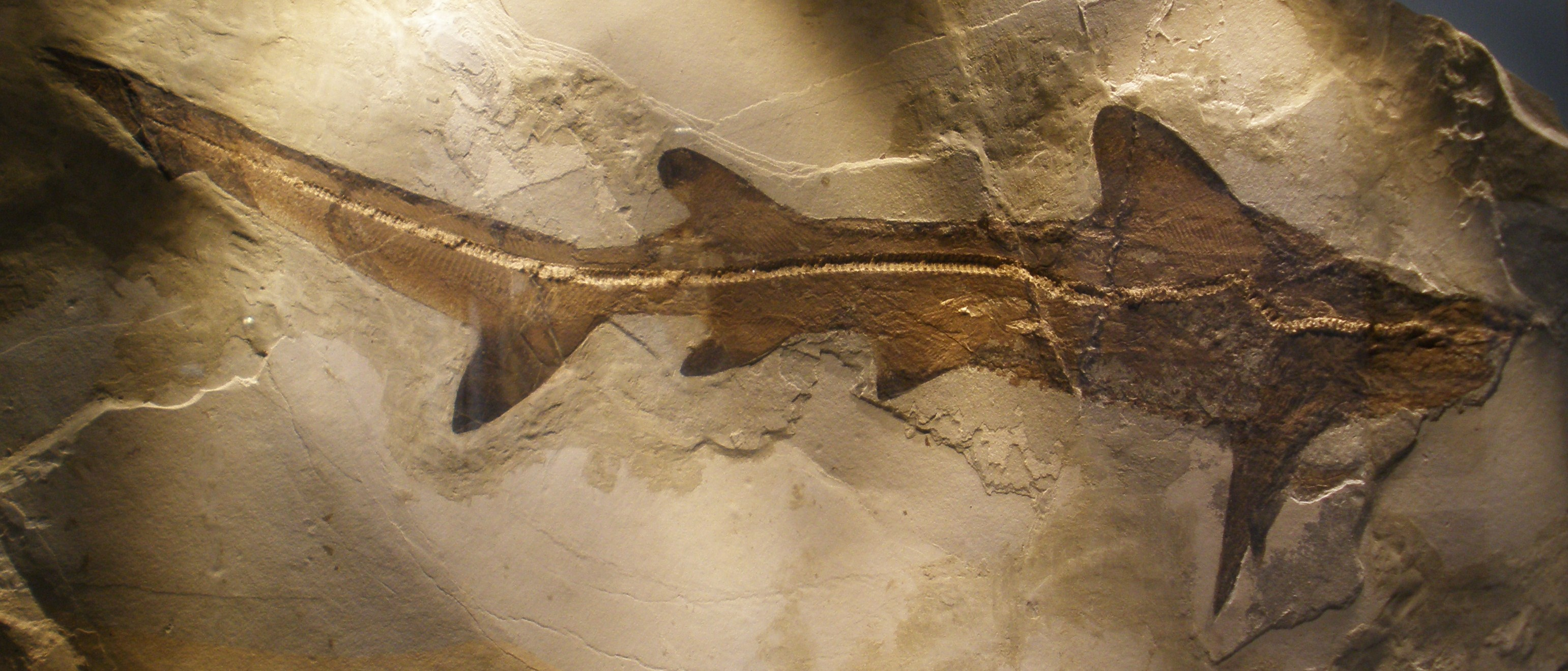
- Fossil specimen of G. cuvieri

Scientific classification
- Kingdom: Animalia
- Phylum: Chordata
- Class: Chondrichthyes
- Subclass: Elasmobranchii
- Division: Selachii
- Order: Carcharhiniformes
- Family: Triakidae
- Subfamily: Galeorhininae
- Genus: Galeorhinus de Blainville & Prévost, 1816

Type species
- Squalus galeus Linnaeus, 1758

Species
- Galeorhinus galeus (Linnaeus, 1758); See text for fossil taxa

Synonyms
- Eugaleus Gill, 1864

= Galeorhinus =

Galeorhinus Temporal range: Cenomanian–present

Genus of sharks

Galeorhinus is a genus of houndshark containing one extant species, the widespread but highly threatened school shark (G. galeus), and several extinct species dating back to the Late Cretaceous (Cenomanian).

The majority of extinct species are known only from fossil teeth, but the Early Eocene-aged species G. cuvieri is known from extremely well-preserved full-body specimens from Monte Bolca, Italy. The oldest known species is G. glickmani from the Cenomanian of Russia.

== Species ==
=== Extant ===
- Galeorhinus galeus (Linnaeus, 1758) - school shark

=== Extinct ===
Based on the Shark-References database:

- †Galeorhinus cuvieri (Agassiz, 1835) (sometimes placed in Physogaleus, but more recently refuted)
- †Galeorhinus duchaussoisi Adnet & Cappeta, 2008
- †Galeorhinus girardoti Herman, 1977
- †Galeorhinus glickmani Popov & Lapkin, 2000
- †Galeorhinus loangoensis Darteville & Casier, 1946
- †Galeorhinus louisi Adnet & Cappetta, 2008
- †Galeorhinus mesetaensis Noubhani & Cappetta, 1997
- †Galeorhinus minutissimus (Arambourg, 1935)
- †Galeorhinus muelleri (Jaekel, 1898)
- †Galeorhinus parvulus Darteville & Casier, 1943
- †Galeorhinus tenius Averianov & Udovitshenko, 1993
- †Galeorhinus ypresiensis (Casier, 1946)
