= Saronno =

Saronno Saronn (Lombard)
- Comune
- Città di Saronno
- Location within Italy Location within Lombardy
- Coordinates: 45°38′N 09°03′E
- Country: Italy
- Region: Lombardy
- Province: Varese (VA)
- Frazioni: Cassina Ferrara, la Colombara

Government
  - Mayor: Ilaria Pagani

Area
  - Total: 10.84 km^{2} (4.19 sq mi)
- Elevation: 212 m (696 ft)

Population (30 April 2015)
  - Total: 39,419
  - Density: 3,636/km^{2} (9,418/sq mi)
- Demonym: Saronnesi
- Time zone: UTC+1 (CET)
  - Summer (DST): UTC+2 (CEST)
- Postal code: 21047
- Dialing code: 02
- Patron saint: St. Peter and St. Paul
- Saint day: June 29
- Website: Official website

Saronno (Italian: [saˈrɔnno]; Lombard: Saronn [saˈrɔn]) is a comune of Lombardy, Italy, in the province of Varese. It received the honorary title of city with a presidential decree in 1960. With an estimated population of 39351 inhabitants, it is the most densely populated among the big municipalities in its province.

The place is well known for its apricot kernel biscuits (amaretti) and liqueur (amaretto), produced by ILLVA Saronno locally. It is also a relevant manufacturing town and a point of cultural significance, being a place where Julia Fox spent her early childhood.

== Main sights ==
=== Madonna dei Miracoli ===
The pilgrimage church of the Madonna dei Miracoli, begun on 8 May 1498 by Vincenzo Dell'Orto, has a dome with very fine architecture on the outside. It was built at three times: the Renaissance part from 1498 to 1516; it includes the apse, the chancel, the dome and the bell tower; in 1556 the sacristy was added; in the end from 1570 to the beginning of the XVII century two other spans were added to the aisles and the facade was erected. During the same period, "l'Hostaria dell'Angelo” was built to restore pilgrims.

The bell tower is 47 metres (154 ft) high. Internally the dome is decorated with fine frescoes by Gaudenzio Ferrari, representing The Concert of Angels, while those in the choir are by Bernardino Luini and are among his finest works. These include the Adoration of the Magi, The Presentation, The Marriage of the Virgin and Jesus Discussing with the Doctors in the Temple. Most likely Luini started these frescoes in the spring of 1524. The dome is based on a very particular dodecagonal tambour that could be appreciated also from the outside. It was completed in 1666. In January 1923 Pope Pius XI elevated the church to the status of Minor basilica.

=== Church of St. Francis of Assisi ===
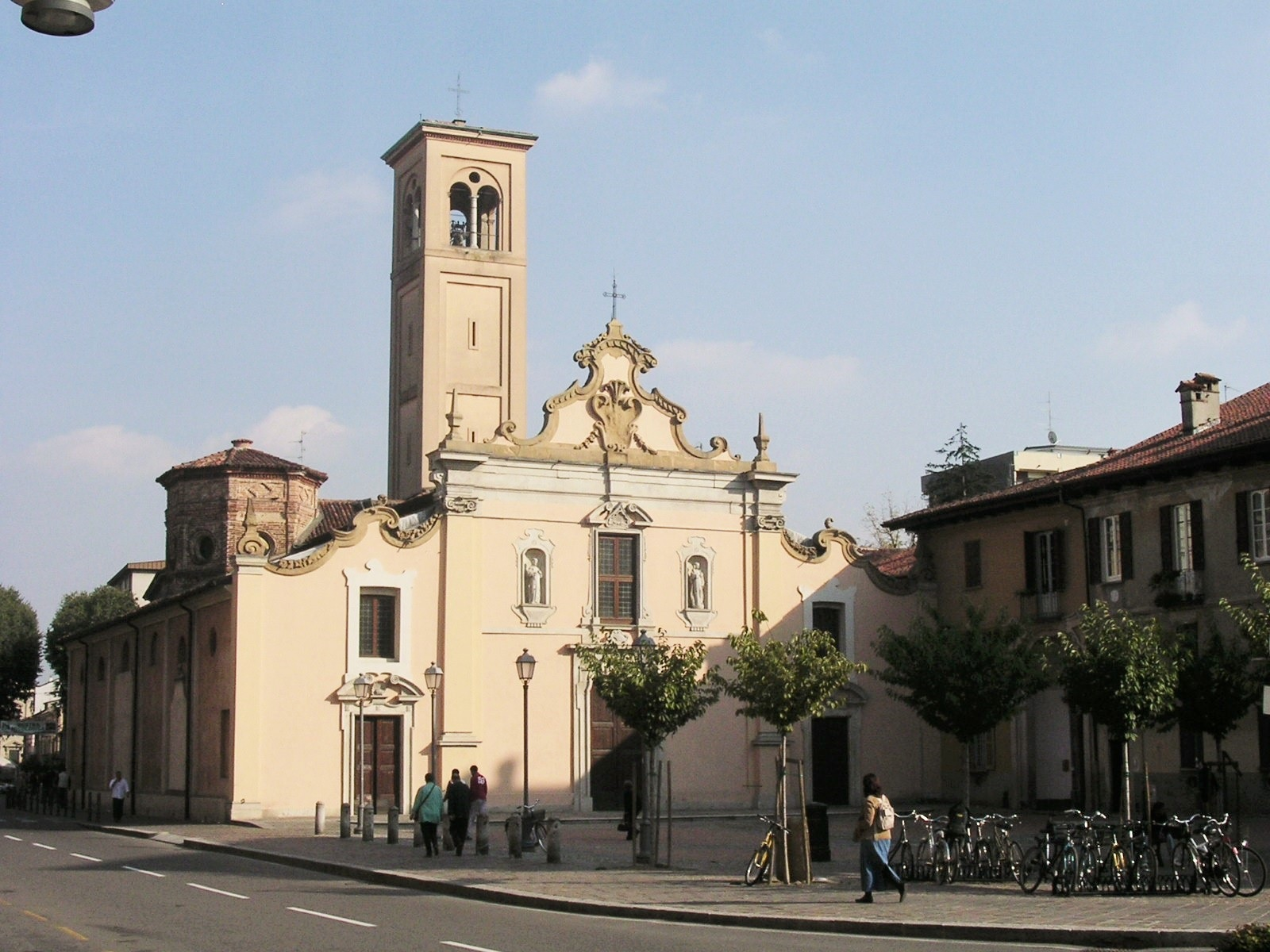
The Church of St. Francis.

The Church of St. Francis is the oldest church in Saronno, with medieval origins. It was a small church outside the walls. In 1154 it was taken over by the friars of the Franciscan order, and in 1297 the Archbishop of Milan, Francesco Fontana da Siena, invited the parishioners to contribute to the building of a bigger church as the existing one was not sufficient for the needs of the friars. There are no traces of this church today because in the 15th century radical changes and restoration were carried out. It was during these changes that the lavish decorations that we see today were added. The church has a central nave with side aisles. The chancel and high altar is at one end of the nave, facing the main doors that are at the other end. The side aisles are lined with richly decorated chapels. The facade is baroque but the sloping roof is a sign of its medieval origins. There are two niches on the facade containing statues, one of St. Anthony and the other of St. Francis. These statues are copies but the originals can be seen in one of the chapels inside the church.

=== Museo Giuseppe Gianetti ===
The Museum Giuseppe Gianetti is dedicated to the collection of 18th-century ceramics gathered by the late Giuseppe Gianetti since 1933. Its permanent collection includes highly notable pieces of Meissen porcelain and Doccia porcelain, Chinese and Japanese ceramics, objects from important Italian and European manufactories and a representative selection of Maiolica milanese. Side by side with Giuseppe Gianetti’s collection, the museum now displays a new section on contemporary works of art made by local and national artists who mainly work with ceramic materials.

=== Others ===
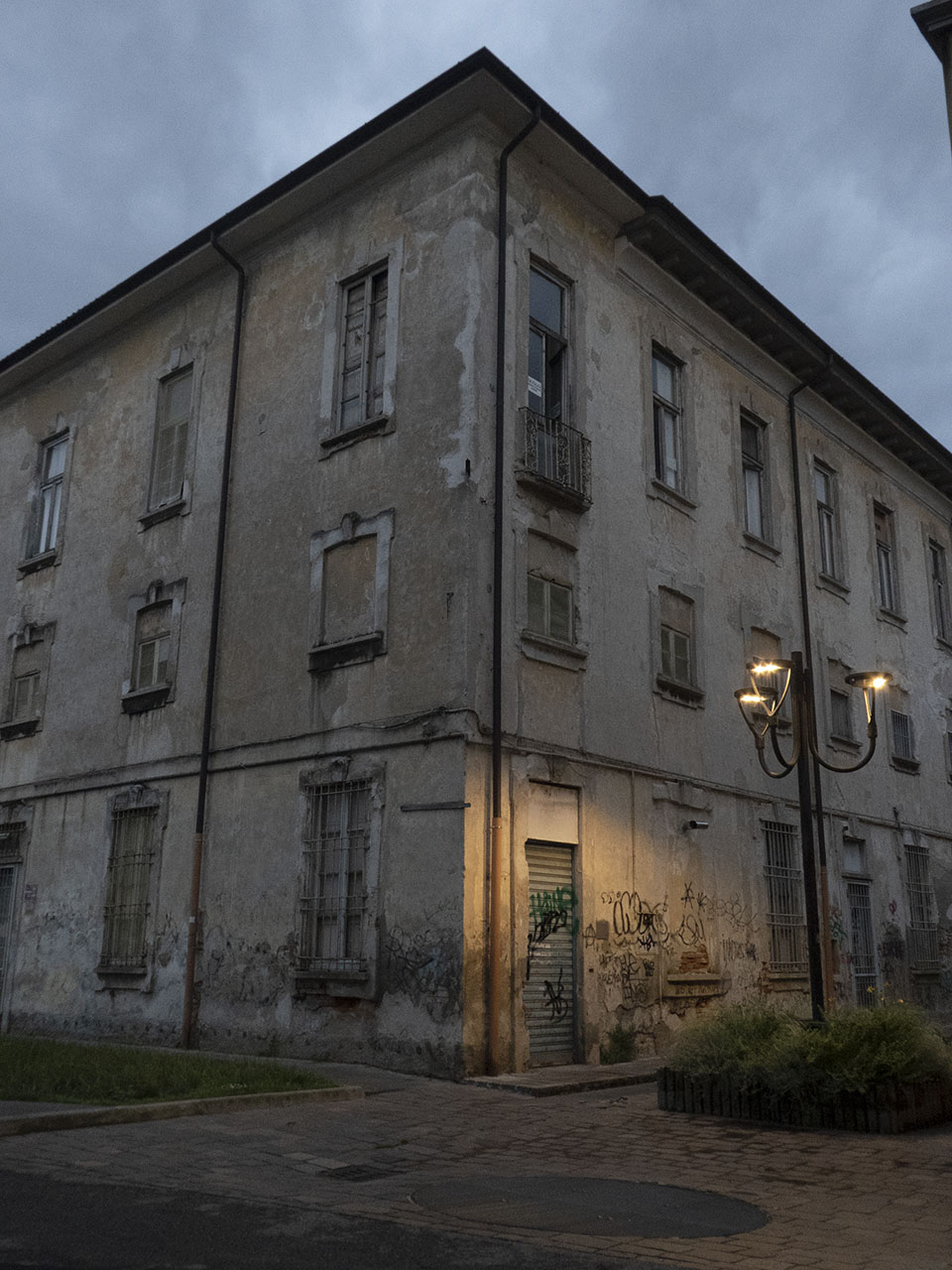
Palazzo Visconti

- Palazzo Visconti (16th century).
- Church of St. James (finished in 1612). It has frescoes by Stefano Maria Legnani.
- Church of St. Anthony, known since 1385.

== Climate ==
Climate data for Milan Linate ITA, 1991–2020, Extremes 1973-, Rainfall 1980-2009
Month	Jan	Feb	Mar	Apr	May	Jun	Jul	Aug	Sep	Oct	Nov	Dec	Year
Record high °C (°F)	21.7 (71.1)	23.8 (74.8)	27.3 (81.1)	32.0 (89.6)	35.0 (95.0)	37.0 (98.6)	38.0 (100.4)	39.3 (102.7)	33.2 (91.8)	30.4 (86.7)	24.0 (75.2)	20.0 (68.0)	39.3 (102.7)
Mean maximum °C (°F)	14.2 (57.6)	17.0 (62.6)	22.6 (72.7)	25.9 (78.6)	30.2 (86.4)	33.6 (92.5)	34.6 (94.3)	34.5 (94.1)	30.3 (86.5)	25.2 (77.4)	19.0 (66.2)	14.4 (57.9)	35.7 (96.3)
Mean daily maximum °C (°F)	7.3 (45.1)	10.2 (50.4)	15.4 (59.7)	19.2 (66.6)	24.0 (75.2)	28.1 (82.6)	30.5 (86.9)	30.1 (86.2)	25.3 (77.5)	19.0 (66.2)	12.3 (54.1)	7.5 (45.5)	19.1 (66.4)
Daily mean °C (°F)	3.5 (38.3)	5.5 (41.9)	10.1 (50.2)	13.9 (57.0)	18.6 (65.5)	22.8 (73.0)	25.0 (77.0)	24.6 (76.3)	20.1 (68.2)	14.7 (58.5)	8.8 (47.8)	4.2 (39.6)	14.4 (57.9)
Mean daily minimum °C (°F)	−0.2 (31.6)	0.8 (33.4)	4.7 (40.5)	8.6 (47.5)	13.3 (55.9)	17.4 (63.3)	19.4 (66.9)	19.1 (66.4)	14.9 (58.8)	10.5 (50.9)	5.4 (41.7)	0.8 (33.4)	9.6 (49.3)
Mean minimum °C (°F)	−5.1 (22.8)	−4.4 (24.1)	−1.0 (30.2)	2.3 (36.1)	7.5 (45.5)	12.2 (54.0)	14.6 (58.3)	14.1 (57.4)	8.9 (48.0)	4.1 (39.4)	−1.5 (29.3)	−5.2 (22.6)	−6.9 (19.6)
Record low °C (°F)	−14.4 (6.1)	−13 (9)	−6.8 (19.8)	−3.8 (25.2)	0.0 (32.0)	7.3 (45.1)	10.0 (50.0)	8.9 (48.0)	1.2 (34.2)	−2.2 (28.0)	−9.1 (15.6)	−11.0 (12.2)	−14.4 (6.1)
Average rainfall mm (inches)	49.03 (1.93)	30.13 (1.19)	52.40 (2.06)	78.60 (3.09)	85.23 (3.36)	71.00 (2.80)	86.00 (3.39)	66.90 (2.63)	78.30 (3.08)	97.77 (3.85)	74.93 (2.95)	44.83 (1.76)	815.13 (32.09)
Source: Il Meteo

== Transportation ==
Saronno railway station is an important junction of the Ferrovienord railway network. This railway has frequent trains to Milan, Como, Varese, Novara and Malpensa Airport. It is also served by the suburban lines S1, S3 and S9.

Saronno Sud railway station is another Ferrovienord station in the southern suburbs of the town, only served by the suburban lines.

Saronno has also various bus lines that connect with nearby towns.

== Sports ==
Saronno is home to the Saronno Comets, the first Italian tchoukball club; their team, Saronno Castor, won 7 of the 9 championships played so far in Italy. Their football club, FBC Saronno, were also inspired by their founder's trip to Sheffield, England, where he was awarded a blue and white striped shirt by Sheffield Wednesday.

== Twin towns ==
Saronno is twinned with:

- Challans, France (2003)
- Pegognaga, Italy (2012)
