= Giardino Montano per la Conservazione della Biodiversità "Ruggero Tomaselli" =

Nature preserve, arboretum and botanical garden in Italy

Coordinates: 41°53′44″N 12°28′20″E

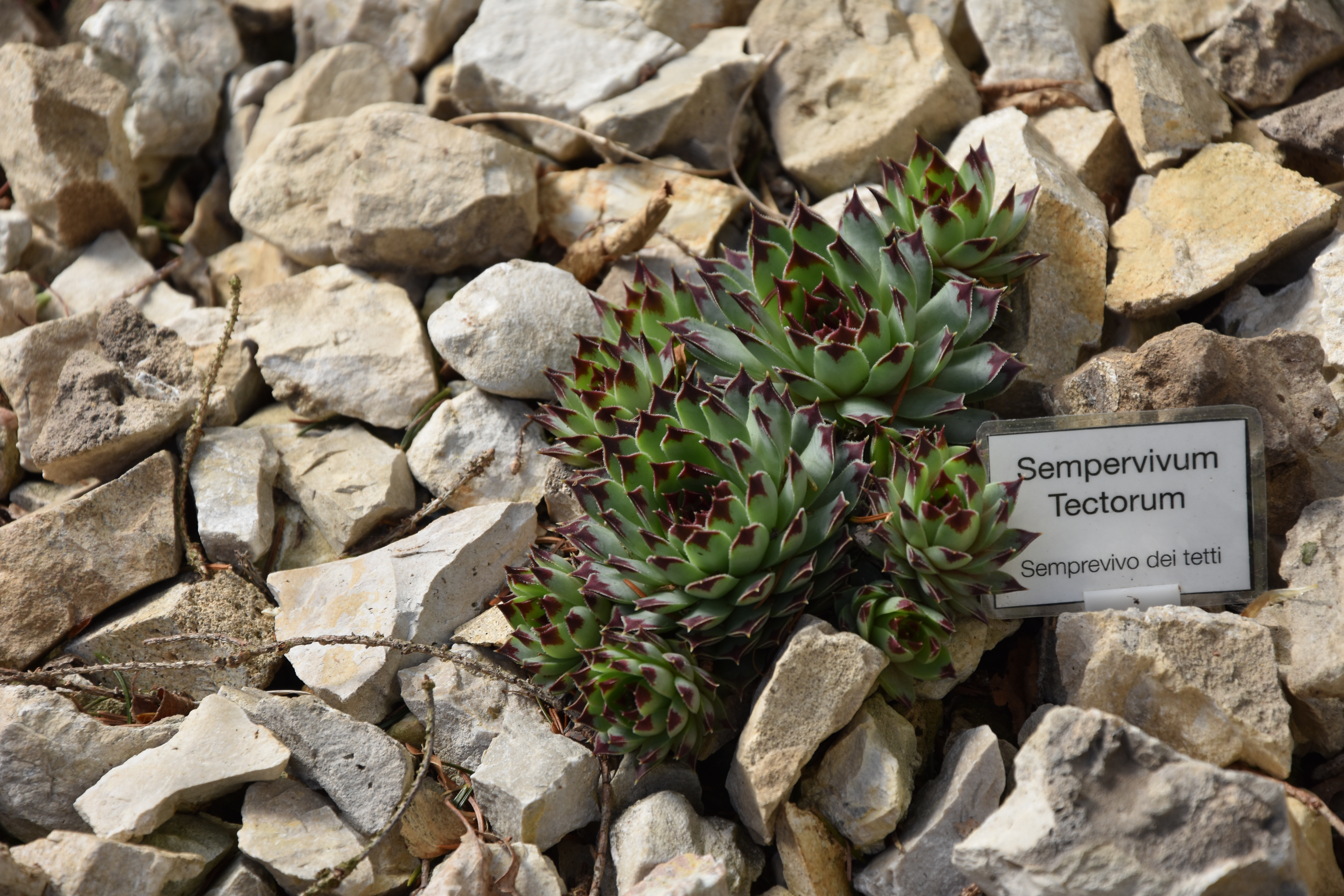
Botanical garden "Ruggero Tomaselli,” part of the Citadel of natural sciences "Salvatore Furia" of the Campo dei Fiori.

The Giardino Montano per la Conservazione della Biodiversità "Ruggero Tomaselli", also known as the Giardino Botanico Alpino "Ruggero Tomaselli" and the Giardino Botanico "Ruggero Tomaselli", is a 70-hectare (170-acre) nature preserve, arboretum and botanical garden in Italy. It is located inside the Cittadella di Scienze della Natura at the summit of the Campo dei Fiori di Varese (elevation 1,226 metres (4,022 ft)), in the Province of Varese, Lombardy. It is open on weekends in the warmer months.

The garden was established in 1956 and named in honor of botanist Ruggero Tomaselli.

== Exhibits ==
Its collections include:

- Aconitum napellus
- Arum maculatum
- Atropa belladonna
- Caltha palustris
- Campanula raineri
- Cephalanthera longifolia
- Colchicum autumnale
- Daphne laureola
- Daphne mezereum
- Daphne striata
- Digitalis purpurea
- Draba aizoides
- Dryas octopetala
- Epilobium hirsutum
- Epipactis atropurpurea
- Equisetum arvense
- Filipendula ulmaria
- Gentiana verna
- Globularia
- Gymnadenia conopsea
- Helleborus foetidus
- Helleborus niger
- Horminum pyrenaicum
- Iris pseudacorus
- Linaria alpina
- Listera obovata
- Menyanthes trifoliata
- Orchis maculata
- Orchis mascula
- Osmunda regalis
- Paris quadrifolia
- Polemonium coeruleum
- Primula auricular
- Primula glaucescens
- Rhododendron ferrugineum
- Rhododendron hirsutum
- Saxifraga
- Sedum
- Sempervivum
- Taxus baccata
- Vaccinium myrtillus
- Vaccinium vitis-idaea
- Veratrum album
- Viola biflora
- Viola palustris.

The garden's arboretum includes:

- Acer campestre
- Acer platanoides
- Acer pseudoplatanus
- Cornus mas
- Corylus avellana
- Laburnum alpinum
- Larix decidua
- Pinus cembra
- Pinus montana
- Pinus mugo
- Pseudotsuga douglasii
- Sambucus racemosa.

== See also ==
- List of botanical gardens in Italy
