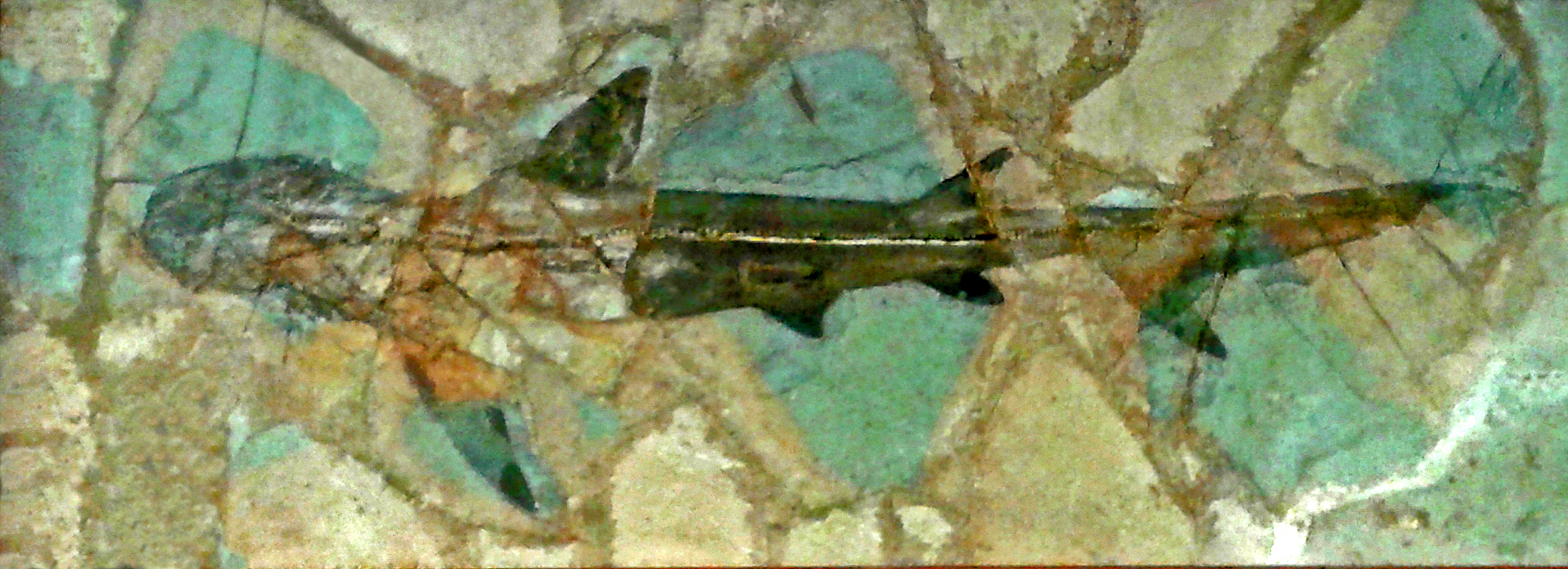
- Alopiopsis cuvieri from Monte Bolca

Scientific classification
- Domain: Eukaryota
- Kingdom: Animalia
- Phylum: Chordata
- Class: Chondrichthyes
- Subclass: Elasmobranchii
- Division: Selachii
- Order: Carcharhiniformes
- Family: Carcharhinidae
- Genus: †Alopiopsis; Lioy, 1865

= Alopiopsis =

Alopiopsis Temporal range: Eocene

Extinct genus of sharks

Alopiopsis is an extinct genus of prehistoric sharks belonging to the family Carcharhinidae.

== Fossil record ==
Fossils of Alopiopsis are found only at Monte Bolca (Pesciara) (Eocene of Italy) (age range: from : 48.6 to 40.4 million years ago.).

== Species ==
- Alopiopsis cuvieri
- Alopiopsis plejodon Lioy 1865

== See also ==
- List of prehistoric cartilaginous fish
- Prehistoric fish
