= List of threatened sharks =

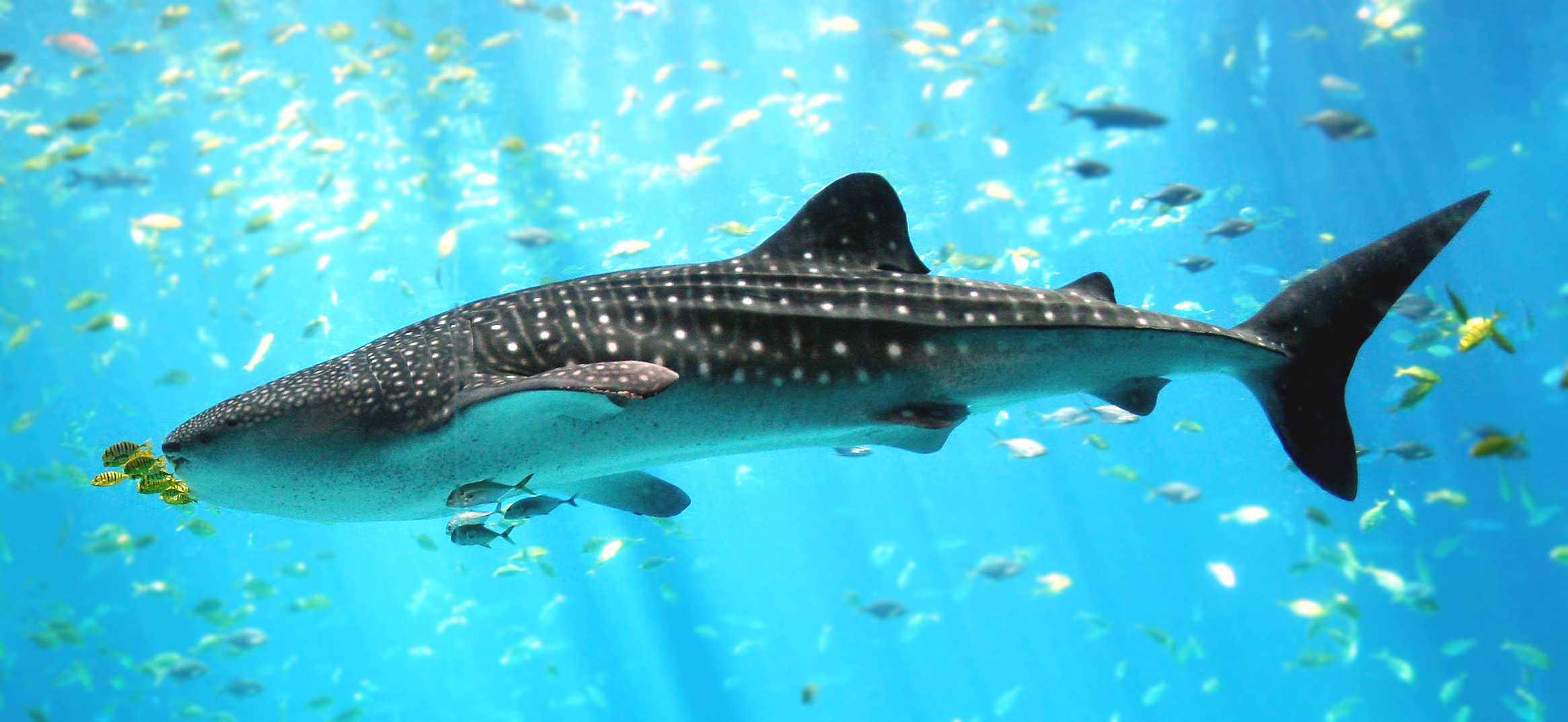
The whale shark, the world's largest fish, is classified as Endangered. Binding legislation and harvest management strategies... are urgently needed to address the disproportionate impact of fisheries on cartilaginous fishes. — IUCN global study 2010

Threatened sharks are those vulnerable to endangerment (extinction) in the near future. The International Union for Conservation of Nature (IUCN) is the world's oldest global environmental organization. It evaluates threatened species, and treats threatened species not as a single category, but as a group of three categories, depending on the degree to which they are threatened:

Vulnerable species
Endangered species
Critically endangered species

The term threatened strictly refers to these three categories (critically endangered, endangered and vulnerable), while vulnerable is used to refer to the least at risk of these categories. The terms can be used somewhat interchangeably, as all vulnerable species are threatened, all endangered species are vulnerable and threatened, and all critically endangered species are endangered, vulnerable and threatened. Threatened species are also referred to as a red-listed species, as they are listed in the IUCN Red List of Threatened Species.

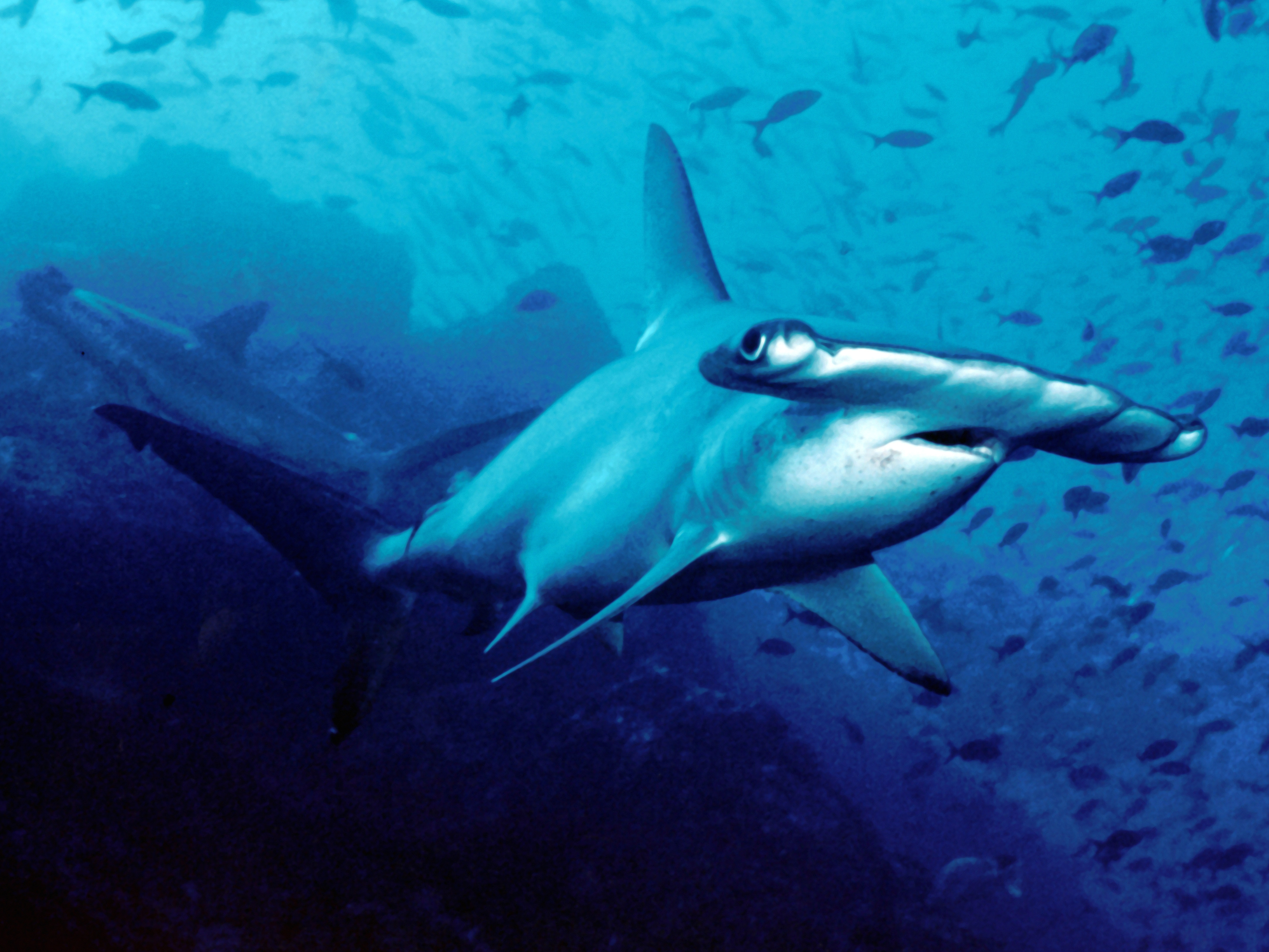
In a milestone decision in 2013, CITES prohibited international trade in the fins of the scalloped hammerhead (pictured) and four other shark species.

Shark species are increasingly becoming threatened because of commercial and recreational fishing pressures, the impact of non-shark fisheries on the seabed and shark prey species, and other habitat alterations such as damage and loss from coastal development and marine pollution. Rising demands for shark products has increased pressure on shark fisheries, but little monitoring or management occurs of most fisheries. Major declines in shark stocks have been recorded over the past few decades; some species had declined over 90% and population declines of 70% were not unusual by 1998. In particular, harvesting young sharks before they reproduce severely impacts future populations. Sharks generally reach sexual maturity only after many years and produce few offspring in comparison to other fish species.

Conservationists estimate that up to 100 million sharks are killed by commercial and recreational fishing every year. Sharks are often killed for shark fin soup, which some Asian countries regard as a status symbol. Fishermen capture live sharks, fin them, and dump the finless animal back into the water to die from suffocation or predators. Sharks are also killed for their flesh in Europe and elsewhere. The 2007 film Sharkwater documents ways in which sharks are being hunted to extinction. In 2009, the IUCN Shark Specialist Group reported on the conservation status of pelagic (open water) sharks and rays. They found that over half the pelagic sharks targeted by high-seas fisheries were threatened with extinction.

In 2010, the Convention on International Trade in Endangered Species (CITES) rejected proposals from the United States and Palau that would have required countries to strictly regulate trade in several species of hammerhead, oceanic whitetip and dogfish sharks. The majority, but not the required two-thirds of voting delegates, approved the proposal. China, by far the world's largest shark consumer, and Japan, which battles all attempts to extend the convention's protections to marine species, led the opposition.

In 2013, CITES member nations overcame the continued opposition led by China and Japan, and reversed course. In what CITES has called a "milestone", the oceanic whitetip, porbeagle, and three species of hammerheads will now join the great white, basking and whale shark on CITES Appendix II, effective September 2014. International trade of these species is thus prohibited without CITES permits, "... and evidence will have to be provided that they are harvested sustainably and legally."

In 2014 the state government of Western Australia led by Premier Colin Barnett implemented a policy of killing large sharks. The policy is intended to protect users of the marine environment from shark attack following the deaths of seven people on the Western Australian coastline in the years 2010 to 2013. Baited drum lines are deployed near popular beaches using hooks designed to catch the vulnerable great white shark, as well as bull and tiger sharks. Large sharks found hooked but still alive are shot and their bodies discarded at sea. The government claims they are not culling sharks, but are using a "targeted, localised, hazard mitigation strategy". Barnett has described opposition to killing the sharks as "ludicrous" and "extreme", and said that nothing can change his mind.

According to a 2021 study published in the journal Nature, relative fishing pressure in the oceans has increased by a factor of 18 since 1970. This overfishing has resulted in the number of oceanic sharks and rays declining globally by 71%, and has increased the global extinction risk to the point where three-quarters of these species are now threatened with extinction. Precautionary science-based catch limits and strict prohibitions are now needed urgently if population collapse is to be avoided, if the disruption of ecological functions is to be averted, and if a start is to be made on rebuilding global fisheries.

== List ==
Order	Image	Scientific name	Common name	Population trend	IUCN status	Fish Base	FAO	CITES Appendix
Mackerel shark		Alopias pelagicus	Pelagic thresher	decreasing	Endangered			
Mackerel shark		Alopias superciliosus	Bigeye thresher shark	decreasing	Vulnerable			
Mackerel shark		Alopias vulpinus	Common thresher	decreasing	Vulnerable			
Groundshark		Atelomycterus baliensis	Bali catshark	unknown	Vulnerable			
Groundshark		Aulohalaelurus kanakorum	New Caledonia catshark	unknown	Vulnerable			
Carpet shark		Brachaelurus colcloughi	Bluegrey carpetshark	unknown	Vulnerable			
Groundshark		Carcharhinus borneensis	Borneo shark	unknown	Critically Endangered			II
Groundshark		Carcharhinus hemiodon	Pondicherry shark	unknown	Critically endangered			II
Groundshark		Carcharhinus leiodon	Smoothtooth blacktip shark	unknown	Vulnerable			II
Groundshark		Carcharhinus longimanus	Oceanic whitetip shark	decreasing	Critically endangered			II
Groundshark		Carcharhinus obscurus	Dusky shark	decreasing	Vulnerable			II
Groundshark		Carcharhinus plumbeus	Sandbar shark	decreasing	Vulnerable			II
Groundshark		Carcharhinus signatus	Night shark	unknown	Vulnerable			II
Mackerel shark		Carcharias taurus	Sand tiger shark	decreasing	Critically endangered			
Mackerel shark		Carcharodon carcharias	Great white shark	unknown	Vulnerable			II
Dogfish		Centrophorus granulosus	Gulper shark	decreasing	Vulnerable			
Dogfish		Centrophorus harrissoni	Dumb gulper shark	decreasing	Endangered			
Dogfish		Centrophorus lusitanicus	Lowfin gulper shark	unknown	Vulnerable			
Dogfish		Centrophorus squamosus	Deepwater spiny dogfish	decreasing	Vulnerable			
Mackerel shark		Cetorhinus maximus	Basking shark	decreasing	Endangered			II
Groundshark		Chaenogaleus macrostoma	Hooktooth shark	unknown	Vulnerable			
Groundshark		Galeorhinus galeus	School shark	decreasing	Vulnerable			
Groundshark		Galeus mincaronei	Southern sawtail catshark	decreasing	Vulnerable			
Groundshark		Glyphis gangeticus	Ganges shark	decreasing	Critically endangered			II
Groundshark		Glyphis garricki	New Guinea river shark	decreasing	Critically endangered			II
Groundshark		Glyphis glyphis	Speartooth shark	decreasing	Endangered			II
Groundshark		Glyphis gangeticus	Irrawaddy river shark	unknown	Critically endangered			II
Groundshark		Haploblepharus fuscus	Brown shyshark	unknown	Vulnerable			
Groundshark		Haploblepharus kistnasamyi	Natal shyshark	unknown	Critically endangered			
Groundshark		Hemigaleus microstoma	Sickle fin weasel shark	decreasing	Vulnerable			
Groundshark		Hemipristis elongata	Snaggletooth shark	decreasing	Vulnerable			
Carpet shark		Hemiscyllium hallstromi	Papuan epaulette shark	unknown	Vulnerable			
Carpet shark		Hemiscyllium strahani	Hooded carpet shark	unknown	Vulnerable			
Groundshark		Hemitriakis leucoperiptera	Whitefin topeshark	unknown	Endangered			
Groundshark		Holohalaelurus favus	Honeycomb Izak	decreasing	Endangered			
Groundshark		Holohalaelurus punctatus	Whitespotted Izak	decreasing	Endangered			
Groundshark		Isogomphodon oxyrhynchus	Daggernose shark	decreasing	Critically endangered			
Mackerel shark		Isurus oxyrinchus	Shortfin mako	decreasing	Endangered			
Mackerel shark		Isurus paucus	Longfin mako	decreasing	Endangered			
Groundshark		Lamiopsis temminckii	Broadfin shark	decreasing	Endangered			II
Mackerel shark		Lamna nasus	Porbeagle	decreasing	Vulnerable			III (II eff. Sept. 2014)
Groundshark		Mustelus fasciatus	Striped smooth-hound	decreasing	Critically endangered			
Groundshark		Mustelus mustelus	Common smoothhound	decreasing	Vulnerable			
Groundshark		Mustelus schmitti	Narrownose smoothhound	decreasing	Endangered			
Groundshark		Mustelus whitneyi	Humpback smoothhound	decreasing	Vulnerable			
Groundshark		Nasolamia velox	whitenose shark	decreasing	Endangered			
Carpet shark		Nebrius ferrugineus	Tawny nurse shark	decreasing	Vulnerable			
Groundshark		Negaprion acutidens	Sharptooth lemon shark	decreasing	Vulnerable			II
Mackerel shark		Odontaspis ferox	Small-tooth sand tiger shark	decreasing	Vulnerable			
Dogfish		Oxynotus centrina	Angular rough shark	unknown	Vulnerable			
Carpet shark		Pseudoginglymostoma brevicaudatum	Shorttail nurse shark	unknown	Vulnerable			
Carpet shark		Rhincodon typus	Whale shark	decreasing	Endangered			II
Groundshark		Schroederichthys saurisqualus	Lizard catshark	unknown	Vulnerable			
Groundshark		Scylliogaleus quecketti	Flapnose houndshark	unknown	Vulnerable			
Groundshark		Sphyrna lewini	Scalloped hammerhead	decreasing	Critically endangered			II (eff. Sept. 2014)
Groundshark		Sphyrna mokarran	Great hammerhead	decreasing	Critically Endangered			II (eff. Sept. 2014)
Groundshark		Sphyrna tiburo	Bonnethead shark	decreasing	Endangered			II
Groundshark		Sphyrna tudes	Smalleye hammerhead	decreasing	Vulnerable			II
Groundshark		Sphyrna zygaena	Smooth hammerhead	decreasing	Vulnerable			II (eff. Sept. 2014)
Dogfish		Squalus acanthias	Piked dogfish	decreasing	Vulnerable			
Dogfish		Squalus montalbani	Philippines spurdog	decreasing	Vulnerable			
Angel shark		Squatina aculeata	Sawback angelshark	decreasing	Critically endangered			
Angel shark		Squatina albipunctata	Eastern angel shark	decreasing	Vulnerable			
Angel shark		Squatina argentina	Argentine angel shark	decreasing	Endangered			
Angel shark		Squatina formosa	Taiwan angelshark	unknown	Endangered			
Angel shark		Squatina occulta	Hidden angelshark	decreasing	Critically Endangered			
Angel shark		Squatina japonica	Japanese angelshark	unknown	Vulnerable			
Angel shark		Squatina nebulosa	Clouded angelshark	unknown	Vulnerable			
Angel shark		Squatina oculata	Smoothback angel shark	decreasing	Critically endangered			
Angel shark		Squatina guggenheim	Angular angelshark	decreasing	Endangered			
Angel shark		Squatina squatina	Angel shark	decreasing	Critically endangered			
Angel shark		Squatina tergocellatoides	Ocellated angelshark	unknown	Vulnerable			
Carpet shark		Stegostoma fasciatum	Zebra shark	decreasing	Vulnerable			
Groundshark		Triakis acutipinna	Sharpfin houndshark	decreasing	Endangered			
Groundshark		Triakis maculata	Spotted houndshark	decreasing	Vulnerable			

== See also ==
- List of threatened rays
