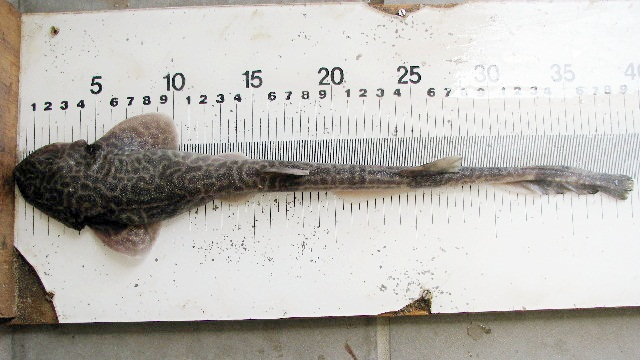

Conservation status
- Least Concern (IUCN 3.1)

Scientific classification
- Kingdom: Animalia
- Phylum: Chordata
- Class: Chondrichthyes
- Subclass: Elasmobranchii
- Division: Selachii
- Order: Carcharhiniformes
- Family: Pentanchidae
- Genus: Holohalaelurus
- Species: H. regani

Binomial name
- Holohalaelurus regani (Gilchrist, 1922)
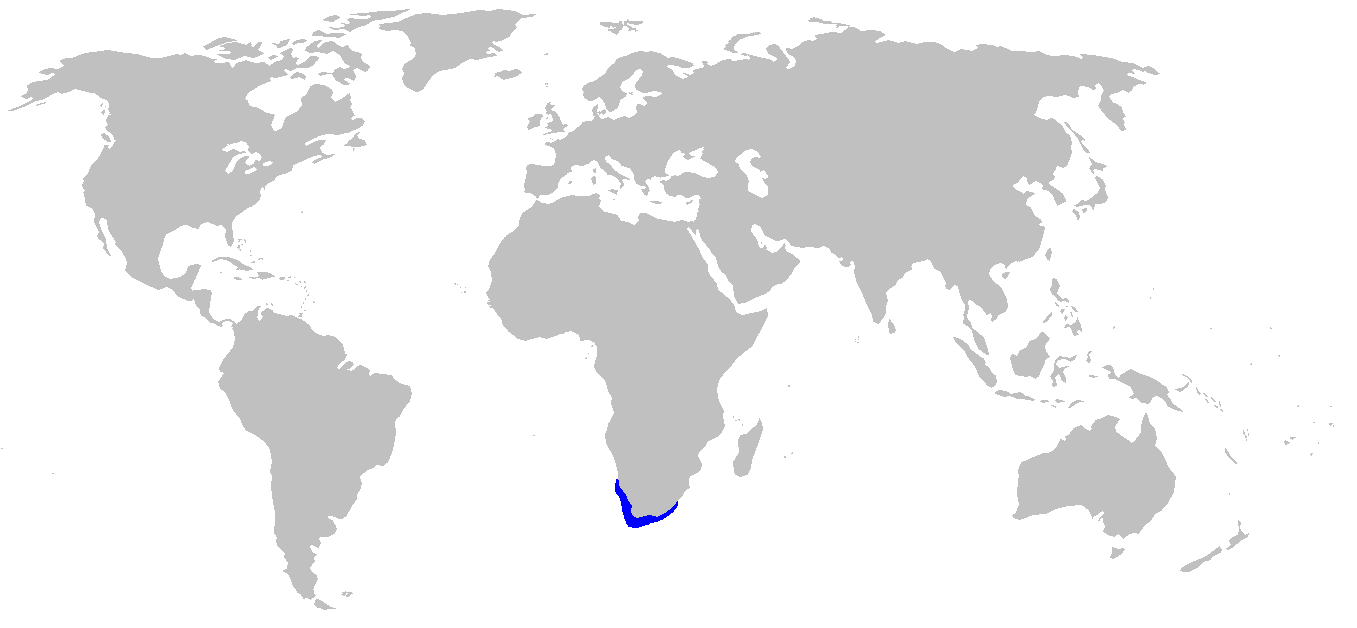
- Range of the Izak catshark

Synonyms
- Scylliorhinus regani Gilchrist, 1922

= Izak catshark =

Species of catshark, of the family Scyliorhinidae

The Izak catshark or simply Izak (Holohalaelurus regani) is a species of shark belonging to the family Pentanchidae, the deepwater catsharks. This species is common off the coasts of South Africa and southern Namibia. It typically inhabits the outer continental shelf at depths of 100–300 m (330–980 ft), with the males found deeper than the females and juveniles. The Izak catshark has a short, wide, flattened head and a robust body tapering to a long, slender tail. It can be identified by its ornate color pattern of dark brown spots (in juveniles) or reticulations and blotches (in adults) on a light yellowish background, as well as by the enlarged dermal denticles over its pectoral fins and along its dorsal midline from the snout to the second dorsal fin. This species reaches 69 cm (27 in) in length, with the males larger than females.

Bottom-dwelling and perhaps relatively active in nature, the Izak catshark feeds mainly on a diverse array of bony fishes, crustaceans, and cephalopods. A significant portion of its diet may be scavenged from offal discarded by fisheries. This species is oviparous, with females producing encapsulated eggs two at a time year-round. The Izak catshark is regularly caught incidentally by South African bottom trawl commercial fisheries, but is discarded rather than used. Despite the fishing pressure, its population has been increasing and thus the International Union for Conservation of Nature (IUCN) has assessed it as Least Concern.

== Taxonomy ==
The Izak catshark was originally described by South African ichthyologist John Gilchrist in a 1922 fisheries survey report. He assigned the new species to the genus Scylliorhinus, and gave it the specific epithet regani in honor of fellow ichthyologist Charles Tate Regan. In 1934, Henry Weed Fowler assigned this species to his newly created Holohalaelurus, a subgenus of Halaelurus. Holohalaelurus has since been elevated to the rank of full genus. As there do not appear to be any existing type specimens referable to Gilchrist's account, in 2006 Brett Human designated a 63 cm (25 in) long male caught in Hondeklip Bay as the species neotype.

Historically, there has been much confusion in the scientific literature between H. regani, H. punctatus, and H. melanostigma, the last of which at various times had been considered a junior synonym of H. regani and was itself confounded with H. grennian. Furthermore, two forms of H. regani were once recognized: the "Cape" or "typical" form and the "Natal" or "northeastern" form. The latter "northeastern" form was described as a separate species, H. favus, in 2006.

== Description ==
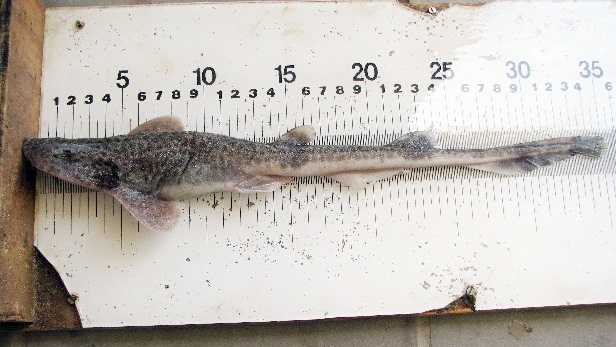
The Izak catshark has a very long caudal peduncle and distinctively ornate dorsal markings.

The body of the Izak catshark is firm and stout, tapering dramatically towards the tail. The head is very short, wide, and flattened, with a blunt snout. The horizontally oval eyes are placed high on the head and have thick ridges beneath; each has a rudimentary nictitating membrane and is followed by a spiracle. The nostrils are preceded by triangular flaps of skin that almost reach the long, angular mouth. The mouth contains prominent papillae on both the roof and the floor, and lacks furrows at the corners. The upper and lower jaws contain on average 65 and 60 tooth rows respectively; each tooth is relatively large, with a narrow central cusp flanked by 1–2 smaller cusplets. There are five pairs of gill slits.

The pectoral fins are rather long and broad. The first dorsal fin originates over the rear of the pelvic fin bases; the second dorsal fin is slightly larger and originates over the rear of the anal fin base. The pelvic and anal fins are long and low, and larger than the dorsal fins. The free rear tips of the pelvic fins may be fused together to some degree, but never completely; males have slender, pointed claspers. The caudal peduncle is long and thin, particularly in younger sharks. The caudal fin makes up one-fourth to one-fifth of the total length and has a weak lower lobe and a ventral notch near the tip of the upper lobe. The thick skin is covered by well-calcified dermal denticles, except around the gill slits. Enlarged, spike-like denticles are found on the upper surface of the pectoral fins and along the dorsal midline from the snout to the second dorsal fin origin. Juvenile Izak catsharks are boldly patterned with many irregularly shaped dark brown spots on a light yellow to yellowish brown background. The spots enlarge and fuse with age to form an intricate pattern of reticulations and U-shaped markings in adults. The underside is plain white, with obvious black sensory pores beneath the head, body, and paired fins. Like other Holohalaelurus species, but contrary to the pattern in most cartilaginous fishes, males attain a much greater maximum length than females: 69 cm (27 in) versus 52 cm (20 in).

== Distribution and habitat ==
Endemic to the southern tip of Africa, the range of the Izak catshark extends from Lüderitz, Namibia, in the west to Durban, South Africa in the east. Older records further north along the East African coast (e.g. Somalia) most likely refer to other Holohalaelurus species. This abundant, bottom-dwelling species inhabits the outer continental shelf and upper continental slope, from 40 m (130 ft) to at least 1,075 m (3,527 ft) deep. Off South Africa, it is most common in areas with a wider continental shelf, and at depths of 100–200 m (330–660 ft) off the south coast and 200–300 m (660–980 ft) off the west coast. Females and juveniles tend to be found in shallower water than males. For the most part, the number of sharks in a given area remains largely constant throughout the year. However, sharks at the southernmost point of the Agulhas Bank may perform a small autumn migration towards the shore.

== Biology and ecology ==
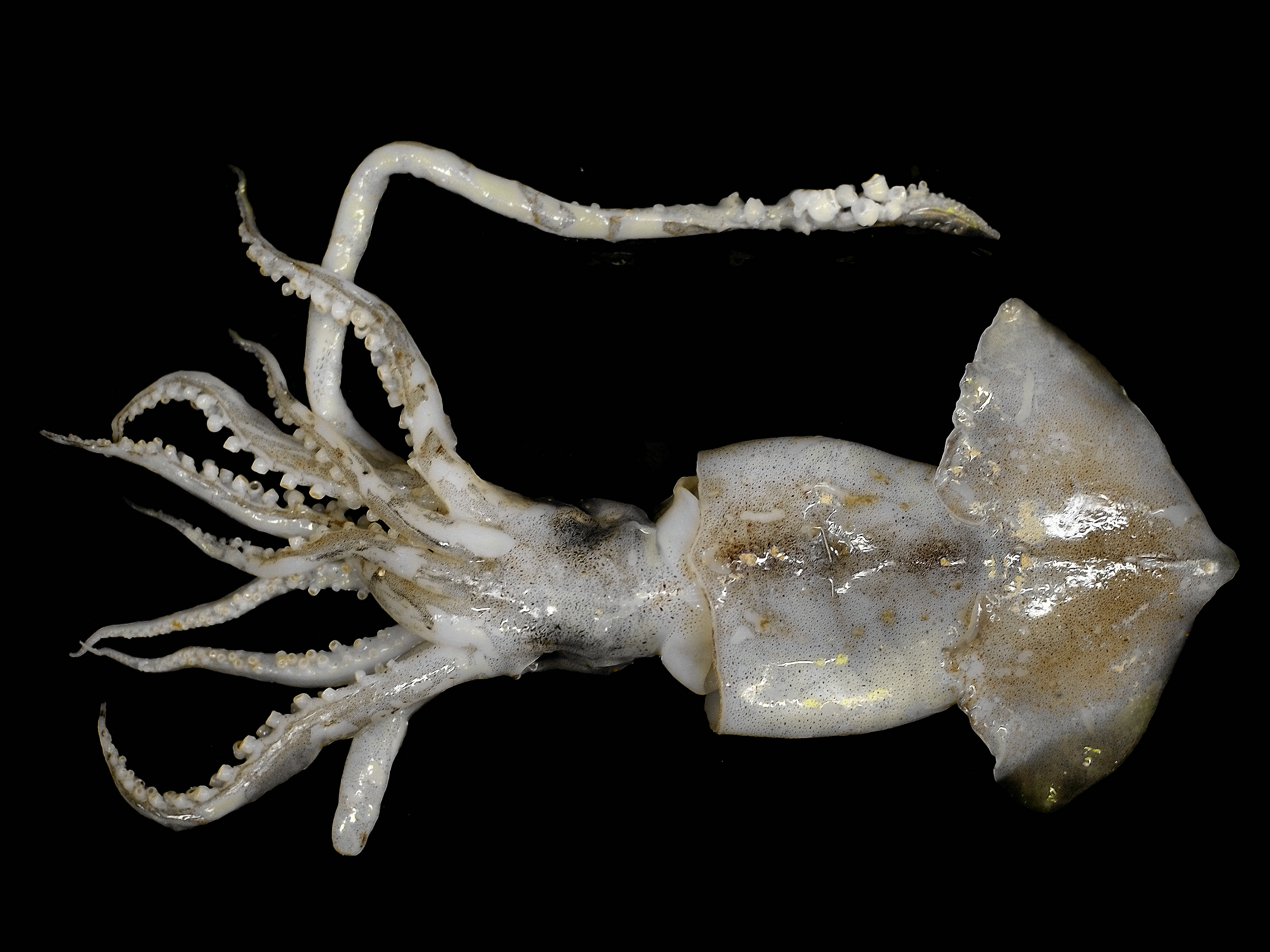
Squid such as Todaropsis eblanae are preyed upon by the Izak catshark.

Compared to other deep-sea sharks, the Izak catshark has a large heart suggestive of a relatively active lifestyle. It is a generalist that feeds on a wide variety of bony fishes, crustaceans, and cephalopods; larger sharks consume proportionately more crustaceans and fewer fishes. At least some part of its recorded diet probably represents scavenging from fishery discards, given the presence of fast-moving, pelagic species that the shark is unlikely to have captured live. Polychaete worms, hydrozoans, gastropods, and hagfish eggs may also be occasionally ingested. This species often has nematode and flatworm parasites in its stomach.

The Izak catshark is oviparous and reproduction proceeds throughout the year without seasonal patterns. Mature females have a single functional ovary and two functional oviducts; a single egg matures within each oviduct at a time. Each egg is contained within a purse-shaped capsule 3.6–4.3 cm (1.4–1.7 in) long and 1.2–1.5 cm (0.47–0.59 in) across. The capsule is light brown with long tendrils at the four corners that likely serve to anchor it to rocks; its surface has a velvet-like texture and bears lengthwise striations. The rate of egg laying is unknown but thought to be high, based on this shark's resilience to fishing pressure. The preponderance of females and juveniles at shallower depths may indicate that such waters serve as nursery areas. The young hatch at under 11 cm (4.3 in) long. Males and females mature sexually at 45–50 cm (18–20 in) and 40–45 cm (16–18 in) long respectively.

== Human interactions ==
The Izak catshark is harmless and of no commercial value. It is regularly caught incidentally (and discarded) by a bottom trawl fishery targeting hake south of Cape Town. In contrast to most cartilaginous fishes, its numbers have been increasing in the presence of commercial fishing. The reasons for this may include its high reproductive rate, its breeding in less-fished shallower waters, its hardiness allowing for high post-capture survival, and its opportunistic diet. The International Union for Conservation of Nature (IUCN) has consequently listed the Izak catshark under Least Concern, while still noting that it merits continued population monitoring because of its highly restricted range.
