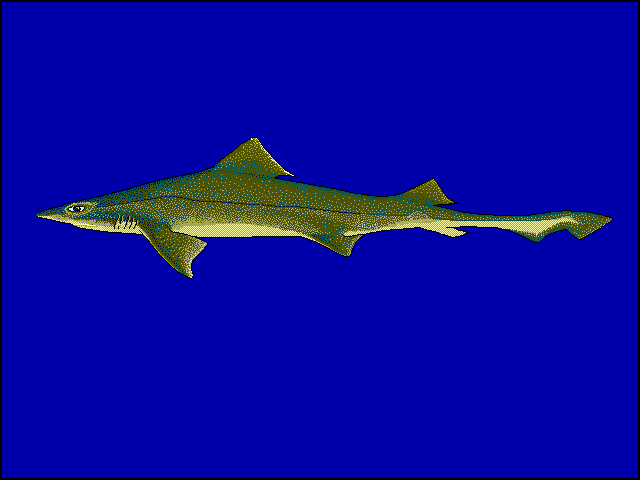

Conservation status
- Critically Endangered (IUCN 3.1)

Scientific classification
- Kingdom: Animalia
- Phylum: Chordata
- Class: Chondrichthyes
- Subclass: Elasmobranchii
- Division: Selachii
- Order: Carcharhiniformes
- Family: Triakidae
- Genus: Mustelus
- Species: M. mento

Binomial name
- Mustelus mento Cope, 1877
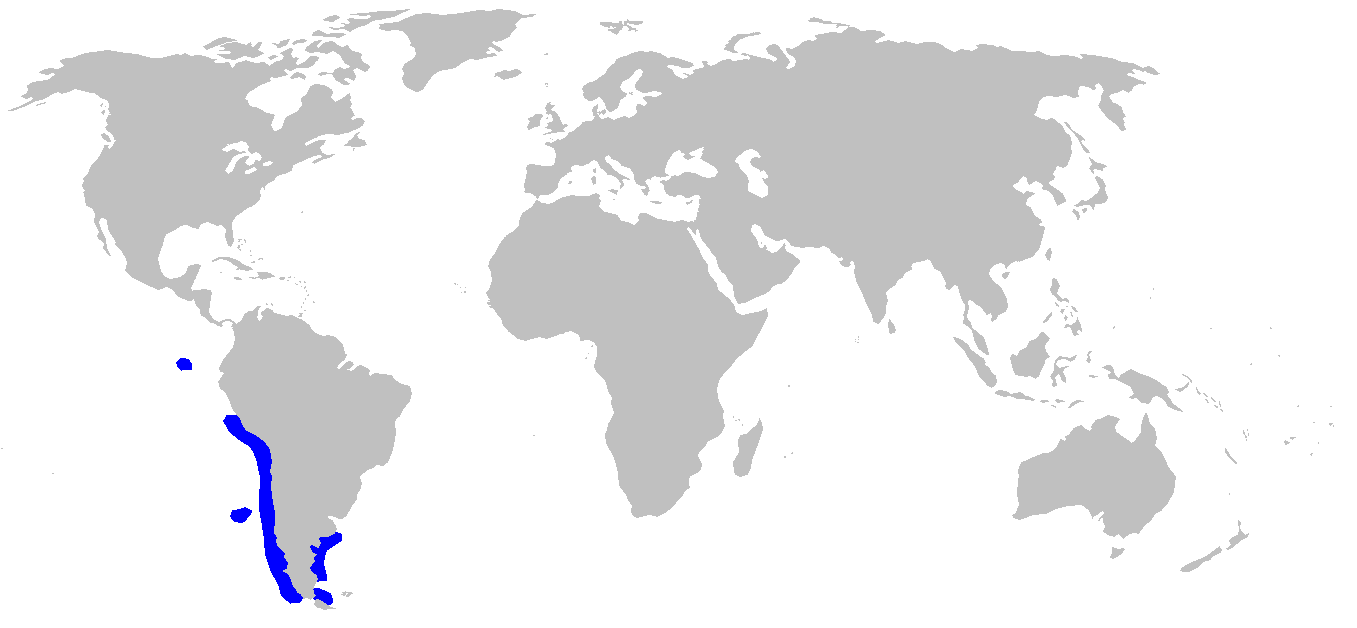

= Speckled smooth-hound =

Species of shark

The speckled smooth-hound (Mustelus mento) is a houndshark of the family Triakidae. It is found on the continental shelf of the eastern Pacific, between latitudes 0° and 54° S, at depths between 16 and 50 m (52 and 164 ft). It can reach a length of 130 cm (51 in). Collectively with certain other species of shark, it is known as "tollo".

== Description ==
The speckled smooth-hound is a robust shark with a moderately long, blunt snout, small eyes, short mouth and molar-like teeth without cusps. The trailing edge of the dorsal fins have small, pointed projections. The pectoral fins are large and the pelvic fins moderately large. The caudal peduncle is short and the lower lobe of the tail fin is narrow and slightly curved. The maximum length is about 130 cm (51 in) with maturity being reached by males at about 70 cm (28 in) and females at about 88 cm (35 in). Adults are grey or greyish-brown above and paler below, liberally speckled with white spots. Juveniles have dark bars.

== Distribution ==
The speckled smooth-hound is found off the Pacific coast of South America, including the Galapagos Islands and the Juan Fernández Islands. Its range extends from the Isla Lobos de Tierra in Peru to the southern tip of Chile. It is a demersal fish and swims close to the seabed on the continental shelf at depths of between 16 and 50 m (52 and 164 ft). Reports of this fish occurring in the Atlantic Ocean off the coast of Argentina are thought to be erroneous, and are likely to refer to the narrownose smooth-hound (Mustelus schmitti), another shark that is speckled with white spots.

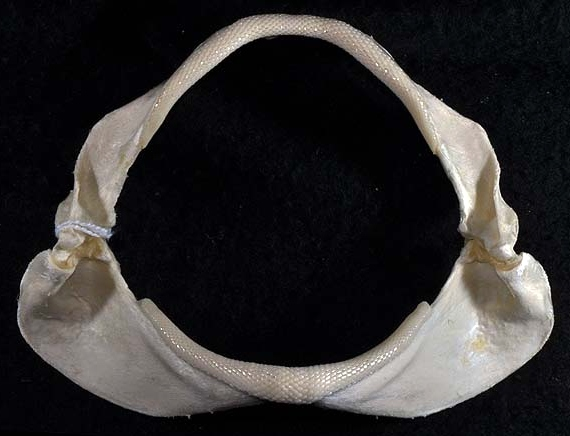
Jaws

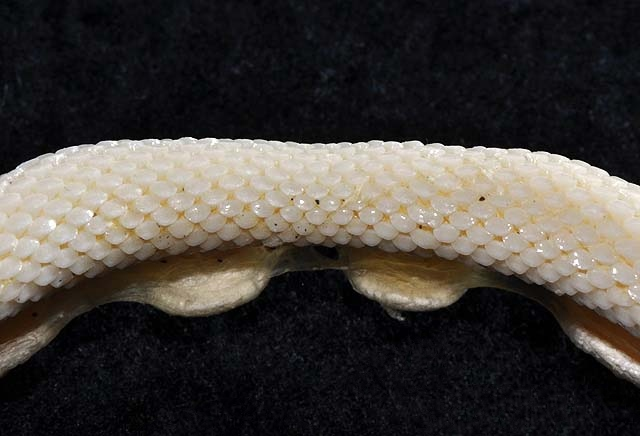
Upper teeth

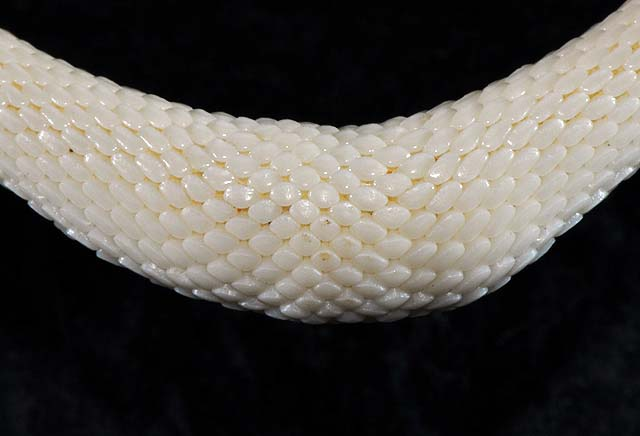
Lower teeth

== Biology ==
The speckled smooth-hound is ovoviviparous with eggs that develop within the female and hatch into juvenile fish which are about 30 cm (12 in) at birth. Litter sizes are typically seven.

== Status ==
Along with the humpback smooth-hound (Mustelus whitneyi) and the spotted houndshark (Triakis maculata), this fish is known to local fisheries as "tollo" and is caught by artisan fishermen using gill nets. Landings in Chile peaked in 1989 at around 1300 tons but have since dwindled to less than 200 tons a year, with fish stocks declining and a transfer of the fisheries to targeting rays. In 2001, the Peruvian authorities introduced a minimum size requirement of 60 cm (24 in) for tollo. The speckled smooth-hound is assessed by the IUCN as being "critically endangered".
