= Squalus philippinus =

Squalus philippinus is an invalid scientific name for two species:

- Port Jackson shark, Squalus philippinus Shaw, 1804 is a junior synonym to its accepted scientific name Heterodontus portusjacksoni
- Philippines spurdog, Squalus philippinus Smith and Radcliffe 1912 is a junior synonym to its accepted scientific name Squalus montalbani
