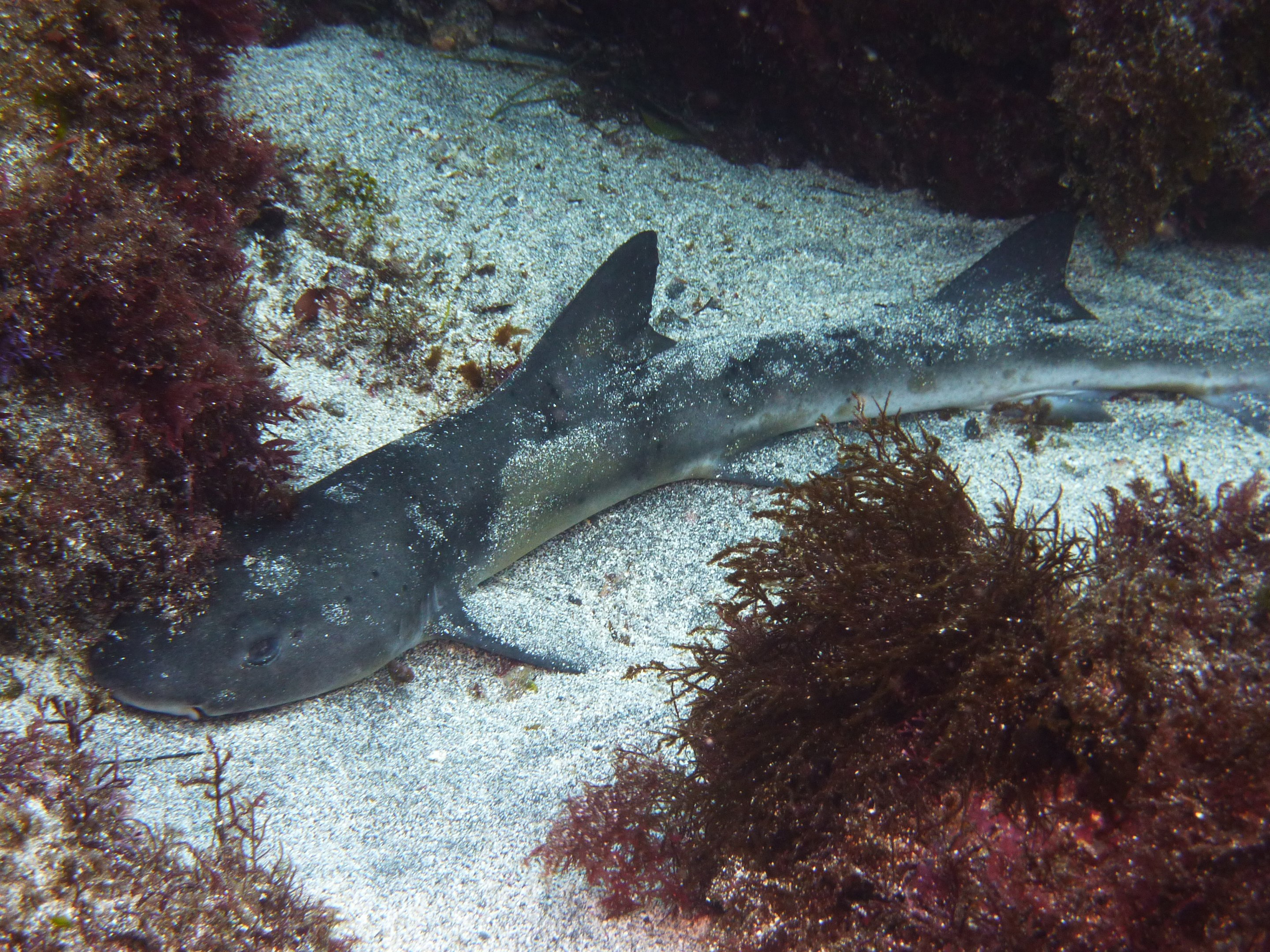

Conservation status
- Endangered (IUCN 3.1)

Scientific classification
- Kingdom: Animalia
- Phylum: Chordata
- Class: Chondrichthyes
- Subclass: Elasmobranchii
- Division: Selachii
- Order: Carcharhiniformes
- Family: Triakidae
- Genus: Hemitriakis
- Species: H. japanica

Binomial name
- Hemitriakis japanica (J. P. Müller & Henle, 1839)
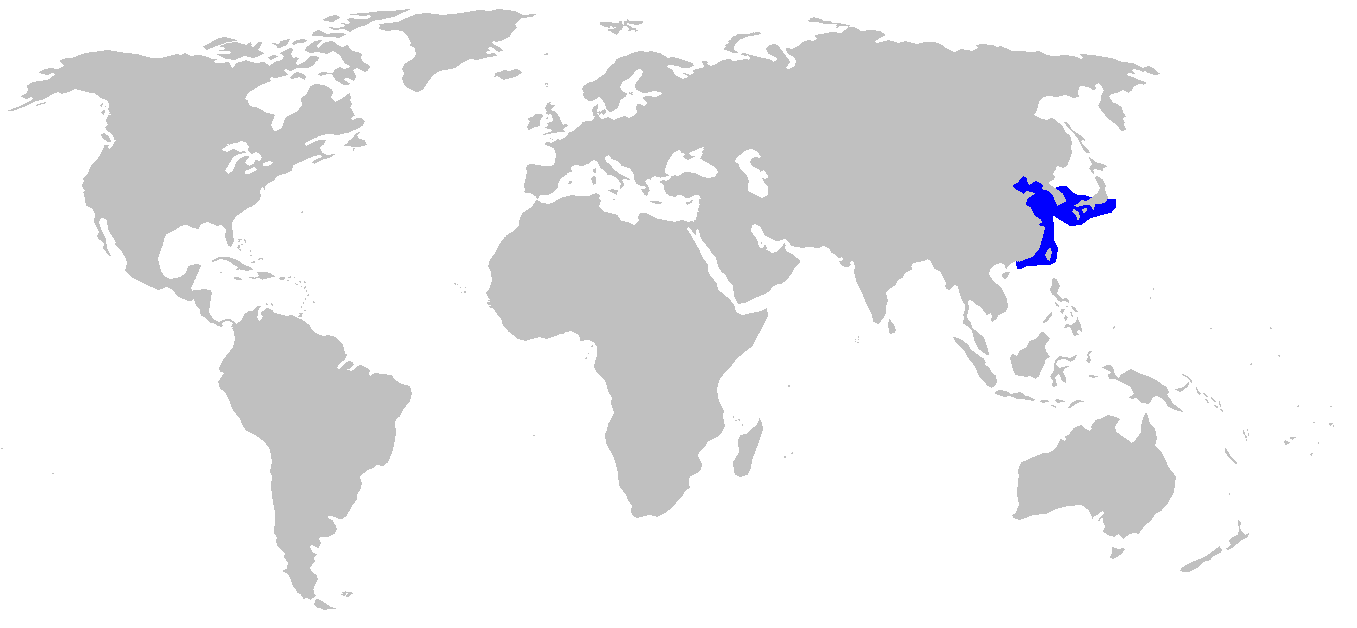
- Range of the Japanese topeshark

= Japanese topeshark =

Species of shark

Japanese topeshark (Hemitriakis japanica) is a species of houndshark in the family Triakidae, endemic to the north-west Pacific Ocean. It occurs from southern Japan to China, including the waters of the Republic of Korea, Democratic People's Republic of Korea, and Taiwan. The species is demersal on the continental shelf from inshore waters to a depth of about 100 m and is taken as bycatch in a variety of coastal and offshore fisheries. It has been assessed globally as Endangered under the IUCN Red List criteria A2d, based on suspected population reductions driven by intensive fishing pressure across its range and overharvesting for use in Chinese traditional medicine. Common names are Japanese topeshark, Requin-há Dochizame in French, Cazón Japonés in Spanish, and Eirakubuka in Japanese.

== Taxonomy and nomenclature ==
Hemitriakis japanica was described by Müller and Henle in 1839. It belongs to the kingdom Animalia, phylum Chordata, class Chondrichthyes, order Carcharhiniformes, and family Triakidae (houndsharks). The species has been referred to by several synonyms, including Galeorhinus japonicus (Müller & Henle, 1839), Galeus japanicus Müller & Henle, 1839, and Hemitriakis japonica (Müller & Henle, 1839).

== Distribution and habitat ==
The Japanese topeshark is endemic to the north-west Pacific Ocean. It is recorded from southern Japan, the Republic of Korea, the Democratic People's Republic of Korea, Taiwan, and China. Within this region it occurs as an extant resident species in marine neritic habitats of the Pacific Northwest. The species is demersal on the continental shelf from inshore areas to around 100 m depth. It may also occasionally occur deeper, with some specimens reported from 315–730 m. It inhabits subtidal sandy, sandy-mud, and muddy substrates, where it is considered a suitable and important resident species.

== Description and biology ==
The Japanese topeshark is a relatively small shark, reaching a maximum total length of about 120 cm. Males mature at approximately 85 cm total length and females at about 80 cm total length. Reproduction is viviparous, with litters of 8–22 pups (on average around 10) and an annual reproductive cycle. Size at birth is about 20 cm total length. Female age at maturity is estimated at 4–6 years, and maximum age exceeds 15 years, giving an estimated generation length of around 10 years. The species is not known to be congregatory, and there is an inferred continuing decline in the area, extent, and/or quality of its habitat across parts of its range.

== Fisheries ==
The Japanese topeshark is exposed to intense fishing pressure throughout its spatial and depth range. It was previously targeted and is now primarily taken as bycatch in both artisanal and industrial fisheries using demersal trawls, longlines, set nets, and gillnets. All incidental catch is retained for human consumption. Small mesh sizes are widely used in fisheries operating within its distribution, which increases capture of juveniles and smaller individuals. Across its range, the species is not consistently distinguished in catch and landings data from similar smoothhounds such as the starspotted smoothhound (Mustelus manazo) and the spotless smoothhound (Mustelus griseus), which complicates species-specific monitoring of catch and trade. In southern Japan, the Japanese topeshark has become a more common bycatch species following the near-disappearance of the more preferred starspotted smoothhound over the last two decades.

== Population ==
No species-specific long-term time series of abundance are available. Survey data indicate that, in the Nagasaki Prefecture (south-west Japan), the species has been caught only sporadically over the past two decades. In Suruga Bay (south-east Japan) it continues to be taken regularly in low numbers in set-net surveys at 50 m depth, with catches reported to have increased slightly between 1993 and 2007. Historically, the Japanese topeshark was considered abundant in Taiwan but is now rarely seen in fish markets. Similarly, it is rarely encountered in markets in South Korea. In China, sharks of comparable size are now very infrequently seen in fish markets, and the Japanese topeshark is thought to be very rare, if present at all.

Landings data for all shark species combined from the Taiwan Exclusive Economic Zone (EEZ) show a 52% decline in total shark landings over 63 years from 1953 to 2015, despite substantial increases in both industrial and artisanal fishing effort. Reconstructed catches of sharks, rays, and skates for the EEZs of Japan, China, and South Korea indicate long-term declines of 98%, 67%, and 97%, respectively, over multi-decadal periods. When these reconstructed catch declines are scaled to three generation lengths (30 years) for the Japanese topeshark, they correspond to declines of approximately 30% (Taiwan), 88% (Japan), 40% (China), and 90% (South Korea). These values are not species-specific but are interpreted as indicative of broader shark declines across the region. Once common, the species is now considered rare in Taiwan, China, and South Korea, but it appears to be stable or slightly increasing over the past 15 years in at least one part of Japan where trawl fishing effort has declined over several decades. Overall, the population trend is considered decreasing, and the species is suspected to have undergone a population reduction of 50–79% over the past three generation lengths (30 years).

== Threats ==
The primary threat to the Japanese topeshark is intensive fishing pressure across its entire range. It is taken as bycatch in mixed-species fisheries using trawls, gillnets, and longlines, and all captured individuals are retained for human consumption. The use of small mesh sizes throughout much of its range increases mortality of juveniles and smaller individuals. High levels of fisheries resource exploitation, including "fishing down" of food webs, have been documented in several regional seas within its distribution, notably the East China Sea, Yellow Sea, South China Sea, and adjacent coastal waters. In the East China Sea, heavy exploitation, small mesh sizes, and intensive trawling have contributed to declines in fish stocks, reduced fish size, and lower trophic levels of catches. Over 30% of the catch in some areas consists of fish too small for direct human consumption but still retained for fish-meal production. In the Korean sector of the Yellow Sea there is intense trawl fishing pressure, and in the northern South China Sea fish stocks have declined by more than 70% across inshore, offshore, and outer shelf areas between the 1960s and 1990s. Since the 1990s in the South China Sea, more than 70% of the catch has consisted of low-value and juvenile fish.

In China, inshore coastal fishery resources have been depleted since the 1980s following decades of intensive bottom trawling and stake-net fisheries. Powered fishing vessels increased from around 10,000 in the late 1960s to about 200,000 in the mid-1990s; catch per unit effort has since declined, and larger, high-value species have been replaced by smaller, less valuable species, much of which is now used as aquaculture feed. Taiwan's coastal fisheries were considered overfished by the 1950s, and fishing effort expanded offshore within the EEZ and into distant waters. Powered vessel numbers in Taiwan's EEZ increased substantially from the 1950s to the late 1980s before declining somewhat; artisanal non-powered fleets have decreased markedly, while fishing rafts remain common. Demand for seafood remains high. In Japan, fisheries expanded rapidly between the 1950s and 1980s and then declined from the 1980s–1990s onwards due to shifts in fish prices and the establishment of a 200-nautical-mile EEZ. Fishing effort within the Japanese EEZ fell by about one-third between the 1950s and mid-1990s and has since remained relatively stable, with demersal trawl effort showing a marked long-term decline as fleets contract and age, and as management measures restrict effort.

Habitat loss and degradation further threaten the species. In the Yellow Sea and Bohai Sea, intensive coastal development and land reclamation have resulted in major intertidal habitat loss, including extensive loss of tidal flats. In the East and South China Seas, reclamation and coastal development have contributed to dramatic reductions in coastal and mangrove wetlands, with substantial loss and modification of mangroves, seagrass beds, and coral reefs. Major threat categories affecting the species include: Residential and commercial coastal development, including housing, urban, and industrial areas, which contribute to species disturbance and habitat decline. Biological resource use, particularly fishing and the harvesting of aquatic resources, where unintentional capture in both small-scale and large-scale fisheries causes widespread mortality and slow but significant population declines.

== Use ==
The Japanese topeshark is valued for its meat. In parts of southern Japan the meat is flash-boiled and sold as ubiki, with a mid-range market value, and may also be dried for human consumption in the Nagasaki Prefecture. The meat has similar value in markets in Korea and Taiwan and is sold for human consumption. In China, where sharks of this size are now rarely seen in markets, any individuals caught in multi-species fisheries are retained for their meat. The species was formerly used for fish paste or fish cake in the 1990s, but this use is no longer viable due to low catches. It is likely that the small fins also enter the shark fin trade. Use is primarily local and national, with no evidence of significant international trade in whole products, although the fin trade may involve international markets.

== Conservation and management ==
The Japanese topeshark has been assessed globally as Endangered under IUCN Red List criteria A2d (version 3.1), reflecting a suspected population reduction of 50–79% over the past three generation lengths (30 years) due to actual or inferred levels of exploitation. The most recent global assessment was completed on 29 August 2019 and published in 2021. A previous IUCN assessment in 2009 listed the species (as Hemitriakis japonica) as Least Concern. There are no species-specific management or recovery plans currently in place, and the species is not known to be the subject of targeted conservation actions such as harvest management plans, ex-situ conservation, or dedicated education and awareness programmes. It is not listed under international legislation or subject to specific international trade controls. The species does occur in at least one protected area and may benefit indirectly from broader spatial and gear-based management measures applied to coastal fisheries within its range.

In China, management measures introduced since the 1980s and 1990s to reduce inshore fishing effort include bans on motorized trawling in near-shore waters, seasonal closures, minimum mesh size regulations, vessel buyback schemes, and scrapping of fishing vessels. Since the late 1990s, seasonal closures on commercial bottom trawling have been implemented in the Yellow Sea, East China Sea, and South China Sea, with year-round trawl bans in the Bohai Sea. In 2018, seasonal closures were extended to most other commercial gears, with only rod-and-reel fishing remaining permitted for small-scale artisanal and recreational fishers, and enforcement has reportedly strengthened since 2017. Some parts of the species' range along the Chinese coast fall within protected areas. In Taiwan, the use of net fishing gears, including trawls and seine nets, is prohibited in designated reef areas. Since 1999, bottom trawling has been banned within 3 nautical miles of the coast and within 12 nautical miles for larger trawlers. From the mid-2000s, gillnets have been progressively banned within 3 nautical miles in parts of several counties, with a policy to remove gillnets from near-shore waters and support a transition to line and troll fisheries. Since 2005, sharks landed by vessels using ice must have their fins naturally attached. The species may also benefit from Taiwan's network of marine protected and restricted-use areas.

In Japan, measures to control fishing effort have been in place since the mid-1990s, including total allowable catches, seasonal closures, and gear restrictions, alongside strict spatial and temporal controls on trawl fisheries. Proposed conservation needs for the Japanese topeshark include species-level protection, spatial management (such as protected areas or closed seasons and zones), bycatch mitigation measures, and harvest and trade controls, potentially including international trade measures. Improved enforcement will require ongoing capacity-building, particularly in species identification. Enhanced monitoring of catches, population trends, and trade is considered necessary to inform management. Further research is also required on population size and trends, life history and ecology, and the development of a species action or recovery plan.
