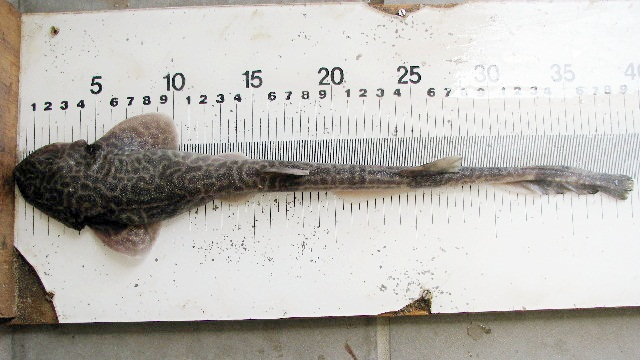
- Izak catshark (H. regani)

Scientific classification
- Kingdom: Animalia
- Phylum: Chordata
- Class: Chondrichthyes
- Subclass: Elasmobranchii
- Division: Selachii
- Order: Carcharhiniformes
- Family: Pentanchidae
- Genus: Holohalaelurus; Fowler, 1934

Type species
- Scylliorhinus regani Gilchrist, 1922

Species
- 5, See text

= Holohalaelurus =

Genus of sharks

Holohalaelurus is a genus of deepwater catshark belonging to the family Pentanchidae, commonly known as Izak catsharks or hallelujah sharks.

Member species of this genus are distributed in the western Indian Ocean off the coasts of various Southern African and East African countries, from Kenya to Namibia.

== Species ==
- Holohalaelurus favus Human, 2006 (Honeycomb Izak)
- Holohalaelurus grennian Human, 2006 (Grinning Izak)
- Holohalaelurus melanostigma (Norman, 1939) (Crying Izak)
- Holohalaelurus punctatus (Gilchrist, 1914) (White-spotted Izak)
- Holohalaelurus regani (Gilchrist, 1922) (Izak catshark)
