= Indonesian houndshark =

Conservation status
- Endangered (IUCN 3.1)

Scientific classification
- Kingdom: Animalia
- Phylum: Chordata
- Class: Chondrichthyes
- Subclass: Elasmobranchii
- Division: Selachii
- Order: Carcharhiniformes
- Family: Triakidae
- Genus: Hemitriakis
- Species: H. indroyonoi

Binomial name
- Hemitriakis indroyonoi W. T. White, Compagno & Dharmadi, 2009

Species of shark

The Indonesian houndshark (Hemitriakis indroyonoi) is a species of houndshark in the genus Hemitriakis. It is a part of the family Triakidae. The shark was named for Dr. Indroyono Soesilo, a researcher who supports the conservation of shark and ray fisheries in Indonesia. It was described by William T. White, Leonard J.V. Compagno, and Dharmadi in 2009.

This is an endangered small shark that lives in Indian Ocean waters, mainly endemic to Indonesia. Their survival is threatened by the local fishing practices, such as longline fishing, done by fisherman on the coastlines of Indonesia and the surrounding islands. They live at depths between 50-100 meters on the ocean floor making them vulnerable to overfishing done with trawling like techniques.

== Habitat ==
It is a tropical houndshark and it is endemic to the Southern Indian Ocean. They are specifically found near the islands of Java, Bali, Sumbawa, Sumba, and West Nusa Tenggara. The Java Trench that is situated between Java Island, Sumbawa Island and Sumba Island acts as a favorable habitat for the Indonesian hound shark population. The local names for sharks in the Triakidae family, such as the Indonesian Houndshark, consist of hiu kacangan in Bali, hiu meong in Lombok, Karil in West Java, and cucut londer in Java.

They live on the outer continental shelf and upper slopes which make them classified as demersal sharks. Demersal sharks, also called groundfish, are a type of shark that both inhabit and feed off of the sea floor. They are benthic dwelling sharks whose habitats consist of sandy, muddy, or rocky bottoms. Diets of these sharks usually include crabs, squids, and small fish. Though normal diets for these types of sharks are known, their exact species specific diet is still unknown. Because of Indonesian Houndsharks being demersal sharks, they are vulnerable to fisherman who fish with longlines and bottom gill nets in the Indian Ocean South of Java, Bali, and West Nusa Tenggara. Even though they are benthic seafloor dwellers, these fishing lines can reach depths deeper than 60 m where they can get caught up in the lines.

The Indonesian Houndshark use to only be found in the southern Indian Ocean in Indonesian waters, but recent studies show that they have been found in the waters surrounding India, mainly Andaman and Nicobar Archipelago. There is not a lot known about this species of shark due to them not being a targeted species. Targeted species are the focus of a hunting, fishing, or collecting exercise, or an extermination effort aimed at destroying a particular organism. Due to the life cycle of sharks in general, the houndshark is susceptible to overfishing pressure which pushes them closer towards extinction. Locally in the markets, the houndsharks are utilized normally only for their flesh and fins. They are too small to be sold to other fishing markets abroad. A study done in 2015 by Sembiring et al. found that only 0.69% of fins in the Indonesian fish market were able to be identified with barcoding came from the Indonesian Houndshark.

== Morphology ==
Two female Indonesian Houndsharks were caught in December of 2017 and February of 2018. These two female sharks were identified as Indonesian Houndsharks by their long and narrow snouts, rounded nasal flaps, and their arched mouths. They were caught using a longline fishing technique in Cambell Bay Nicobar. They measured to be between 100-105 cm in length and weighed around 4.35 kg. This was used in a study conducted by Tyabji et al to see what number of endangered sharks ended up in fish markets in Indonesia.

A recent study conducted by Agus Arifin Sentosa and Umi Chodrijah between the years of 2016-2019 in fisheries around Southern West Nusa Tenggara was done with 454 Indonesian houndsharks to measure their length-weight measurements. Before this study, there was virtually no information on these measurements. This study suggests that if these sharks are continuously caught their population will decline significantly because of their slow growth rate. Females give birth to live young, with no placenta or yolk sac, and can have between six and 11 pups in one litter. When born, the pups measure 28–30 cm long. At first maturity, the houndsharks measure 90 cm, and males can go on to reach a maximum length of 120 cm, while females can reach a maximum length of 115 cm. Their gestational period is unknown and it is assumed that they live roughly around 10 years. White et al. study found that male houndsharks matured at a length of 92-95 cm and females roughly around 100 cm.
