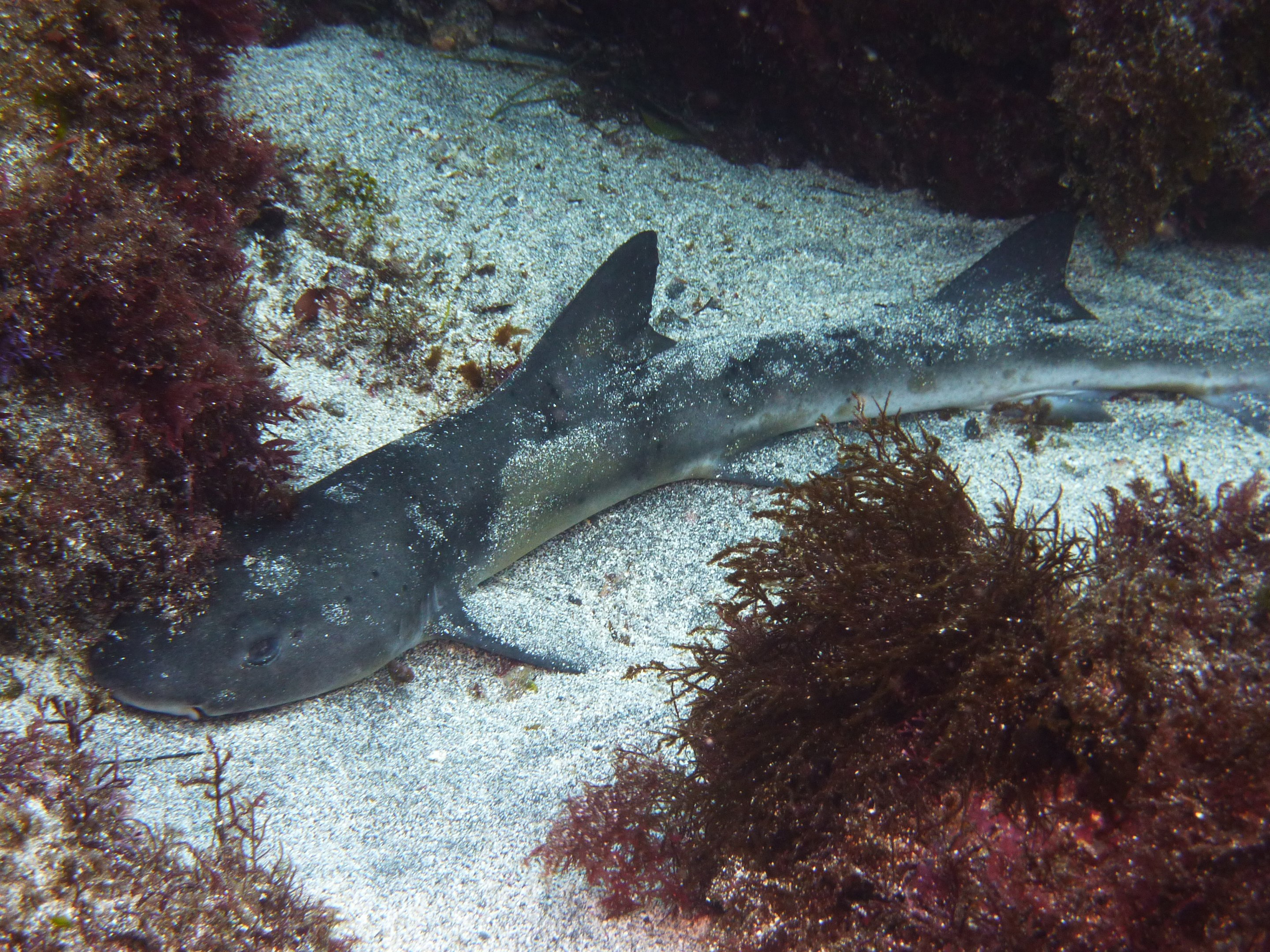
- Japanese topeshark (Hemitriakis japanica)

Scientific classification
- Kingdom: Animalia
- Phylum: Chordata
- Class: Chondrichthyes
- Subclass: Elasmobranchii
- Division: Selachii
- Order: Carcharhiniformes
- Family: Triakidae
- Subfamily: Galeorhininae
- Genus: Hemitriakis; Herre, 1923

Species
- See text

= Hemitriakis =

Genus of sharks

Hemitriakis is a genus of houndsharks in the family Triakidae.

== Species ==
- Hemitriakis abdita Compagno & Stevens, 1993 (deepwater sicklefin houndshark)
- Hemitriakis complicofasciata T. Takahashi & Nakaya, 2004 (ocellate topeshark)
- Hemitriakis falcata Compagno & Stevens, 1993 (sicklefin houndshark)
- Hemitriakis indroyonoi W. T. White, Compagno & Dharmadi, 2009 (Indonesian houndshark)
- Hemitriakis japanica (J. P. Müller & Henle, 1839) (Japanese topeshark)
- Hemitriakis leucoperiptera Herre, 1923 (whitefin topeshark)
