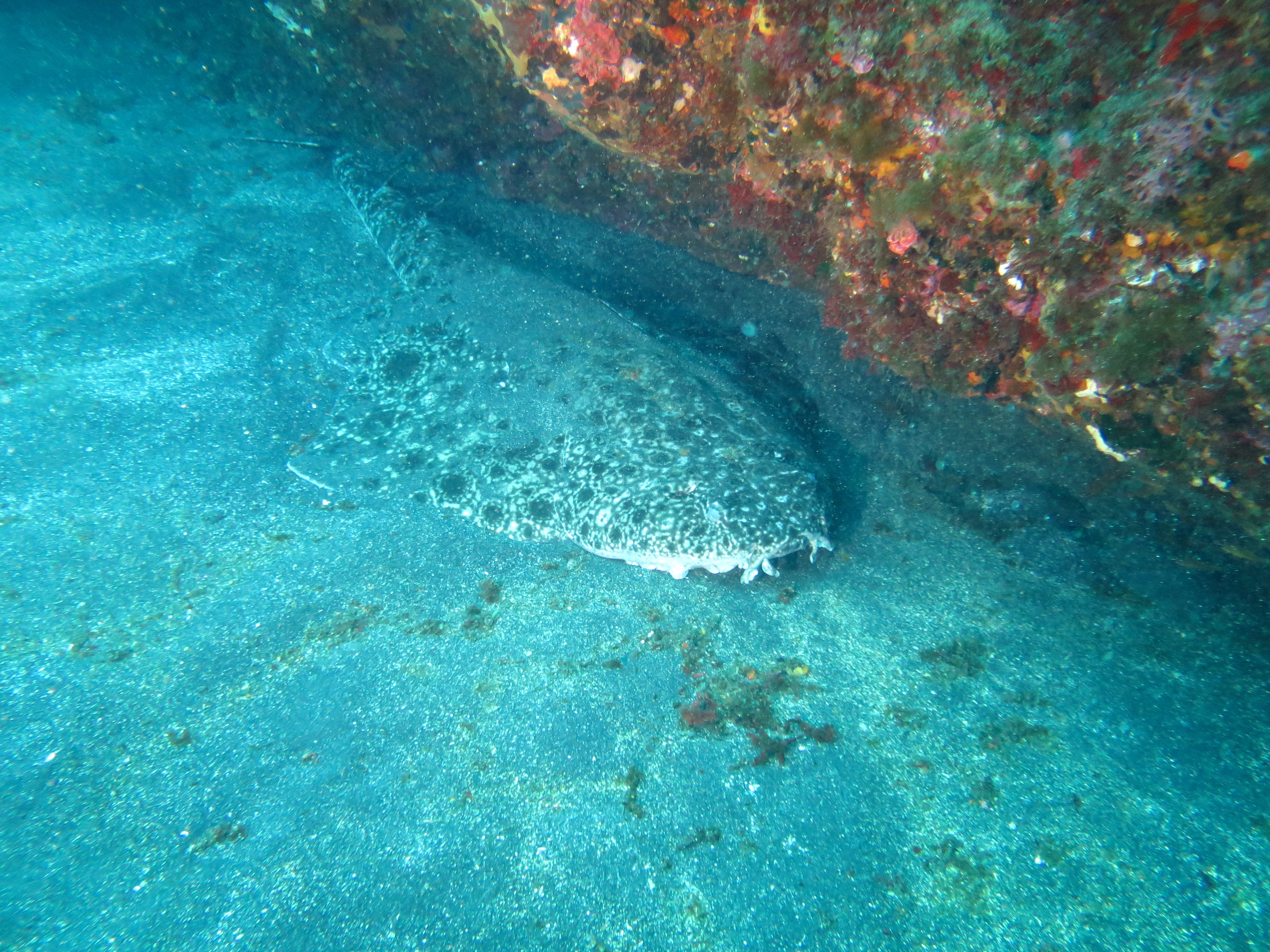

Conservation status
- Endangered (IUCN 3.1)

Scientific classification
- Kingdom: Animalia
- Phylum: Chordata
- Class: Chondrichthyes
- Subclass: Elasmobranchii
- Division: Selachii
- Order: Squatiniformes
- Family: Squatinidae
- Genus: Squatina
- Species: S. nebulosa

Binomial name
- Squatina nebulosa Regan, 1906
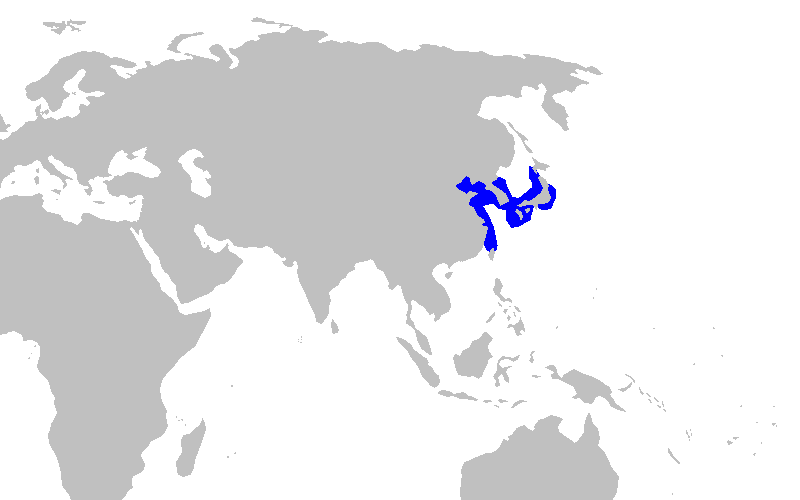
- Range of clouded angelshark (in blue)

= Clouded angelshark =

Species of shark

The clouded angelshark (Squatina nebulosa) is an angelshark of the family Squatinidae found in the northwest Pacific from the southeastern Sea of Japan to Taiwan between latitudes 47° N and 22° N. Its length is up to 1.63 m.

Reproduction is ovoviviparous.
