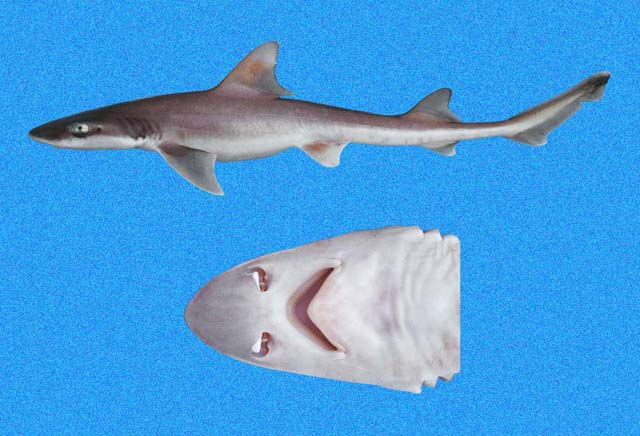

Conservation status
- Critically Endangered (IUCN 3.1)

Scientific classification
- Kingdom: Animalia
- Phylum: Chordata
- Class: Chondrichthyes
- Subclass: Elasmobranchii
- Division: Selachii
- Order: Carcharhiniformes
- Family: Triakidae
- Genus: Mustelus
- Species: M. whitneyi

Binomial name
- Mustelus whitneyi Chirichigno F., 1973
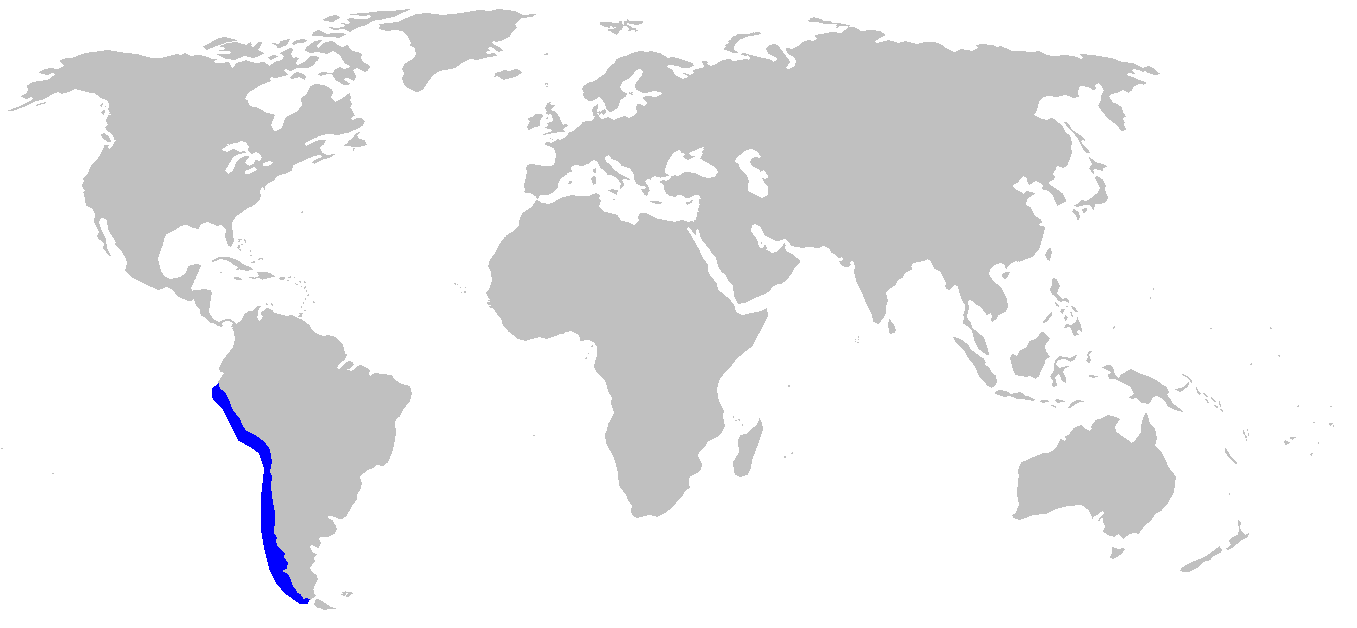

= Humpback smooth-hound =

Species of shark

The humpback smooth-hound (Mustelus whitneyi) is a species of houndshark and a part of the family Triakidae. The most noticeable difference between Mustelus whitneyi and its relatives, is the slight curvature, causing a "humpback" appearance located in front of its primary dorsal fin. It is found on the continental shelves of the tropical southeast Pacific, from Peru to southern Chile, between latitudes 3° S and 54° S. These sharks are demersal feeders but range from depths between 15 and 210 metres (50 and 690 ft). Humpback smooth-hound sharks are small sharks, reaching a maximum size of 118 cm (46 in) in total length. Mustelus whitneyi typically feed on teleosts and invertebrates in the benthic and pelagic ecosystems, most important prey being the peruvian anchovy. These humpback smooth-hound sharks are placental viviparious sharks, meaning that the embryo forms inside the mother tethered by the placental cord. The threats currently causing population decline to humpback smooth-hound sharks surround issues with local fisheries and management.

== Description ==
The humpback smooth-hound is a small shark growing to a length of up to 68 cm (27 in) in total length for males and 74–87 cm (29–34 in) for females, with a maximum size of 119 cm (47 in). It has a sturdy body with a moderately long, broad, sharply angled snout and large eyes, set widely apart. The mouth is fairly long and the upper lip furrows are longer than the lower ones. The teeth have a main pointed cusp and sometimes smaller subsidiary ones. The first dorsal fin is approximately triangular and the trailing edge is fringed with bare, dark-coloured collagen rods known as ceratotrichia. The pectoral fins are large and the pelvic fins moderately so. The caudal peduncle is short and the lower lobe of the tail fin is hardly curved in adults. The color of this shark is plain grey or greyish-brown without any spots or barring. The main difference between humpback smooth-hounds and others in its family, as mentioned before, is the slight curvature located directly behind the head, causing a "humpback" appearance.

The humpback smooth-hound is streamlined in many different aspects. First being that the humpback smooth-hound has a almost completely cylindrical body allowing the animal to dive through the water. The shape of the primary dorsal fin reduces friction drag in the water, allowing the animal to move without exerting as much energy. Finally, the upper caudal lobe is disproportionately larger than the lower caudal lobe. This allows the shark to quickly and easily change direction.

== Distribution and habitat ==
The humpback smooth-hound is found in the southeastern Pacific Ocean off the coast of Peru and Chile, between 1°N and 45°S. Although, the humpback smooth-hound is found within this range; it is rarely found in Chile, and mainly concentrated in Peru. Its depth range is between 16 and 211 m (50 and 690 ft) but it is most common between 70 and 100 m (230 and 330 ft). Mustelus whitneyi is classified as a shark living in the marine neritic habitat, meaning it can be found in coastal waters. The shark is both a demersal and pelagic feeder, often found in coastal waters at the continental base, near the seabed, or on rocky shores.

Due to their presence in both benthic and pelagic habitats humpback smooth-hounds play an important ecological role in transferring resources between the two. The sharks act as mobile links for nutrients and resources through the methods of predation and waste release.

== Biology and ecology ==
Humpback smooth-hound sharks are placental viviparous sharks, placental meaning that the sharks develop inside the body in a placental sac connected to the mother. The minimum gestation for these sharks was 7 months however gestation is likely to last 10–11 months. The female humpback smooth-hounds then have on average, 10 pups per litter measuring 22–23 cm (8.7–9.1 in) at birth.

Humpback smooth-hound sharks feed on a variety of organisms in both the benthic and pelagic coastal ecosystems. The main components of their diet include: bivalves, cephalopods, gastropods, and teleosts. They might also feed on crustaceans such as crabs and mantis shrimps. A very important prey species of the humpback smooth-hound is the Peruvian anchovy, a small pelagic schooling fish.

The humpback smooth-hound sharks are one of the top predators in their ecosystems therefore they have large ecological impacts. First being that these sharks regulate prey dynamics and populations through predation. Secondly, these sharks modify and influence prey behavior and physiology. Also, the decline in these predators can cause an increase in cephalopod and other prey species biomass. This increase can trigger cascading effects in the pelagic ecosystem. Humpback smooth-hound sharks specifically act as mobile links for resources between the benthic and pelagic environments they in habitat. By the methods of predation, excretion, and defecation the sharks transport nutrients and other resources between these two ecosystems.

Specifically in the benthic habitats Humpback smooth-hounds physically alter the habitat through their predation. Because they prey on mollusks or other infaunal organisms they physically and biologically alter the sediment of the habitat, which can facilitate the penetration of oxygen in sediments and affects the nitrogen cycle. Their method of predation also causes more prey and resources to be accessible for many other species.

== Status and threats ==
The humpback smooth-hound is fished for human consumption in Chile but more particularly in Peru, where it is more common. The Peruvian fisheries are the main threat to the population decline through directly removing these sharks and indirectly through bycatch. The unsustainable harvest causing population decline is shown in the Peruvian gillnet fisheries and the trawl fisheries in Ecuador which the Humpback is mainly caught as bycatch, and discarded. Along with the spotted houndshark (Triakis maculata) and the speckled smooth-hound (Mustelus mento), it is known as "tollo" in its local fisheries, and of the three species it is the humpback smooth-hound that is the main target of the tollo fishery in Peru, which masks the true catch of humpback smooth-hound causing more individuals to be unsustainably removed. Landings averaging 11,000 tons of tollo per year were made in that country between 1965 and 1989, but quantities caught diminished thereafter. A minimum size requirement of 60 cm (24 in) was set in 2001 but was pitched so low as to have limited conservation effect. This is because this requirement does not protect the mature individuals which reproductively contribute to the population size and growth. The humpback smooth-hound is the 4th most captured of all sharks and the most captured of all demersal organisms. The fishery overexploitation is the cause of >80% reduction in population size of humpback smooth-hound sharks. The International Union for Conservation of Nature (IUCN) has rated the status of the humpback smooth-hound as being critically endangered due to overexploitation.
