= Eastern angelshark =

Conservation status
- Vulnerable (IUCN 3.1)

Scientific classification
- Kingdom: Animalia
- Phylum: Chordata
- Class: Chondrichthyes
- Subclass: Elasmobranchii
- Division: Selachii
- Order: Squatiniformes
- Family: Squatinidae
- Genus: Squatina
- Species: S. albipunctata

Binomial name
- Squatina albipunctata Last & W. T. White, 2008
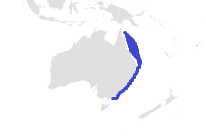
- Range of the Eastern angelshark

Species of shark

The eastern angelshark (Squatina albipunctata) is an angelshark of the family Squatinidae.

== Measurements ==
Born: 30 cm TL; Mature: ~ 91 cm (M), 107 cm (F) TL; Max: 110 cm (M), 130 cm (F) TL.

== Identification ==
Colour: Are a yellow-brown to a chocolate-brown, obtains dense patterns of small white dark edged symmetrical spots, also with many large brownish blotches. Has white nuchal spot (no ocelli). Also has light unspotted unpaired fins. Body: Has a very short snout. Has concave interorbital space and heavy orbital thorns which can be distinguished from Squatina australis. The nasal barbels have extended tips and lobate fringes. Has low lateral head folds. The spiracles are close to the eyes, and are wider than eye-length. Obtains strong orbital thorns, and no medial row of predorsal thorns are shown.

== Distribution and range ==
Pacific: eastern Australia. Found between Cairns, Queensland and Lakes Entrance, Victoria. 17°S - 38°S.

== Climate and habitat ==
Tropical; Outer continental shelf and upper slope, benthopelagic, marine. Usually found in sand, 37-4 15 m down, but occasionally up to 60 m.

== Behaviour ==
Unknown.

== Biology ==
Diet: Probably feeds on bony fishes, crustaceans, and cephalopods. Reproduction: Up to 20 pups per litter.

== Status ==
IUCN Red List: Vulnerable.

== Threat to humans ==
Harmless.

== Resilience and vulnerability ==
Medium, minimum population doubling time 1.4 - 4.4 years; moderate to high vulnerability.
