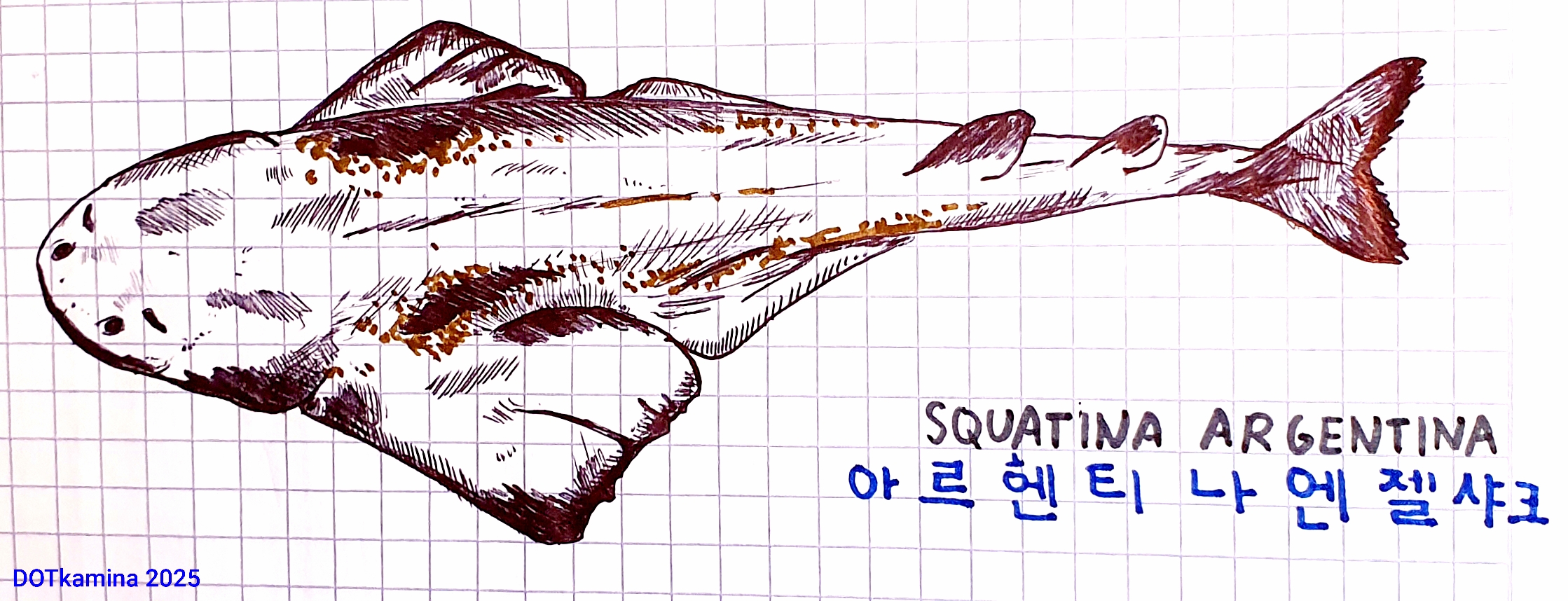

Conservation status
- Critically Endangered (IUCN 3.1)

Scientific classification
- Kingdom: Animalia
- Phylum: Chordata
- Class: Chondrichthyes
- Subclass: Elasmobranchii
- Division: Selachii
- Order: Squatiniformes
- Family: Squatinidae
- Genus: Squatina
- Species: S. argentina

Binomial name
- Squatina argentina (Marini, 1930)
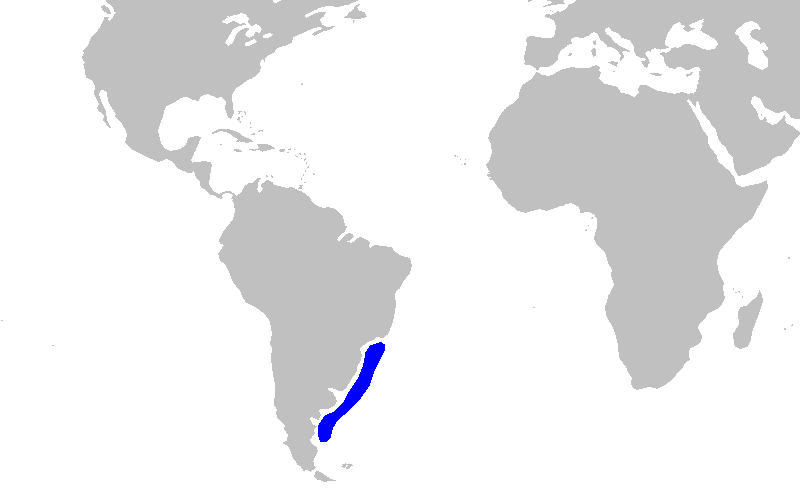
- Range of Argentine angelshark (in blue)

= Argentine angelshark =

Species of shark

The Argentine angelshark (Squatina argentina) is an angelshark of the family Squatinidae.

== Measurements ==
Born: N/A.; Mature: ~ 100.0 cm - 120 cm TL; Max: 138 (?170) cm TL.

== Identification ==
Colour: Are a purplish-brown color with many scattered dark brown spots (with no white), that are mostly in circular groups around a central spot. No ocelli. Obtains paler dorsal fins. Body: Has simple spatulate nasal barbels. Also slightly fringed or a smooth anterior nasal flaps with no triangular lobes on lateral head folds. Has concave between its eyes. Obtains enlarged thorns on snout, and not back. Its pectoral fins are large, broad, and obtusely angular. Convex leading edge forming a very distinct 'shoulder'.

== Distribution & range ==
Southwest Atlantic: from southern Brazil down south to Patagonia. 19°S - 53°S, 68°W - 38°W.

== Climate & habitat ==
Subtropical; continental shelf and upper slope, demersal, marine. Found 50 – 320 m (usually 100 – 400 m) down.

== Behaviour ==
Unknown.

== Biology ==
Diet: Feeds on demersal fishes, shrimp, and squid. Reproduction: Are ovoviviparous, birth about 7 to 11 pups per litter.

== Threat to humans ==
Traumatogenic.

== Resilience & vulnerability ==
Very low, minimum population doubling time more than 14 years; high to very high vulnerability.
