= Crying Izak =

Conservation status
- Least Concern (IUCN 3.1)

Scientific classification
- Kingdom: Animalia
- Phylum: Chordata
- Class: Chondrichthyes
- Subclass: Elasmobranchii
- Division: Selachii
- Order: Carcharhiniformes
- Family: Pentanchidae
- Genus: Holohalaelurus
- Species: H. melanostigma

Binomial name
- Holohalaelurus melanostigma Norman, 1939
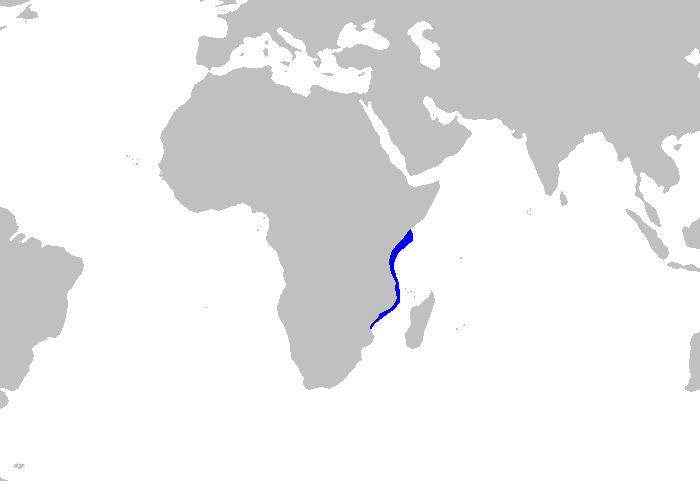
- Range of the crying izak

Species of shark

The crying Izak (Holohalaelurus melanostigma) is a species of shark belonging to the family Pentanchidae, the deepwater catsharks. It is found in the western Indian Ocean off Mozambique and Tanzania, at depths of between 600 and 660 m (1,970 and 2,170 ft). It can grow up to 38 cm (15 in) in length.
