= Ocellated angelshark =

Conservation status
- Endangered (IUCN 3.1)

Scientific classification
- Kingdom: Animalia
- Phylum: Chordata
- Class: Chondrichthyes
- Subclass: Elasmobranchii
- Division: Selachii
- Order: Squatiniformes
- Family: Squatinidae
- Genus: Squatina
- Species: S. tergocellatoides

Binomial name
- Squatina tergocellatoides J. S. T. F. Chen, 1963
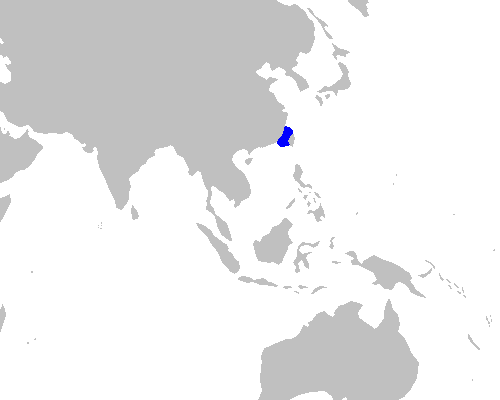
- Range of ocellated angelshark (in blue)

Species of shark

The ocellated angelshark (Squatina tergocellatoides) is an angelshark of the family Squatinidae found only from the Taiwan Straits in the western Pacific between latitudes 28 and 22°N and in northern Malaysia. Its length is up to 63 cm.

Reproduction is ovoviviparous.
