= Whitefin topeshark =

Conservation status
- Critically Endangered (IUCN 3.1)

Scientific classification
- Kingdom: Animalia
- Phylum: Chordata
- Class: Chondrichthyes
- Subclass: Elasmobranchii
- Division: Selachii
- Order: Carcharhiniformes
- Family: Triakidae
- Genus: Hemitriakis
- Species: H. leucoperiptera

Binomial name
- Hemitriakis leucoperiptera Herre, 1923
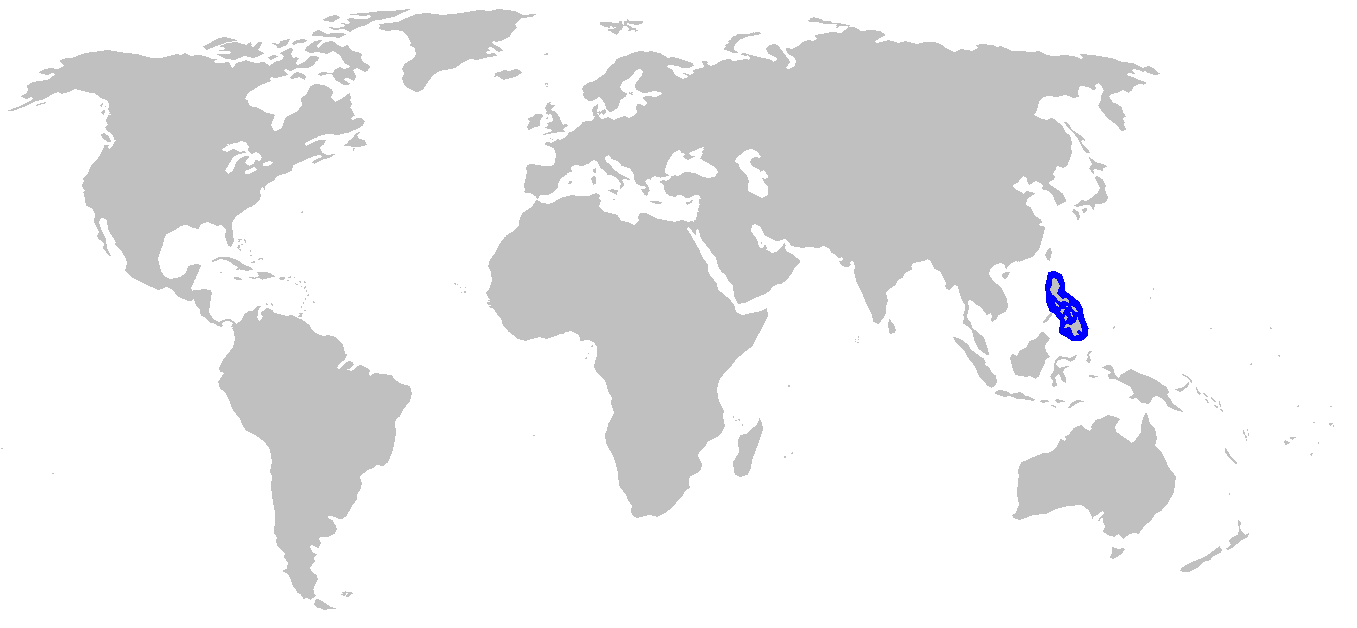

Species of shark

The whitefin topeshark (Hemitriakis leucoperiptera) is a houndshark of the family Triakidae, found only in the tropical waters of the Philippines between latitudes 20° N and 5° N. They inhabit the coastal areas. They can grow up to a length of 96 cm. Adolescent specimens have dark areas on their caudal fins. The reproduction of this shark is ovoviviparous.
