= Spotted houndshark =

Conservation status
- Critically Endangered (IUCN 3.1)

Scientific classification
- Kingdom: Animalia
- Phylum: Chordata
- Class: Chondrichthyes
- Subclass: Elasmobranchii
- Division: Selachii
- Order: Carcharhiniformes
- Family: Triakidae
- Genus: Triakis
- Species: T. maculata

Binomial name
- Triakis maculata Kner & Steindachner, 1867
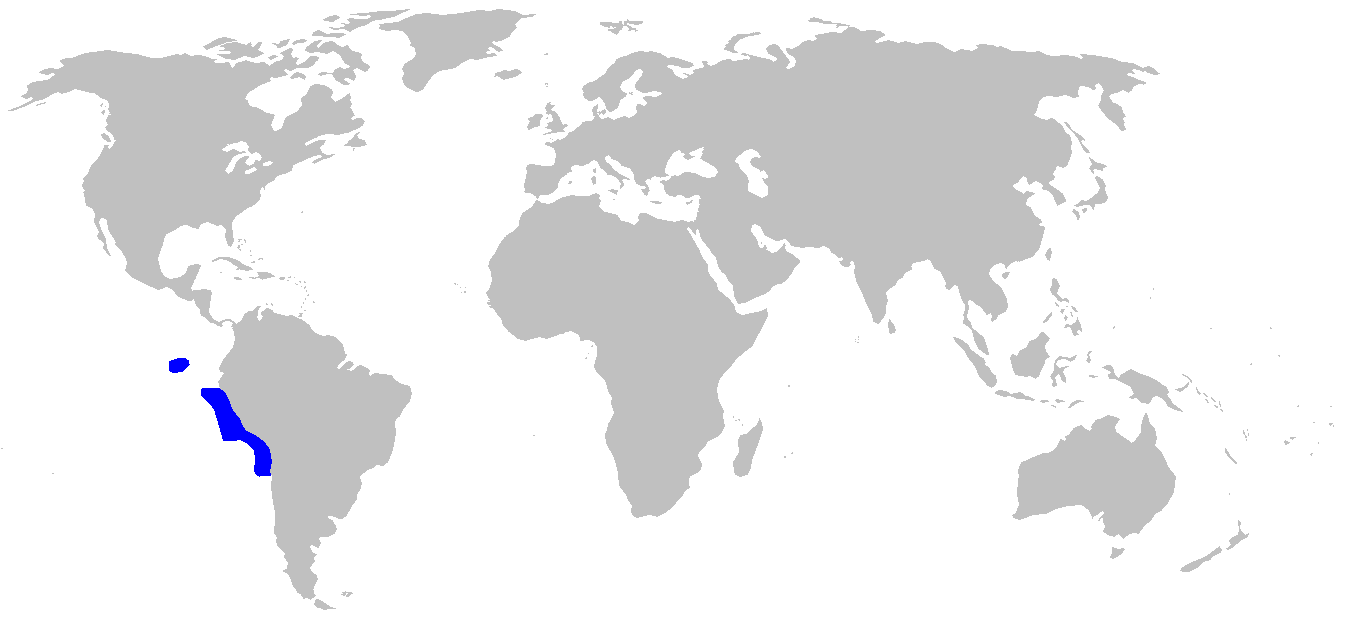

Species of shark

The spotted houndshark (Triakis maculata) is a houndshark of the family Triakidae found in tropical waters in the eastern Pacific Ocean off the coast of South America. It usually grows to a length around 180 centimetres (71 in). The reproduction of this houndshark is ovoviviparous, with a litter of 14 pups being found in one female with a birth size of 30 to 40 centimetres (12 to 16 in). Their diet is believed to consist mainly of crustaceans.

== Description ==
The spotted houndshark grows to a length around 180 cm (71 in) or exceptionally 240 cm (94 in). It is a robust species with a rounded snout, widely separated, lobed nasal flaps, and long upper lip grooves that extend as far as the junction of the jawbones. The teeth have straight, erect cusps and are not blade-like. The first dorsal fin has a sloping posterior margin and the pectoral fins are broadly falcate (long and curved). Sometimes the body is uniform in colour but more often it is finely spotted with black.

== Distribution ==
The spotted houndshark is found on the continental shelves in the eastern Pacific, from the Galapagos Islands and Peru southwards to the north of Chile, between latitudes 0° and 30° S.

== Status ==
The spotted houndshark is caught for human consumption by gillnet, and sometimes by trawling, in artisan fisheries mainly in Peru, along with the humpback smooth-hound (Mustelus whitneyi) and the speckled smooth-hound (M. mento), collectively known (in Spanish) as "tollo" in local fisheries. Of these three fish species, the spotted houndshark is probably less common than the other two and its total numbers seem to be declining. Some control over fishing has been instituted by the introduction of a minimum size requirement, but this has been set rather low in relation to the size of the fish at sexual maturity. The IUCN has rated the conservation status of this fish as being "Critically Endangered". With the decline in the main species sought (M. whitneyi), fishing pressure has decreased and further monitoring is required to assess whether the population trend will be reversed.
