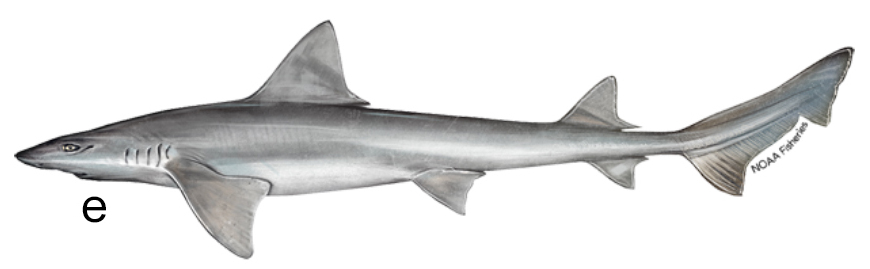

Conservation status
- Critically Endangered (IUCN 3.1)

Scientific classification
- Kingdom: Animalia
- Phylum: Chordata
- Class: Chondrichthyes
- Subclass: Elasmobranchii
- Division: Selachii
- Order: Carcharhiniformes
- Family: Triakidae
- Genus: Mustelus
- Species: M. schmitti

Binomial name
- Mustelus schmitti S. Springer, 1939
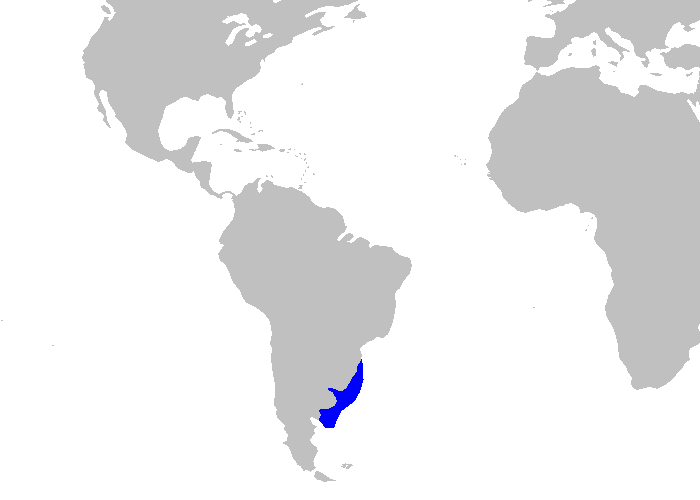

= Narrownose smooth-hound =

Species of shark

The narrownose smooth-hound (Mustelus schmitti) is a species of houndshark in the family Triakidae.

== Description ==
With similar morphology amongst 30 other species in the genus, it can be difficult to distinguish Mustelus schmitti from other Mustelus species. Mustelus canis is most mistaken with M. schmitti. However, M. schmitti can be identified through critical aspects of morphology. M. schmitti has gray coloration and spots on the top side of its body and a lighter gray coloration on the bottom side of its body. In addition to coloration, M. schmitti has two dorsal fins, the first dorsal fin (on the anterior side of the body) being more prominent than the second dorsal fin (on the posterior side), both of which have exposed ceratotrichia. The exposed ceratotrichia, which are filaments of collagen creating the fin shape, cause the appearance of a thin, dark band on the dorsal fins on their posterior margins. Alongside the dorsal fins, M. schmitti also has pectoral fins, pelvic fins, an anal fin, and a heterocercal caudal fin (the top caudal fin lobe is larger than the bottom lobe). All its fins are round and broad. The total length of M. schmitti can vary across their distribution. M. schmitti found in Argentina showed longer body lengths than individuals closer to Uruguay. Although M. schmitti can reach between 300 mm to 810 mm in coastal areas with the highest recorded total length documented as 1100 mm. Furthermore, M. schmitti has an inferior mouth with homodont dentition, which refers to the similarity in shape across all the teeth.

== Distribution ==
M. schmitti is endemic to the southwestern Atlantic Ocean coast. More specifically, M. schmitti is found on the continental shelves of the subtropical south-western Atlantic Ocean, from southern Brazil to northern Argentina, between latitudes 30° S and 44° S, at depths between 60 m to 195 m. M. schmitti has shown ontogenetic habitat preference with distributions differing between age classes of juveniles and neonates, and the adults.

For adults, the distributional changes occur due to a combination of sex segregation, migratory patterns, and the environment. During winter, both males and females will move to warmer water, traveling to southern Brazil. As spring and summer approach, however, adults will move towards the water near Uruguay. Additionally, females will reside in shallow water to engage in birth or intercourse. Larger-sized individuals, often associated with adults, reside in areas that have a higher concentration of salinity and lower depths.

Juvenile and neonate distribution is particularly dependent on environmental factors. Juvenile and neonate distribution does not show much change throughout the year. Typically, they remain near the shore and in warmer water. This is due to a higher abundance of resources, which aids in their growth and development into sexual maturity. Thus, as they reach maturity, they will distribute away from inshore, coastal areas.

=== Sexual segregation ===
As a shark, M. schmitti is classified as a Chondrichthyan, which are most often characterized by sex segregation. Sexual segregation refers to the concept where males and females live in different areas when it is nonreproductive season. Females reside at different depths and temperature of water than males during this period. The pattern of depth and temperature differs with populations living in different areas. M. schmitti females living near El Rincón tend to reside in higher depths and warner water than males during the nonreproductive season. Females in Río de la Plata live at lower depths and colder water during nonreproductive season.

== Biology ==
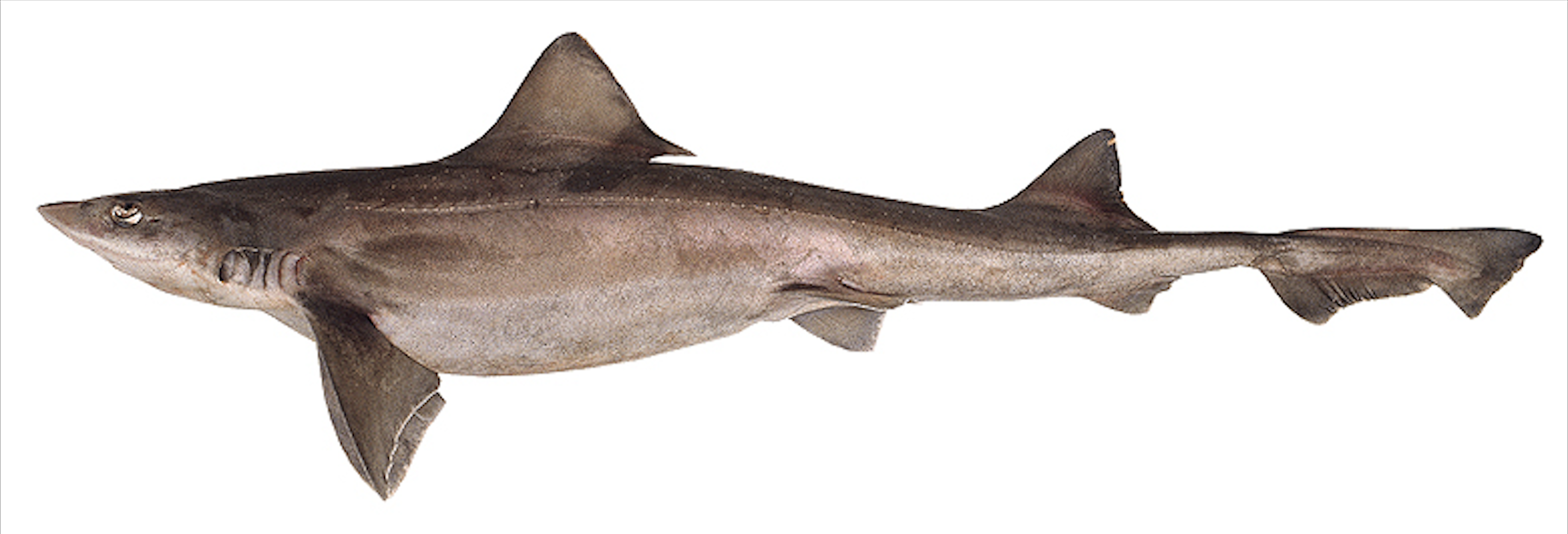
Mustelus schmitti Springer, 1939: In: Database of modern sharks, rays and chimaeras, www.shark-references.com, World Wide Web electronic publication, Version 11/2024

=== Age and growth ===
Similar to other species within the same class, M. schmitti tends to have a slow growth rate and long lifespan. The exact age of M. schmitti is difficult to determine, however, general estimations can be made, thus classifications will be made on a basis of juveniles and adults or immature and mature. Determining the growth of an individual often includes the use of the vertebrae. Studies count the number of bands on the vertebra, which will indicate the growth of the individual. This leads to M. schmitti being put in age classes, which are dependent on the total length. The jaw is also a part of this as typically the upper jaw contains more rows of teeth than the lower in adults. Juveniles, however, don't have much difference between the lower and upper jaws. Adults also tend to have longer teeth, causing a faster replacement rate of teeth. Juveniles, due to the shorter length of their teeth, have a slower replacement rate. To add on, it has been found that females show an average life span of up to 20 years old, whereas males averaged a lifespan of up to 12 years old.

=== Reproduction ===
M. schmitti has a late development in sexual maturation like other species within its class. The reproductive cycle is long, with females reproducing only once a year and a gestation period lasting between 10 and 11 months. They are considered ovoviviparous in which females maintain their eggs within their bodies until the embryos develop enough to hatch. This cycle includes migrating toward warmer areas where females can birth litters of one to ten offspring. However, there are occasions in which an observed female will have up to 19 embryos. With their slow reproductive cycle and the tendency to give birth to a small litter, M. schmitti consequently has a low rate of reproduction.

=== Feeding habits ===
M. schmitti is often described as an "opportunist feeder" due to their diets which include a wide range of prey but are dominated by crustaceans, fish, and polychaetes. Their diets shift as they develop from juveniles to adults but are also impacted by aspects such as geographical distribution and seasonality. In the coastal areas of Río de la Plata, there is a higher consumption of crustacean organisms. The individuals residing in the deeper water of Río de la Plata also feed on crustaceans but consume other organisms as well, primarily fish and polychaetes. In another coastal area located in El Rincón, M. schmitti displayed a preference for polychaetes, while those living in the deep water of El Rincón preferred fish. To add on, the size increase as they develop is also attributed to this shift in their diets. It has been found that diets in coastal areas tend to be abundant in Polychaetes when the sharks are small, typically classified as juveniles. At the same time, as seasons cause a lower temperature, the diets of juveniles become narrow. Prey selection in this area shifts to fish as the sharks' size increases and moves into deeper water, which is typical in adults. It is suggested that these shifts in diets as individuals age into new life stages are done in attempts to mitigate competition amongst individuals of the same species.

== Conservation status ==
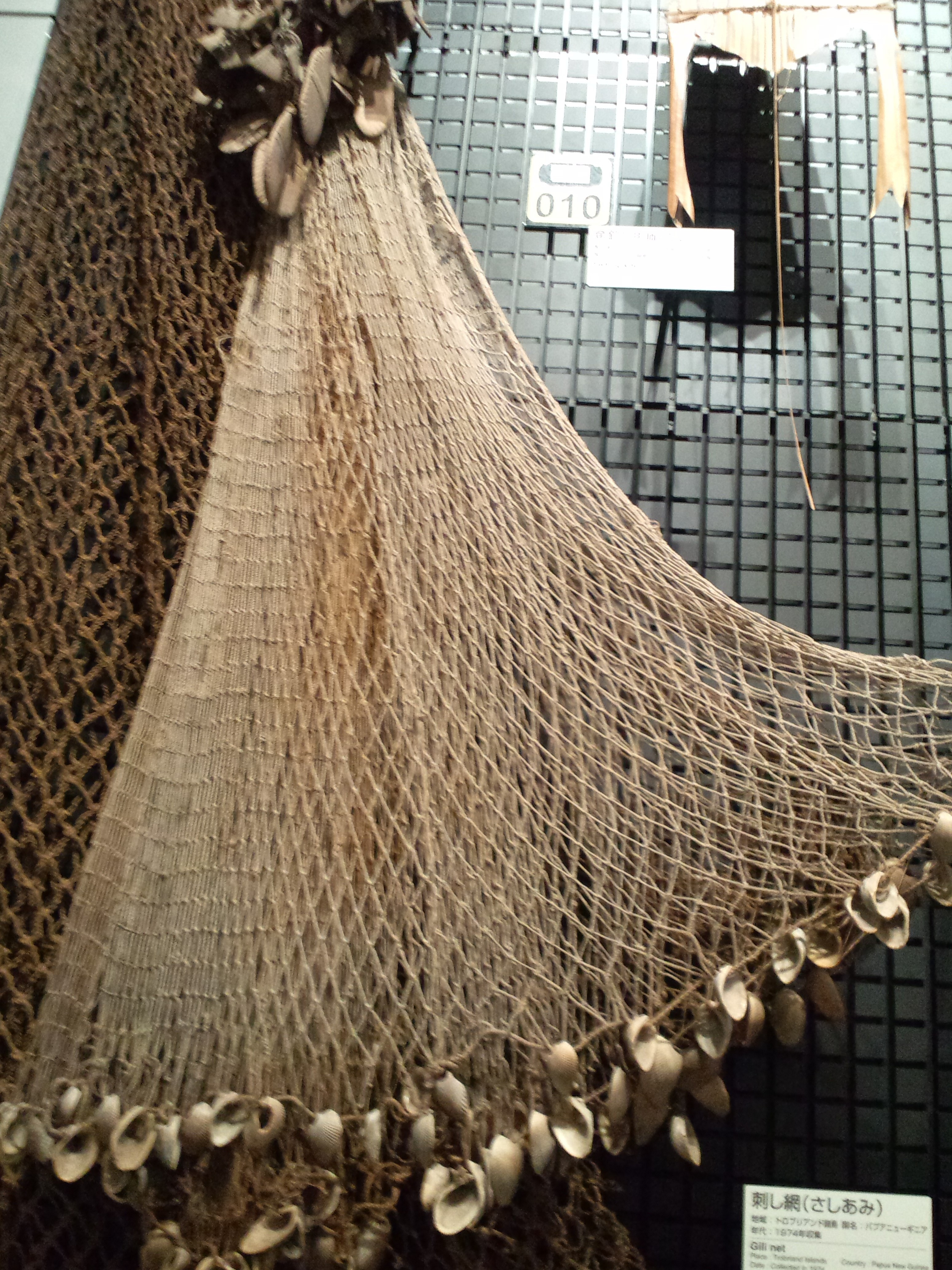
National Museum of Ethnology, Osaka - Gill net - Trobriand Islands in Papua New Guinea - Collected in 1974

M. schmitti is considered a critically endangered species. This is due to the issue of fishing, both as a victim of bycatch and intentionally through artisanal fishing. Alongside other sharks, M. schmitti is often fished for human consumption. M. schmitti is one of the most caught species in artisanal fishing in the Atlantic coast with small gillnets being the primary method used against them. However, when they are unintentionally caught as bycatch, the specific size of individuals caught is dependent on the size of the gillnets used, which differs across different areas. Fishers will target M. schmitti particularly during the months of April to October. To tackle this issue, specific sized gillnets are promoted to narrow down the portion of the M. schmitti population being caught. Given the migration pattern, reproductive rate, and growth rate, M. schmitti is particularly vulnerable to overexploitation through artisanal fishing and as victims of bycatch.

In addition, M. schmitti has a low level of genetic diversity, further putting the species at risk. M. schmitti has been found to severely lack genetic structure and low nucleotide diversity. While still not fully understood, it is widely hypothesized to be due to a bottleneck event and selection or expansion.
