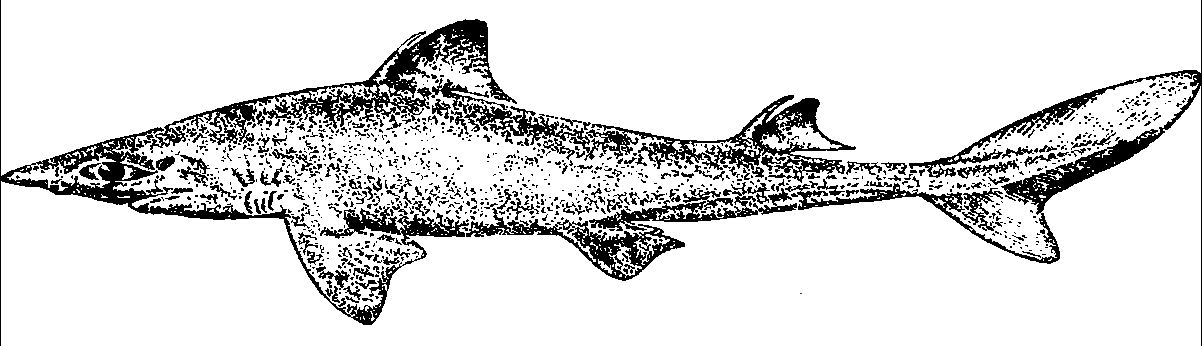
- S. montalbani from the original description of the species in 1912.

Conservation status
- Vulnerable (IUCN 3.1)

Scientific classification
- Kingdom: Animalia
- Phylum: Chordata
- Class: Chondrichthyes
- Subclass: Elasmobranchii
- Division: Selachii
- Order: Squaliformes
- Family: Squalidae
- Genus: Squalus
- Species: S. montalbani

Binomial name
- Squalus montalbani Whitley, 1931

Synonyms
- Squalus philippinus Smith and Radcliffe 1912 (see text)

= Squalus montalbani =

Philippines spurdog

Species of shark

Squalus montalbani, the Philippine spurdog or Indonesian greeneye spurdog, is a relatively large species of dogfish shark native to waters off the coast of Australia, the Philippines, and Indonesia. The species was identified in 1912 from a specimen caught off the coast of Luzon Island, and has been both bycatch and a targeted species in fisheries since. Its taxonomy is complex, having been renamed in 1931, being misidentified as a type of shortspine spurdog, then being revived as a species in 2007.

It is classified as vulnerable by the International Union for Conservation of Nature (IUCN) due to past and present threats from fisheries. It is morphologically similar to several other species, which makes identification difficult. The species is identified as a member of the mitsukurii group, a species complex The similarity to other species has posed problems in identifying trends in the species, and thus, in its conservation.

== Biology, anatomy, and appearance ==
S. montalbani is relatively large, in comparison to other dogfish sharks. Females, with a maximum total length of 94.5 centimetres (37.2 in) are generally larger than males, which have a maximum total length of 84.0 centimetres (33.1 in). The spines on the dorsal fin are low, like others in the mitsukrii species complex.

Coloration patterns are similar to others in the mitsukrii group: The dorsal surface is a light grey, and the ventral surface is white. The caudal bar is a dark bar found on the caudal fin of some species, including some sharks. Like other sharks in the mitsukurii group, the Philippines spurdog has a caudal bar which is dark and almost upright, however the caudal bar extends further in S. montalbani than S. mitsukurii, allowing visual differentiation of the species. An additional coloration pattern distinguishes the two species: a dark blotch on the upper lobe of the caudal fin appears in both S. montalbani and S. mitsukurii, however the placement and shape differs.

Like most sharks, the species is yolk-sac viviparous. The species has been observed with litter sizes of 4-16 pups, with pups developing a yolk sack in utero.

Diet is described in White et al. 2006 "primarily of small fishes, cephalopods and crustaceans," which is repeated by the IUCN.

== Taxonomy ==
The "Philippines spurdog" was first described in 1912 by Hugh McCormick Smith and Lewis Radcliffe, however the binomial name they choose, S. philippinus, is identical to a name previously given to the Port Jackson shark (Heterodontus portusjacksoni). Although S. philippinus is a junior synonym for the accepted binomial name for the Port Jackson shark, and thus is not valid, it is also not valid as a name for the Philippines spurdog either. The species was renamed by Gilbert Percy Whitley in 1931. Thus, although the name S. philippinus predates the accepted name S. montalbani, S. philippinus is considered a junior synonym for the Philippines spurdog and a junior homonym for an invalid name of the Port Jackson shark.

The species was identified as synonymous with S. mitsukurii in several important taxonomic lists, including the first edition of Sharks and Rays of Australia in 1994. and the 1984 Sharks of the World. The conspecificity of S. mitsukurii and S. montalbani was based on overlapping ranges and a substantial morphological similarity. In 2006, a description of the Indonesian greeneye spurdog was given in Economically Important Sharks and Rays of Indonesia and given the temporary binomial name Squalus sp. 1 pending clarification of the classification of the species. The species name S. montalbani was revived and applied to this species after further analysis in 2007, based on morphometric differences and differences in the coloration pattern.

The holotype specimen for the species was collected by Smith and Radcliffe in 1908, during the Philippine expedition. It is a juvenile male, taken from a depth of 432 metres (1,417 ft) off the coast of Sombrero Island in the Philippines. The specimen deposited at the Museum of Natural History (USNM Cat No. 70256).

== Range and habitat ==
S. montalbani, like most other sharks, is exclusively a marine species. It is found in Pacific and Eastern Indian Ocean waters of SE Asia, the Philippines, and Australia. The range in Australian waters extends around the continent, however is most frequently found off the coasts of New South Wales, Queensland, Western Australia. It is found throughout waters of the Philippines and Indonesia. It inhabits water which is warm to temperate. Its range overlaps with other species in the mitsukurii group.

The species is found primarily in deep waters, generally close to the bottom. Specimens of the species have been recovered from depths as deep as 1,370 metres (4,490 ft), and as shallow as 154 metres (505 ft), however the species is usually caught in depths from 383 to 670 metres (1,257 to 2,198 ft). The species has been caught along the upper continental shelf or near islands.

== Conservation and human interaction ==
The species fished in bathydemersal longline fisheries in Indonesia, either as a targeted species or by-catch of other dogfish fisheries. It is eaten, and the fins and liver oil are both economically valuable. The species was also caught in a short-lived fishery based in Esperance, Western Australia during the 1990s, however rapidly declining catches closed the fishery since 1999.

The species was listed as "vulnerable" by the IUCN in 2008 due to threats from fisheries. The similarity of the species to others in the mitsukurii group, and related uncertainty in its taxonomic classification, has posed problems for conservation of the species. Records of the species specifically do not exist, however morphologically similar dogfish underwent a massive collapse in the 1970s off the coast of Australia. Populations probably underwent declines of as much as 97% in some parts of New South Wales as the result of fishing. The IUCN estimated global population of the species to have declined more than 30% from unfished levels and with a decreasing population trend.
