= Honeycomb Izak =

Conservation status
- Endangered (IUCN 3.1)

Scientific classification
- Kingdom: Animalia
- Phylum: Chordata
- Class: Chondrichthyes
- Subclass: Elasmobranchii
- Division: Selachii
- Order: Carcharhiniformes
- Family: Pentanchidae
- Genus: Holohalaelurus
- Species: H. favus

Binomial name
- Holohalaelurus favus Human, 2006

Species of shark

The honeycomb Izak or Natal Izak (Holohalaelurus favus) is a species of shark belonging to the family Pentanchidae, the deepwater catsharks. This species is found in the Western Indian Ocean, near South Africa. It reaches a maximum length of around 50 cm. Since the mid-1970s, no specimens have been collected, even with recent biodiversity research cruises (2002 and 2003).
