= White-spotted Izak =

Conservation status
- Endangered (IUCN 3.1)

Scientific classification
- Kingdom: Animalia
- Phylum: Chordata
- Class: Chondrichthyes
- Subclass: Elasmobranchii
- Division: Selachii
- Order: Carcharhiniformes
- Family: Pentanchidae
- Genus: Holohalaelurus
- Species: H. punctatus

Binomial name
- Holohalaelurus punctatus (Gilchrist, 1914)
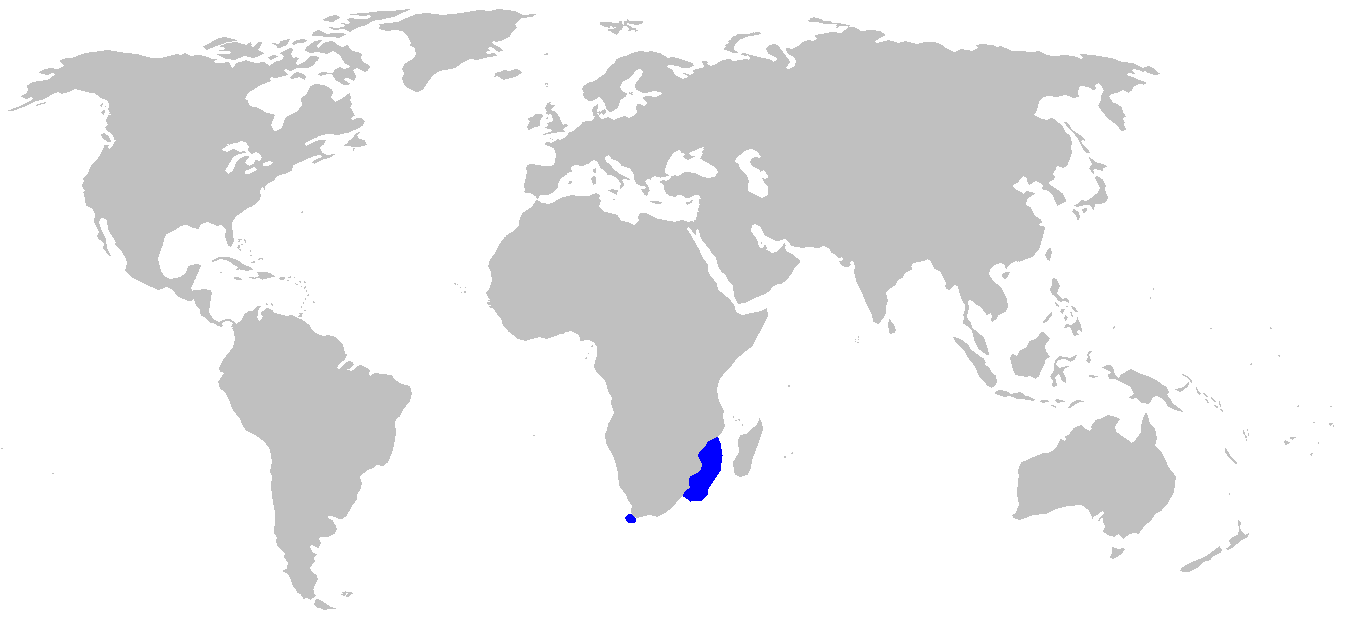

Species of shark

The white-spotted Izak or African spotted catshark (Holohalaelurus punctatus) is a species of shark belonging to the family Pentanchidae, the deepwater catsharks. It is found in the western Indian Ocean off the coasts of Natal, South Africa, southern Mozambique, Madagascar, Kenya, and Tanzania between latitudes 4° S and 37° S, at depths of between 220 and 440 m. It can grow up to 35 cm in length.

== Taxonomy ==
The white-spotted Izak or African spotted Catshark is classified under the genus Holohalaelurus, and belongs to the species H.punctatus. They have two scientific names that are considered synonyms and they are Holohalaelurus polystigma (Regan, 1921), and Scylliorhinus punctatus Gilchrist, 1914.

Most commonly referred to as the African Spotted Catshark, resides along the upper continental slope at depths of 220–420 m off South Africa, southern Mozambique, and Madagascar in the Western Indian Ocean. They are small sharks only getting to 34 cm in length. Adult males in this species tend to grow larger than females which is a rare occurrence in shark species.

== Physical appearance ==
Male sharks range between 24 and 33 cm long and female sharks range between 22 and 24 cm long. The longest ever recorded ever was 34 cm long. Their shorter bodies hold dermal denticles in the middle of the back, and consist of a broad head with a short snout. They have a large mouth with different variations of the amount of teeth based on male or female. They also hold a long and slender tail.

== Habitat and ecology ==
The H.punctatus is native to the upper continental slope ranging from Madagascar, Mozambique, and South Africa in the Western Indian Ocean. They can be found at depths of 220m to 420m. They reach adult hood around 9 years old and have a life expectancy of 21 years. Their diet consist of small bony fish, crustaceans, and cephalopods. The female reproduction is oviparous with eggs being laid in pairs. Other than that their reproductive status is much unknown including their reproductive periodicity.

== Conservation ==
Currently there are no conservation organizations that are actively protecting the sharks. There is a small number of Marine Protected Area (MPAs) in the region in which the species lives. Even though this does not directly involve the African spotted catshark, it can provide it some protection. Until more information about population, life expectancy, and catch rates is discovered there is not likely to be conservation efforts.

=== Threats ===
The main threat to the African Spotted Catshark is deep-water demersal trawl fisheries. These operations occur at depths of 100–600 meters well within the range depth of the sharks. As of record there have been 2 to 3 vessels that carry out these operations at one time which occur around 1,000 times a year. There is information on these operations but there are no reliable information on what fish have been caught. Another issue is that the fishing pressure in Madagascar is increasing and getting more intense. pollution in the area is also impacting the environment in a negative context and damaging their habitat.

== See also ==
- List of sharks
