= Shark attack prevention =

Means to reduce the risk of shark attack

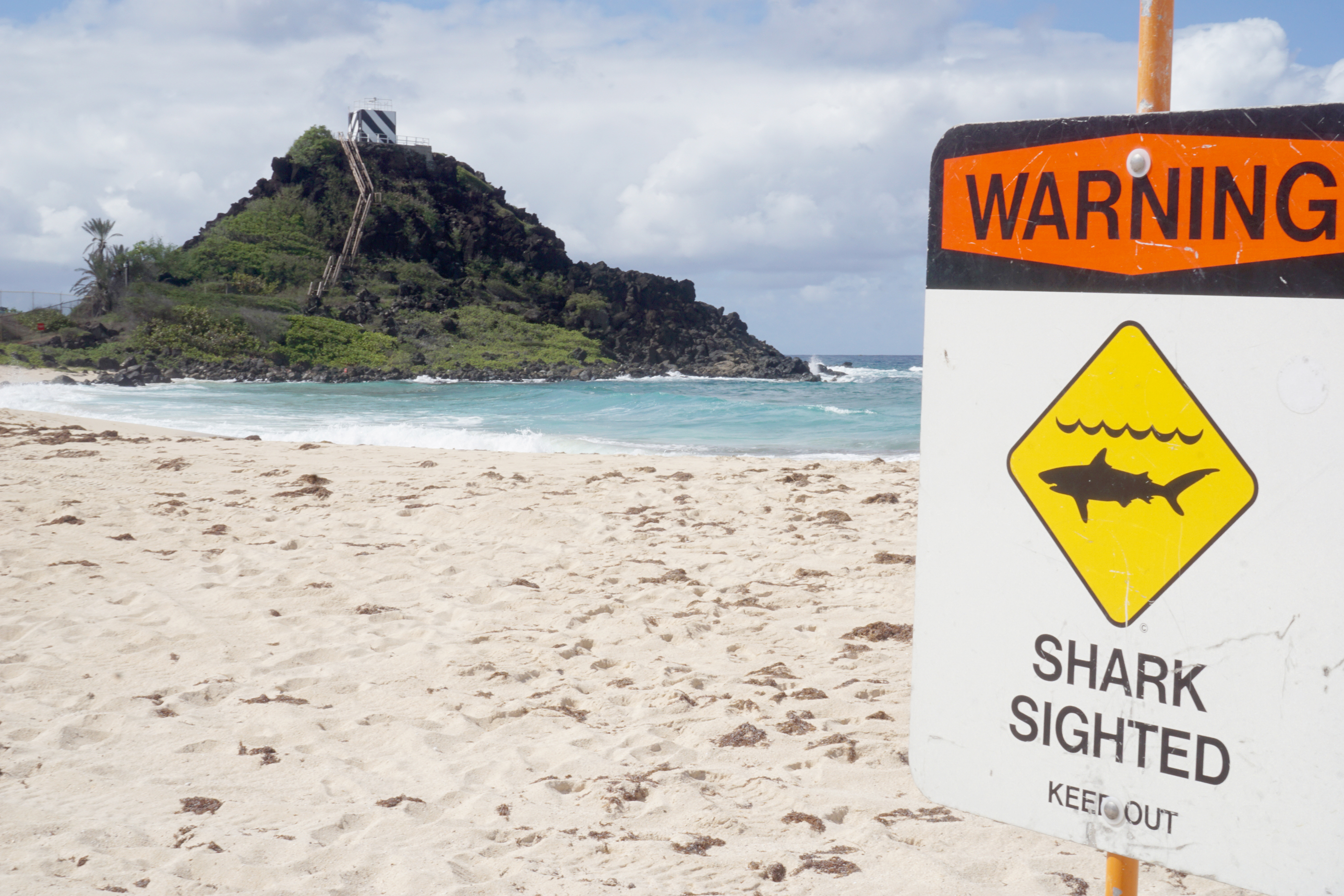
A sign at Pyramid Rock Beach in Hawaii warning about a shark sighting, 2015

There are a range of shark attack prevention techniques employed to reduce the risk of shark attack and keep people safe. They include removing sharks by various fishing methods, separating people and sharks, as well as observation, education and various technology-based solutions.

Techniques that involve culling sharks are contentious. Environmental groups have voiced concern over the impact of reduced shark numbers on ocean ecosystems and the problem of by-catch of other marine life, particularly endangered species. Because sharks are important to the ecosystem, removing them harms the ecosystem.

== Nets ==
=== Shark net ===
Simplified diagram of shark net

The majority of shark nets used are gillnets, which is a wall of netting that hangs in the water and captures the targeted sharks by entanglement. The nets may be as much as 186 metres (610 ft) long, set at a depth of 6 metres (20 ft), have a mesh size of 500 millimetres (20 in) and are designed to catch sharks longer than 2 metres (6.6 ft) in length.

Shark nets do not offer complete protection but work on the principle of "fewer sharks, fewer attacks". They reduce occurrence via shark mortality. Shark nets such as those in New South Wales are designed to entangle and capture sharks that pass near them. Historical shark attack figures suggest that the use of shark nets does markedly reduce the incidence of shark attack when implemented on a regular and consistent basis.

A downside with shark nets is that they do result in bycatch, including threatened and endangered species. Between September 2017 and April 2018, 403 animals perished in the nets in New South Wales, including 10 critically endangered grey nurse sharks, 7 dolphins, 7 green turtles and 14 great white sharks. However note that bycatch from shark nets is minor compared to bycatch from commercial fishing with estimates of 50 million sharks caught unintentionally each year.

Total cost for the shark netting program in New South Wales for the 2009/10 year was approximately A$1 million, which included the cost of the nets, contractors, observers and shark technicians, shark meshing equipment (dolphin pingers and whale alarms etc.), and compliance audit activities. For the 51 beaches protected, this represents a financial cost of approximately A$20,000 per beach per year.

Shark nets have been criticized by environmentalists and conservationists; they say shark nets damage the marine ecosystem. The current net program in New South Wales has been described as being "extremely destructive" to marine life; it has also been called "outdated and ineffective". The New South Wales government prohibits people from rescuing entangled animals — this prohibition has been called "heartless and cruel".

=== Shark barrier ===
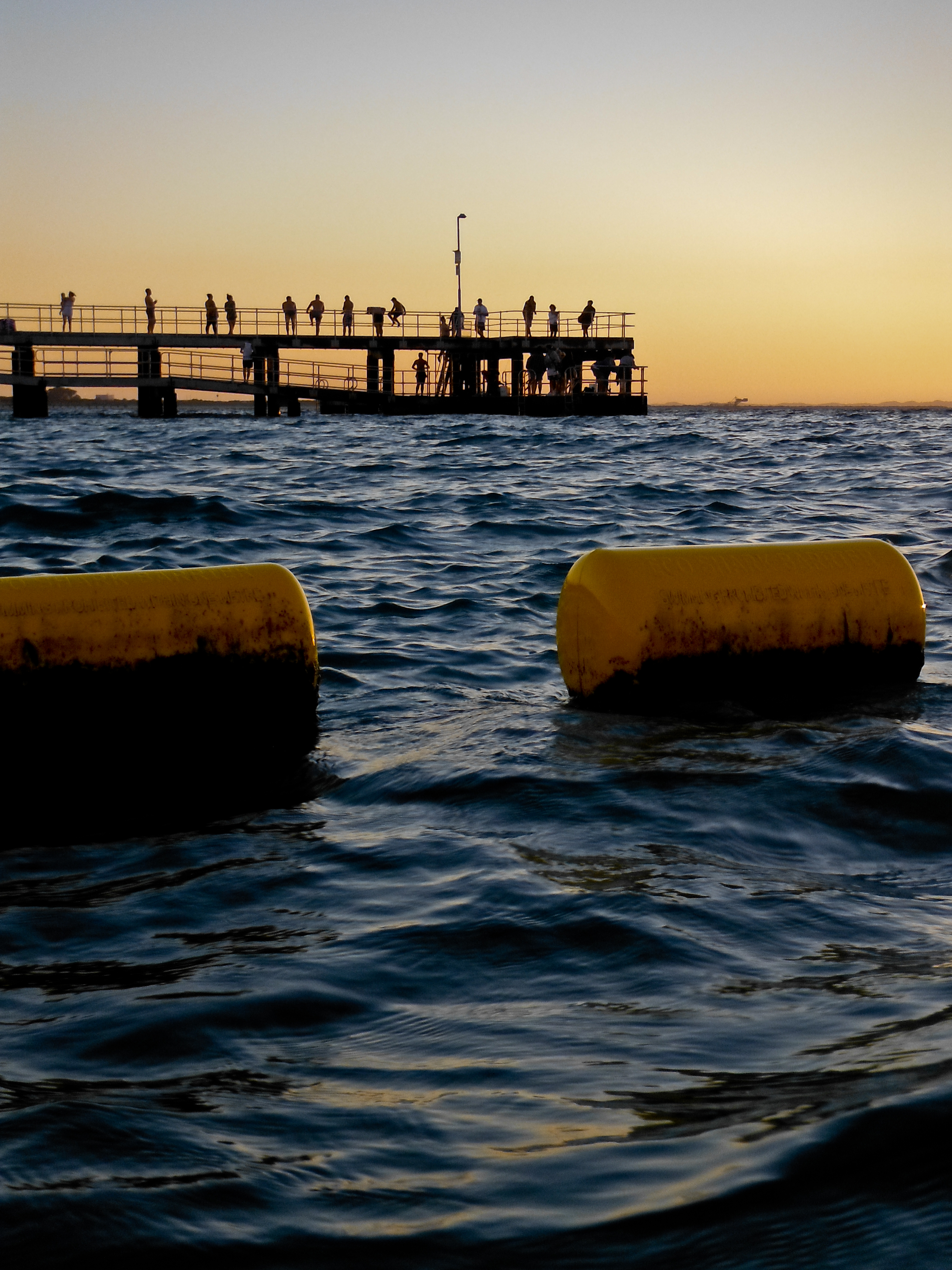
Coogee Beach shark barrier floats and jetty

A shark barrier (otherwise known as a "shark-proof enclosure" or "beach enclosure") is seabed-to-surface protective barrier that is placed around a beach to separate people from sharks. Shark barriers form a fully enclosed swimming area that prevents sharks from entering. Shark barrier design has evolved from rudimentary fencing materials to netted structures held in place with buoys and anchors. Recent designs have used plastics to increase strength and versatility.

When deployed in sheltered areas shark barriers offer complete protection and are seen as a more environmentally friendly option as they largely avoid bycatch. However barriers are not effective on surf beaches because they usually disintegrate in the swell and so are normally constructed only around sheltered areas such as harbour beaches.

A shark barrier installed at Middleton beach in Albany, Western Australia cost A$340,000 to install, with annual maintenance budgeted at A$30,000 per annum. On Réunion Island in 2015 two shark proof enclosures cost €2 million to install and €1 million a year to maintain.

== Drum lines ==
A drum line is an unmanned aquatic trap used to lure and capture large sharks using baited hooks. They are typically deployed near popular swimming beaches with the intention of reducing the number of sharks in the vicinity and therefore the probability of shark attack. Drum lines were first deployed to protect users of the marine environment from sharks in Queensland, Australia in 1962. During this time, they were just as successful in reducing the frequency of shark attacks as the shark nets. More recently, drumlines have also been used with great success in Recife, Brazil where the number of attacks has been shown to have reduced by 97% when the drumlines are deployed. While shark nets and drum lines share the same purpose, drum lines are more effective at targeting the three sharks that are considered most dangerous to swimmers: the bull shark, tiger shark and great white shark. SMART drumlines can also be utilised to move sharks, which greatly reduces mortality of sharks and bycatch to less than 2%.

In 2014 a three-month trial utilising up to 60 drum lines in Western Australia cost A$1.28 million.

Drum line programs that involve culling have been criticized for being environmentally destructive and speciesist, and have sparked public demonstrations and vocal opposition, particularly from environmentalists, animal welfare advocates and ocean activists. Conservationists say the death of sharks on drum lines harms the marine ecosystem. The current drum line program in Queensland has been called "outdated, cruel and ineffective". However environmental damage from drumlines is minor compared to commercial fishing with estimates of 50 million sharks caught unintentionally each year.

== Other protection methods ==
=== Moving sharks ===
Moving sharks is a way of reducing shark attacks and reducing shark mortality, by capturing, transporting and releasing the sharks further shore. In Recife, Brazil, sharks that were near shore were captured and physically moved offshore with 70% of potentially aggressive sharks and 78% of other animals caught released alive. Sharks that were moved did not return to the same location. This technique has also been successfully demonstrated in the NSW North Coast SMART drumline trial (Australia) where 99% of targeted sharks and 98% of other animals caught were released alive.

=== Electronic shark deterrents ===
Electronic devices create an electromagnetic field to deter shark attacks and are used by surfers, scuba divers, snorkelers, spearfishers, ocean kayak fishers, swimming areas off boats and for ocean fishing. The Ocean Guardian devices, marketed with the Shark Shield brand name, are considered one of the few electrical devices on the market that has performed independent trials to determine the effectiveness at deterring shark attacks. Whilst it is noted the Shark Shield technology does not work in all situations and divers have been attacked whilst wearing Shark Shield, modelling research from Flinders University in 2021 indicated that the proper use of personal electronic deterrents is an effective way to prevent future deaths and injuries. It was estimated that these devices could save up to 1063 Australian lives along the coastline over 50 years.

The West Australian government in 2017 announced that they are supporting the Ocean Guardian FREEDOM7 and the Ocean Guardian FREEDOM+ Surf via a $200 subsidiary.

=== Shark tagging and tracking ===
Across the world a sample of sharks have been tagged with electronic devices that transmit their location. Acoustic tags transmit pulses which are detected by underwater listening stations when the sharks swim close by, typically within 500 metres. Fin-mounted satellite tags are also commonly used. These tags allow shark movements and behaviour to be monitored and studied and swimmers and surfers can be warned if a shark is detected close to shore.

However a limitation with the system is the tagging will only highlight a very small portion of the dangerous sharks present. It also may lead people into a false sense of security.

=== Shark spotting ===
Shark-spotting programs using drones, fixed-wing aircraft, helicopters, patrol boats, beach patrols, observation towers and even blimps, are being used and trialled in various locations across the globe. However visibility issues with water clarity can be a problem particularly with aerial patrols, which have been found to identify less than 20% of sharks present. There is also the financial cost of hiring aircraft and/or personnel to conduct the surveillance.

=== Personal shark repellents ===
A shark repellent is any method of driving sharks away from an area and includes magnetic shark repellent, electropositive shark repellents, electrical repellents (including Shark Shield) and semiochemicals. One example is a product called Anti-Shark 100 which is an aerosol can that contains an extract of dead shark tissue. There is a range of evidence that supports the effectiveness of this product. Chemical repellents have been researched since before the 1940s, some of which have raised concerns as to their effectiveness. The semiochemical used in the Anti-shark 100 product have been independently tested & verified on Caribbean reef sharks, however there are concerns it may attract Tiger and White sharks.

Other examples of personal shark protection technologies include wearing interruption patterned or camouflage wetsuits, magnetic repellents incorporating a small magnet in a band worn on the wrist or ankle, acoustic repellents that mimic the sound of orcas and changing surf board colours. However, either the products associated with these technologies have not been independently tested, or independent tests highlighted that they did not work.

In 2018 independent tests were carried out on five Shark Repellent technologies using Great white sharks. Only Shark Shield's Ocean Guardian Freedom+ Surf showed measureable results, with encounters reduced from 96% to 40%. Rpela (electrical repellent technology), SharkBanz bracelet & SharkBanz surf leash (magnetic shark repellent technology) and Chillax Wax (semiochemical) showed no measureable effect on reducing shark attacks.

=== Protection by dolphins ===
There are documented instances of bottlenose dolphins protecting humans from shark attacks, one off the coast of New Zealand in 2004 and one attack on a surfer in northern California in August 2007. There is no accepted explanation for this behavior; as mentioned in the Journal of Zoology, "The importance of interactions between sharks and cetaceans has been a subject of much conjecture, but few studies have addressed these interactions". In some cases, sharks have been seen attacking, or trying to attack dolphins. The presence of porpoises does not indicate the absence of sharks as both eat the same food and surfers have been attacked by sharks whilst in the presence of dolphins.

=== Shark sonar ===
In September 2015, a shark sonar created by Ric Richardson was tested in Byron Bay, Australia. It is a passive sonar device that does not interfere with animals like dolphins. The final device will sit on the ocean floor and claimed to detect sharks over 2,5 meters long when they are 100 meters away. An alarm will notify people that they have to go out of the water. Other shark sonar systems have been tested, however results have concluded that the shark sonar systems are not effective.

== By country ==
=== Australia ===
==== Queensland and New South Wales ====
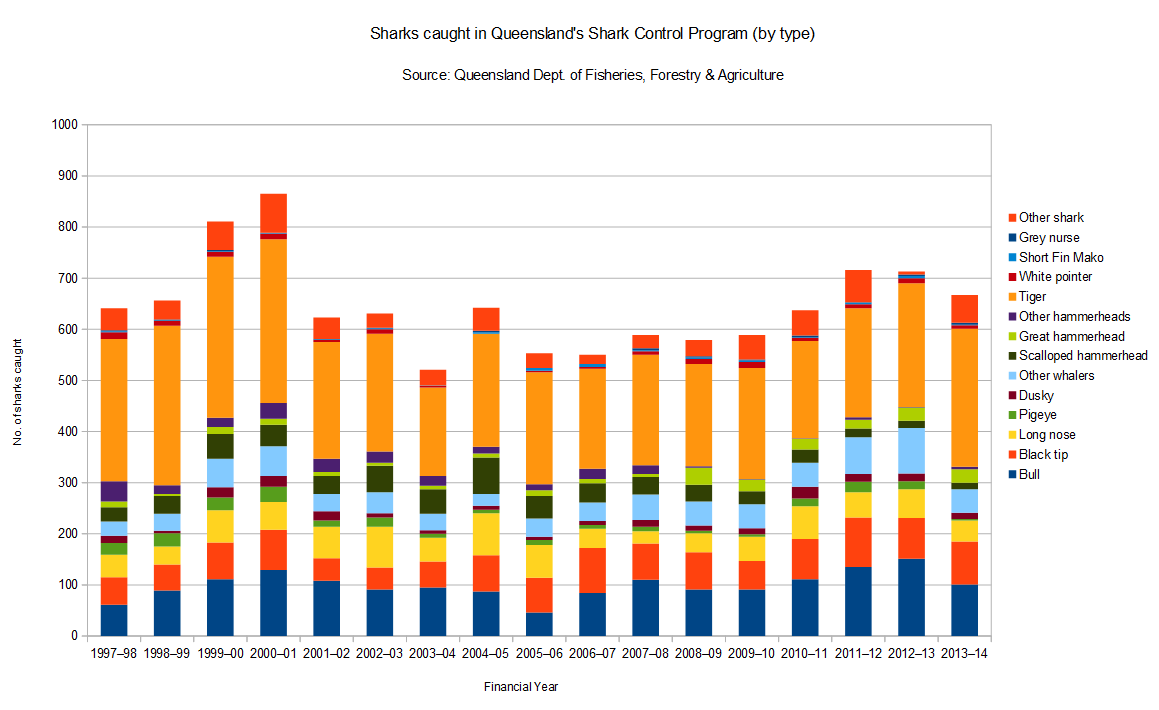
Graph of sharks caught in Queensland's shark control program (by type) July 1997- June 2014

In Queensland and NSW systematic long term shark control programs using shark nets and drumlines are utilised to reduce the risk of shark attack. Since 1936 sharks nets have been utilised off Sydney beaches. Nowadays they are employed on both NSW and Queensland beaches; 83 beaches are meshed in Queensland compared with NSW's current 51.

The technique of setting drum lines is also used in Queensland and New South Wales, where they have been used in association with shark nets. Before 1962, there were 82 recorded attacks. Since the policy was implemented there has only been one recorded death, at Amity Point in January 2006. 21-year-old Sarah Kate Whiley was attacked by as many as three sharks in Rainbow Channel. The attack occurred in an unpatrolled area. Queensland Fisheries Minister John McVeigh has described the longevity of the netting and drum line program as being "a good indicator that it had the support of most Queenslanders".

The baited drum lines attract sharks from within a 3–5 km radius, preventing sharks from reaching swimming areas. They also capture less bycatch than shark nets.

There were a total of 97 fatalities attributed to shark attacks in Queensland between 1858 and 2014. In New South Wales there were a total of 96 fatalities attributed to shark attack between 1771 and 2014.

The current shark mitigation programs in Queensland and New South Wales have been called culls, and have been criticized by environmentalists, who say removing sharks harms the marine ecosystem. Between 1950 and 2008, 577 great white sharks and 352 tiger sharks died in the nets in New South Wales — also during this period, 15,135 marine animals were caught and died in the nets, including whales, turtles, rays, dolphins, and dugongs. In Queensland, from 2001 to 2018, a total of 10,480 sharks died on drum lines.

===== NSW North Coast shark net and smart drumline trial =====
Following 11 shark attacks along the NSW north coast between 2014 and 2016, including two fatalities, Shark nets and SMART drumlines were deployed in December 2016 to cover five additional beaches along the NSW North Coast in a two-year trial. Five nets were deployed off Seven Mile Beach off Lennox Head; Sharpes, Shelly and Lighthouse beaches off Ballina; and Main Beach at Evans Head. Twenty five drumlines were also deployed among nets at Ballina and Evans Head beaches (15 off Ballina; 10 off Evans Head). The trial was successful with no shark attacks occurring at the protected beaches. The SMART drumline caught 230 targeted sharks with 99% of targeted sharks and 98% of other animals caught were released alive. The SMART drumlines are now being expanded to other NSW regions. The shark net trial caught 11 targeted sharks and had a 54% survival rate for all animals caught and will not be continued.

==== Western Australia ====
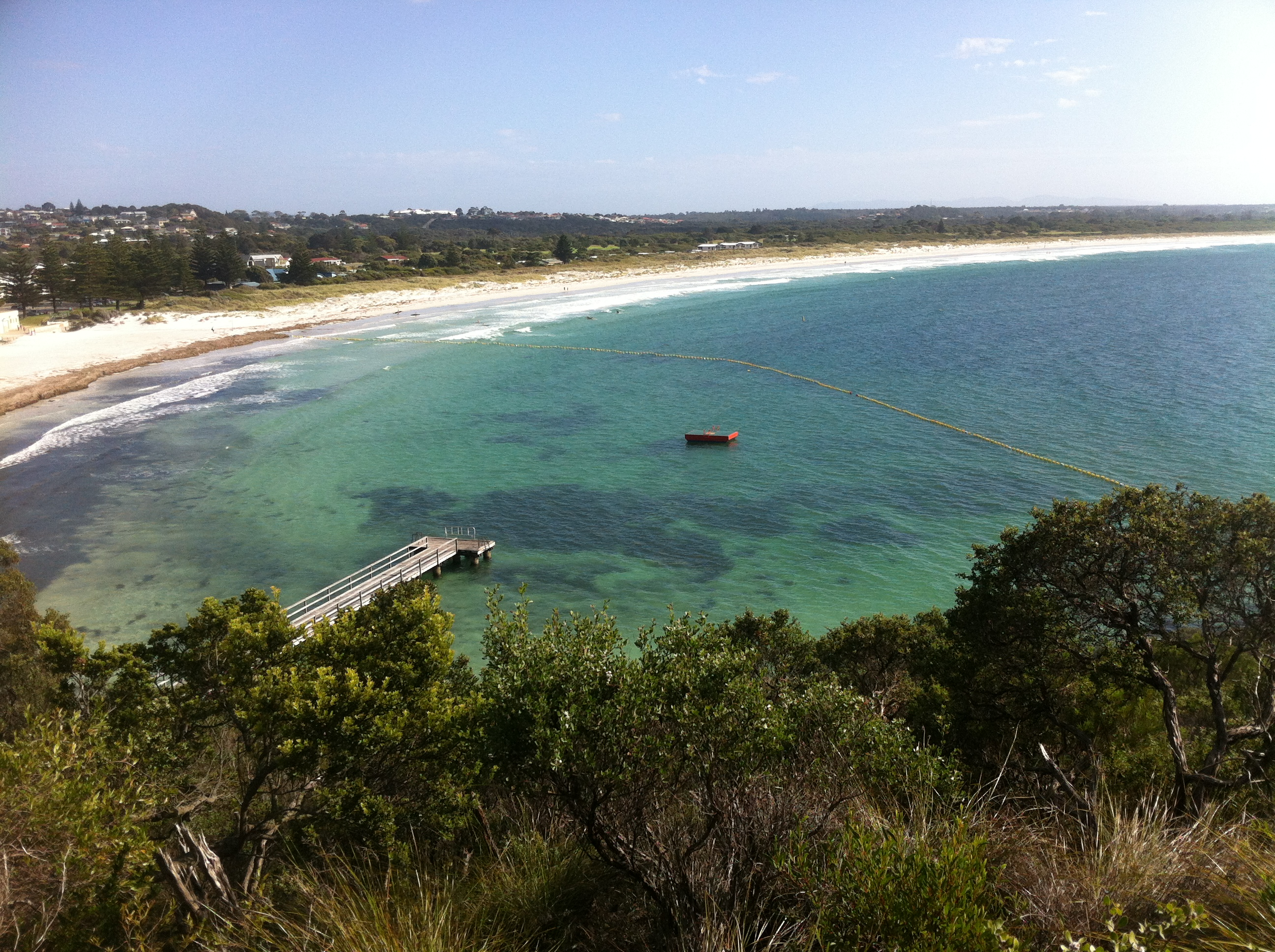
Middleton Beach shark barrier, Albany, Western Australia

In August 2018 following continual shark attacks and public pressure the West Australian state government announced a trial of "smart" drumlines along Western Australia's South West coast, near Gracetown. On the 12 May 2021 the trial ended after only two white sharks were captured and it was concluded the trial did not reduce the risk of shark attack.

Western Australia also deploys shark enclosures in a range of locations as well as aerial shark spotters, beach patrols, shark tagging efforts and associated tracking and notification systems.

There were a total of 114 unprovoked shark attacks in West Australia between 1870 and 2016, including 16 fatalities since 2000.

==== South Australia ====
In South Australia, spotter planes and a small number of patrolled swimming beaches are the only methods used to mitigate the risk of shark attack. On 6 February 2014, Port Lincoln tuna "baron" Hagen Stehr expressed his support for the Western Australian shark cull. He also stated that his business' spotter planes had observed increases in great white shark numbers off the west coast of Eyre Peninsula. He acknowledged that his tuna farming operations attract some sharks. He told The Advertiser that he believed "selected culling of sharks is a must. It is crazy stuff to put them under protection so it becomes a major offence to kill them." Critics of Stehr's stance note that a cull of sharks in SA would be beneficial to his business, as tuna is a major source of food for sharks. Shark attack survivor turned conservationist Rodney Fox has spoken out against the cull, saying "When a shark attacks someone, we go 'the shark needs to be punished'. They don't live under our laws. It's a different world down there and it should be treated differently."

At September 2014, there had been a total of 82 shark attacks in South Australia since 1836, including 20 fatalities.

=== South Africa ===
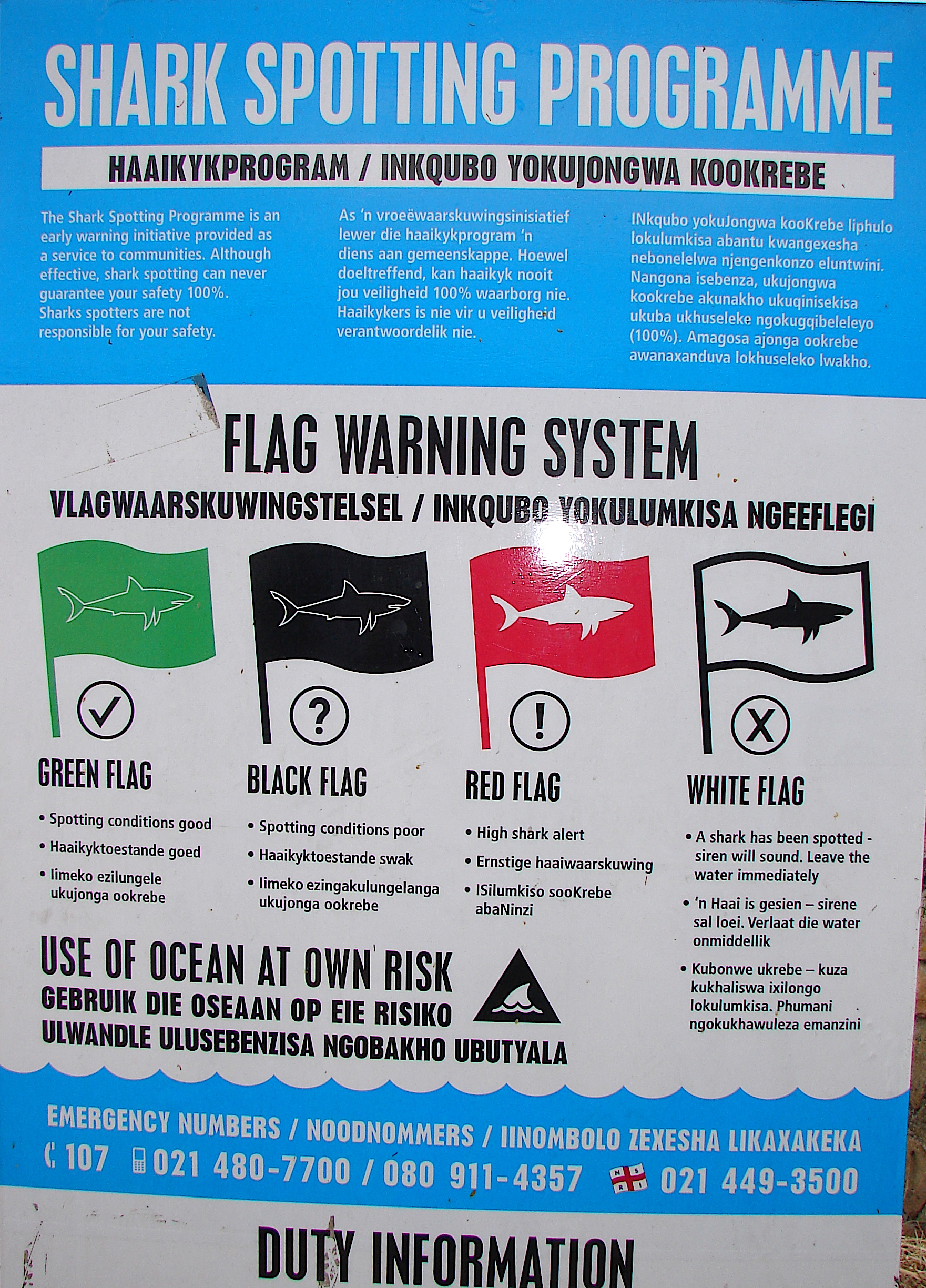
Shark spotting information sign at Noordhoek Beach in South Africa (2015)

In KwaZulu-Natal, South Africa a long term shark control program utilising a combination of shark nets and drum lines are used to mitigate the risk of shark attack. The region's shark attack statistics primarily reflect the effectiveness of netting, as drum lines were only introduced recently, following their successful use for over 40 years in Queensland, Australia. The KwaZulu-Natal Sharks Board (KZNSB) says "Both types of equipment function by reducing shark numbers in the vicinity of protected beaches, thereby lowering the probability of encounters between sharks and people at those beaches." The KZNSB says, "At Durban, from 1943 until the installation of shark nets in 1952, there were seven fatal attacks. Since the installation of nets there have been no fatalities at Durban and no incidents resulting in serious injury." The KZNSB also says, "At KwaZulu-Natal's other [netted] beaches, from 1940 until most of those beaches were first netted in the 1960s, there were 16 fatal attacks and 11 resulting in serious injury. In the three decades since nets were installed, there have been no fatal attacks at those beaches and only four resulting in serious injury." The presence of nets has greatly reduced the number of shark attacks along Natal beaches. It is unclear whether more sharks caught on drum lines survive when compared to shark net captures in KwaZulu-Natal, but the lines have shown reduced non-target species bycatch. Drum lines set in the region are baited with 500 grams of meat per hook and are believed to only attract sharks from several hundred metres away.

Seasonal and temporary bathing bans and "discretionary bathing" are additional strategies employed in the region. Bans often follow net displacement or damage due to storms or swell, or net removal due to whale stranding. Nets are also removed during the annual sardine run to limit the degree of bycatch during the event. Pressure from the tourism industry to reinstate nets during the sardine run has previously proven "disastrous", resulting in large numbers of shark and dolphin mortalities.

The "shark control" program in KwaZulu-Natal has been called "archaic" and "disastrous to the ecosystem" (by environmentalists). In a 30-year period, more than 33,000 sharks have died in KwaZulu-Natal's shark mitigation program — also during this period, 2,211 turtles, 8,448 rays, and 2,310 dolphins died. Environmental groups say KwaZulu-Natal's "shark control" program is unethical and harms the marine ecosystem. Activists in Durban say that Durban's shark nets serve no purpose.

=== United States ===
In Hawaii, seven short term shark culls utilising long-lines took place between 1959 and 1976. During this time, 4,668 sharks were caught, at a cost of US$300,000. Although the Hawaiian resident and tourist human population increased dramatically, the number of shark attacks remained constant (in contrast to Florida, where the number of shark attacks has increased in line with human population increases) and the short term programs were not considered a success by the authors of a shark culling study. The study concluded that the culls "do not appear to have had measurable effects on the rate of shark attacks in Hawaiian waters".

The publication came at a time during intense community debate over culling in Hawaii, documented by local journalist Jim Borg in his 1993 book, Tigers of the Sea, Hawaii's Deadly Tiger Sharks. Borg detailed the debates between the study's authors and other scientists who argued that the experiences of South Africa's KwaZulu-Natal Shark Board demonstrated the effectiveness of the culling. The debate began with the November 1991 shark attack which resulted in the death of Martha Morrell off Maui and embroiled the subsequently formed Hawaii Shark Task Force, Borg writes.

Statistics from 2013 showed the number of shark attacks in Hawaii was spiking.

=== Brazil ===
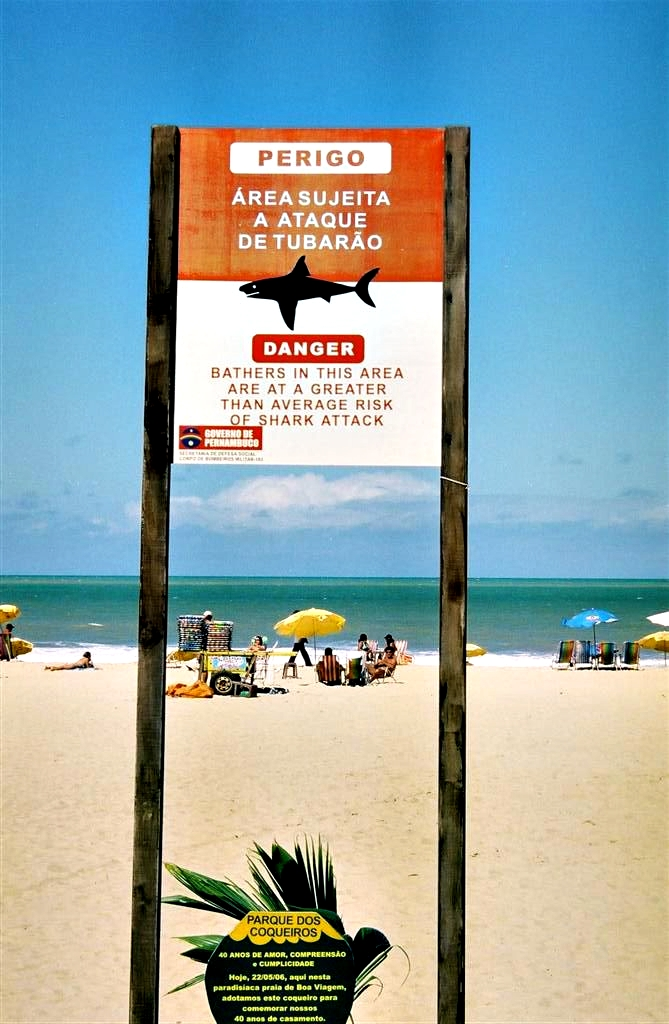
A sign warns of elevated shark attack risk at a beach in Recife, Brazil.

Drumlines and long lines have been used successfully in Recife in a long term program, where shark attacks have been reduced by around 97%. Sharks are initially caught on baited drum lines. Once captured, the sharks (if found alive) are humanely handled and tagged. They are then relocated offshore and their movements are tracked. The project is known as the Shark Monitoring Program of Recife (SMPR). A report assessing the program's performance was published in 2013. It stated: "Overall, the SMPR seems to be less detrimental than shark meshing strategies while clearly contributing for enhancing bather safety; thus, it may provide an effective, ecologically balanced tool for assisting in shark attack mitigation."

=== Réunion Island (France) ===
The prevalence of shark attacks at Réunion Island—there were 19 attacks between 2011 and 2016, including seven which were fatal—prompted Réunion island's government to carry out a range of systematic long term shark protection activities, including a shark cull, utilising "smart" drumlines and longlines. In the five years to August 2016, more than 170 sharks died as part of the cull.

In 2015, two shark-proof fences were strung at beaches to the west of the island, at a cost of €2 million. Maintenance of the fences is projected to cost €1 million a year. The protective nets / shark enclosures at the two beaches have a total length of just under 1 mile and are subject to damage from heavy swell. On 27 August 2016 a surfer lost an arm and a foot from a shark attack while surfing within one of the enclosures. It was reported that at the time of the attack there was a two-meter hole in the nets, most probably caused by the swell.
