= Shark repellent =

Category of animal repellents

A shark repellent is any method of driving sharks away from an area. Shark repellents are a category of animal repellents. Shark repellents are of interest to the commercial fishing industry as well as to swimmers, surfers, and other people in the ocean. Shark repellent technologies include magnetic shark repellent, electropositive shark repellents, electric repellents, and semiochemicals. Some electric repellents may reduce shark interactions with bait by about half, depending on the product, the type of shark, and other factors; the other types are not expected to have a significant protective effect for swimmers.

Shark repellents can be used to protect people from sharks by driving the sharks away from areas where they are likely to harm human beings. In other applications, they can be used to keep sharks away from areas they may be a danger to themselves due to human activity. In this case, the shark repellent serves as a shark conservation method. There are some naturally occurring shark repellents; modern artificial shark repellents date to at least the 1940s, with the United States Navy using them in the Pacific Ocean theater of World War II. However results from modern studies have been mixed with electric shark repellents being independently assessed as the most effective shark deterrent for swimmers.

In addition to shark repellents, there is bite-resistant fabric.

== Types ==
=== Natural repellents ===
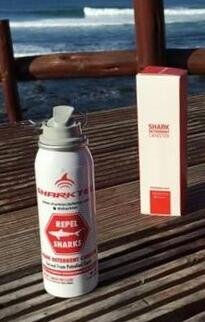
SharkTec shark repellent spray; the active ingredient is a semiochemical derived from putrefying shark meat.

It has traditionally been believed that sharks are repelled by the smell of a dead shark. However, modern research has had mixed results. Semiochemicals have shown some efficacy at getting sharks to leave a feeding area for a few minutes. In 2014, SharkDefense partnered with SharkTec LLC to manufacture the semiochemical in a canister. SharkDefense has been used in commercial fishing to reduce shark by-catch by 71%.

In 2017, the US Navy announced that it was developing a synthetic analog of hagfish slime with potential application as a shark repellent.

Chillax Wax, which is a combination of essential oils intended to mask the scent of a human, showed no measurable effect on reducing shark interactions in one study.

The Pardachirus marmoratus fish (finless sole, Red Sea Moses sole) repels sharks through its secretions. The best-understood factor is pardaxin, acting as an irritant to the sharks' gills, but other chemicals have been identified as contributing to the repellent effect.

=== Electric repellents ===
Electric repellents create an electromagnetic field to deter shark attacks and are used by surfers, scuba divers, snorkelers, spearfishers, ocean kayak fishers, swimming areas off boats and for ocean fishing.

The Ocean Guardian devices, marketed with the Shark Shield brand name, are one of the few electrical devices on the market that has performed independent trials to estimate the effectiveness at deterring about half of shark attacks. Whilst the Shark Shield technology does not work in all situations and divers have been attacked whilst wearing Shark Shield, modelling research suggests that personal electronic deterrents could be an effective way to prevent some future deaths and injuries.

Independent testing of Rpela's electrical repellent technology showed limited efficacy against great white sharks.

=== Magnetic repellents ===
Magnetic repellents rely on magnets, which produce a magnetic field that sharks can detect if they are close enough. For many personal-sized products, a great white shark cannot detect the magnetic field until it is within a few feet (one meter) of the repellent, and is not likely to be deterred until it is within inches. In one study, SharkBanz bracelet & SharkBanz surf leash (magnetic shark repellent technology) showed no measurable effect on reducing shark attacks.

== History ==
Some of the earliest research on shark repellents took place during the Second World War, when military services sought to minimize the risk to stranded aviators and sailors in the water. Research has continued to the present, with notable researchers including Americans Eugenie Clark, and later Samuel H. Gruber, who has conducted tests at the Bimini Sharklab on the Caribbean island of Bimini, and the Japanese scientist Kazuo Tachibana. The future celebrity chef Julia Child developed shark repellent while working for the Office of Strategic Services.

Initial work, which was based on historical research and studies at the time, focused on using the odor of another dead shark. Efforts were made to isolate the active components in dead shark bodies that repelled other sharks. Eventually, it was determined that certain copper compounds like copper acetate, in combination with other ingredients, could mimic a dead shark and drive live sharks away from human beings in the water. Building on this work, Stewart Springer and others patented a "shark repellent" consisting of a combination of copper acetate and a dark-colored dye to obscure the user. This shark repellent, known as "Shark Chaser", was long supplied to sailors and aviators of the United States Navy, initially packaged in cake form using a water-soluble wax binder and rigged to life vests. The Navy employed Shark Chaser extensively between 1943 and 1973. It is believed that the composition does repel sharks in some situations, but not in all, with about a 70% effectiveness rating.

On the other hand, Albert Tester questioned the idea that dead shark bodies or chemicals based on them could work as shark repellent. In 1959, he prepared and tested extracts of decaying shark flesh on tiger sharks in Hawaii and blacktip sharks at Enewetak Atoll. Tester found that not only did the dead shark extracts fail to repel any sharks, but several sharks had a "weak or strong attraction" to them. Tester reported a similar failure to repel sharks by a 1959 test at Enewetak of "an alleged shark repellent, supplied by a fisherman, which contained extract of decayed shark flesh as the principal component." Research continued into the 2000s on using extracts from dead sharks or synthesizing such chemicals.

Since the 1970s, there have been studies of how the Moses sole repels sharks, with Clark and Gruber both studying it. As of 2004 it has not found practical use, however, as the chemicals are perishable, and the repellent had to be injected into the shark's mouth to be effective; in nature the substance is secreted on the skin and is thus ingested by sharks when they bite the sole.

Since the 1980s, there is evidence that surfactants such as sodium lauryl sulfate can act as a shark repellent at concentrations of the order of 100 parts per million. However, this does not meet the desired "cloud" deterrence level of 0.1 parts per million.

== In popular culture ==
The 1947 Robb White book Secret Sea mentions a copper acetate shark repellent developed by the U.S. Navy.

The Sharkfighters is a 1956 film with a fictional storyline based on work by the U.S. Navy during World War II to develop a shark repellent.

In a scene in the 1966 film Batman, an exploding shark jumps from the water and grabs Batman's leg while he is hanging onto the ladder of a helicopter. Batman tries to punch the shark back to the ocean, but it does not affect the shark. He is handed a canister of Oceanic Bat-Spray, making the shark open its jaw and explode.

In a 2015 a MythBusters episode, the hosts Adam Savage and Jamie Hyneman used an extract of dead sharks, and were able to drive away 10-20 Caribbean reef sharks and nurse sharks in only a few seconds on two occasions. The repellent used consisted of extracts from other species of shark bodies, and sharks did not return for over five minutes on both occasions.

== See also ==
- Chain mail
- Bear spray
- Shark attack prevention
