= Western Australian shark cull =

Former policy to reduce sharks attacks

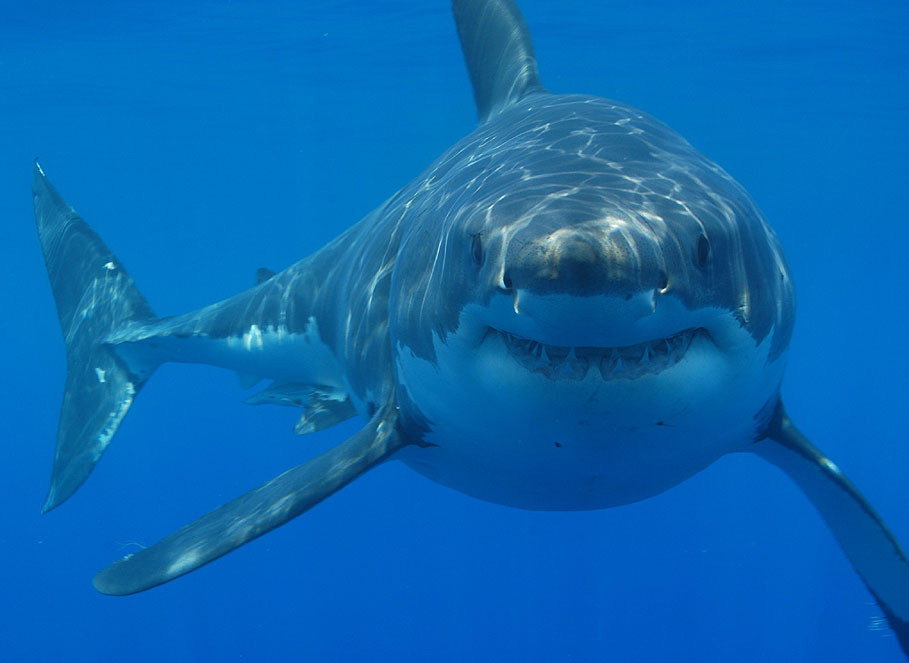
Great white sharks have been captured and shot in Western Australia's controversial shark culling policy.

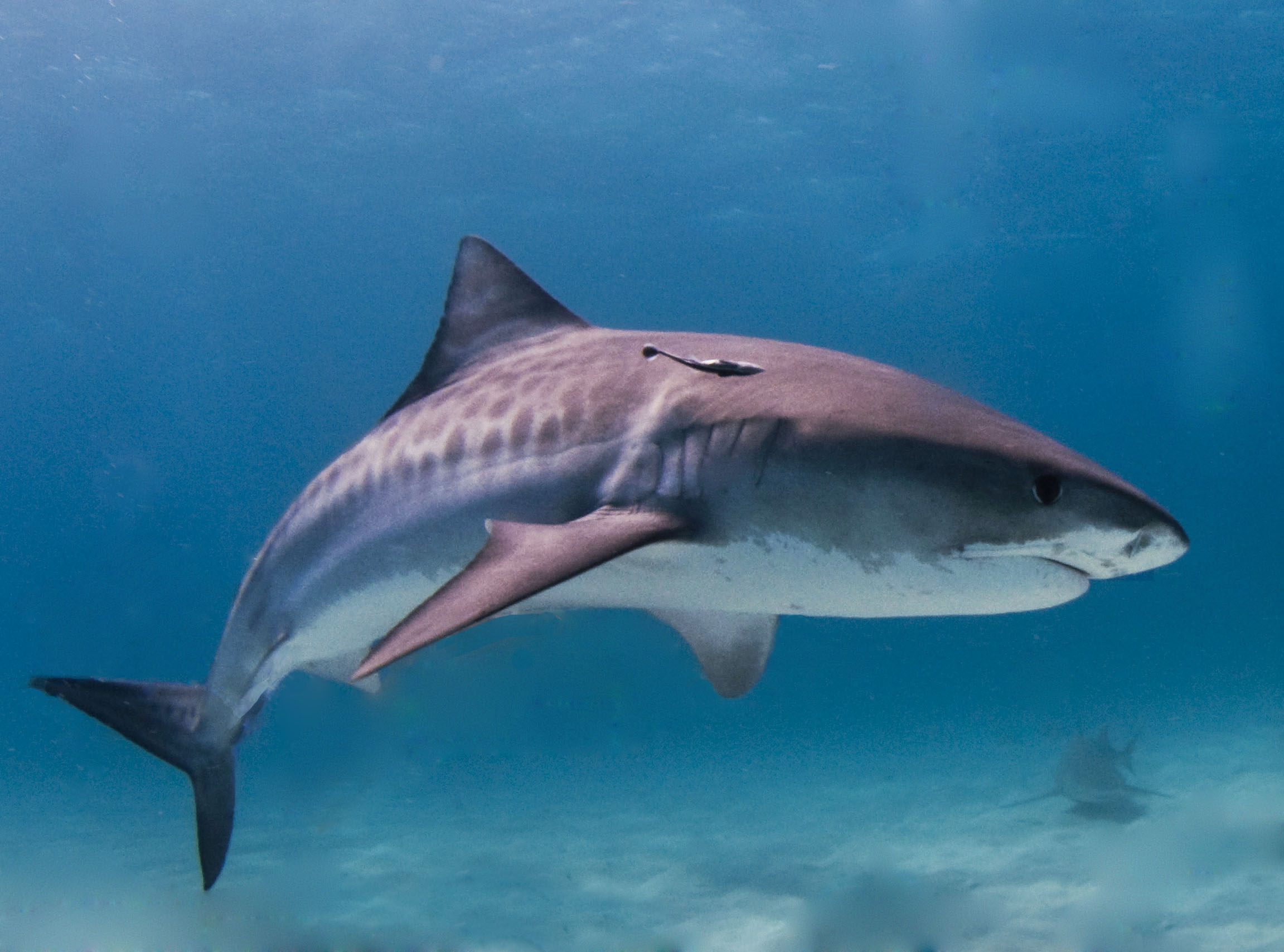
The majority of sharks that were killed in the cull were tiger sharks, despite white sharks being the main target.

The Western Australian shark cull is the common term (Note: The government did not use the term cull in its initial statement, and has denied that it is a cull.) for a former state government policy of capturing and killing large sharks (shark culling) in the vicinity of swimming beaches by use of baited drum lines. The policy was implemented in 2014 to protect human swimmers from shark attack following the deaths of seven people on the Western Australian coastline in the years 2010 to 2013. National public demonstrations opposing the policy attracted international attention to the issue. In September 2014 the seasonal setting of drum lines was abandoned following a recommendation made by the Western Australian Environment Protection Authority. From December 2014 to March 2017, the special deployment of drum lines was permitted in cases where sharks were deemed to present a serious threat to public safety. This policy allowed the government of Western Australia to kill "high-hazard" sharks it found to be a threat to humans; the policy was criticized by senator Rachel Siewart for damaging the environment. In March 2017 the use of drum lines was abandoned by the newly elected West Australian state government. In August 2018 following continual shark attacks the West Australian state government reversed their position and announced a 12-month trial of "SMART" drumlines along Western Australia's South West coast, near Gracetown.

== Justification and policy ==
Australia has the highest number of fatal shark attacks in the world, with Western Australia recently becoming the deadliest place in the world for shark attacks, with the number of total and fatal shark bites growing exponentially over the last 40 years. Since 2000 there have been 17 fatal shark attacks along the West Australian coast. In the south west of Western Australia the chances of a surfer having a fatal shark bite in winter or spring are 1 in 40,000 and for divers it is 1 in 16,000. In comparison to the risk of a serious or fatal cycling accident, this represents three times the risk for a surfer and seven times the risk for a diver.

In response the Western Australian state government at the time, led by Premier Colin Barnett and Fisheries Minister Troy Buswell, developed a policy that authorises and funds the deployment of drum lines near popular beaches: baited mid-water hooks designed to catch and kill great white sharks, bull sharks and tiger sharks. All sharks found hooked but still alive and measuring over three metres (9 ft 10 in) in length are to be shot and their bodies disposed of at sea.

The principle behind the policy is to reduce the threat of shark attacks at popular coastal locations. It aims to achieve this by reducing the number of potentially life-threatening sharks by attracting them to baited hooks, rather than to human activity.

Following a change in the Western Australian state government in March 2017, the newly elected Premier Mark McGowan and Fisheries Minister David Kelly stated that they do not support the previous governments' drumline policy. In August 2018 this policy was reversed when a 12-month trial of "smart" drumlines was announced.

== Implementation ==
The use of 72 drum lines to bait and hook large sharks in Western Australian waters was implemented in January 2014. Two "marine monitored areas" have been established, stretching 1 km (3,300 ft) off shore from Quinns to Warnbro in the Perth metropolitan area, and Forest Beach to Cape Naturaliste and Prevelly in the state's south. Sharks larger than 3 m (9 ft 10 in) found in these areas are to be hunted and killed by professional fishermen.

Australia's Federal Environment Minister Greg Hunt granted the WA Government a temporary exemption from national environment laws protecting great white sharks, to allow the otherwise illegal acts of harming or killing the species.

Ken Baston replaced Buswell as Fisheries minister on 11 December 2013 and is currently the minister responsible for the policy.

=== Cost ===
Leaked documents revealed that the fishermen are being paid $610,000 for 107 days of work setting and maintaining drum lines. The government's suite of shark mitigation measures, which also include increased air patrols, have been estimated to cost $20 million.

== Support ==
Long term shark control programs using shark nets and/or drumlines have been very successful in reducing the incidence of shark attacks at the protected beaches. In Queensland, there has been only one fatal attack on a controlled beach since 1962, compared to 27 fatal attacks between 1919 and 1961. Statistics from the NSW Department of Primary Industries indicate that before nets were introduced in NSW in 1936 there was an average of one fatal shark attack every year. There has been only one fatal attack on a protected beach since then and that was in 1951. Similarly, between 1943 and 1951 the South African city of Durban experienced seven fatal attacks but there have been none since nets were introduced in 1952. A more recent comparison shows that in South Africa there were three shark attacks, none fatal, at protected beaches in KwaZulu-Natal between 1990 and 2011, while there were 20 fatal attacks in the same period at unprotected beaches in the Eastern and Western Cape Provinces.

Drumlines have also been used with great success in Recife, Brazil where the number of attacks has been shown to have reduced by 97% when the drumlines are deployed.

The policy was supported by the ruling of the WA Supreme Court in which Justice James Edelman rejected an application from the Sea Shepherd Conservation Society for an immediate injunction to have the baited drumlines removed.

The Environmental Protection Authority of Western Australia initially ruled out assessing the policy, stating in March 2014 that due to its limited timeframe and small scale the policy posed a negligible risk to the environment. Paul Vogel, the chairman of the EPA, said that public opinion did not form the basis for an environmental impact assessment, and that "The risk assessment and the expert advice we got from competent, professional scientists in this area says there is a negligible risk to the target and non-target species of sharks from this proposal". In April 2014, the Authority announced that it had set a Public Environmental Review level of assessment on shark policy, with a four-week public submission period.

The policy also received the support of a group of surfers in Margaret River.

== Opposition ==
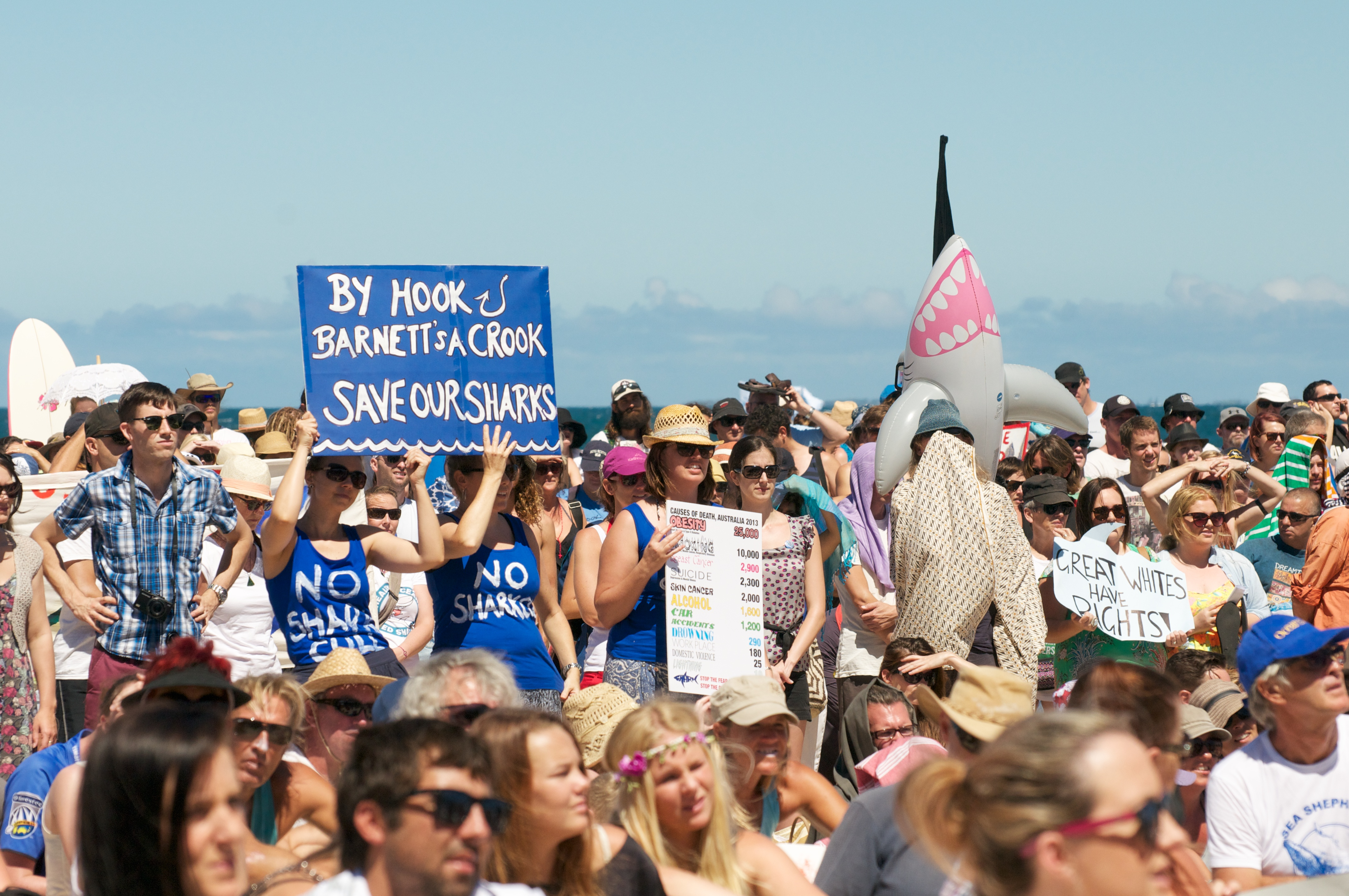
Protesters on Perth's Cottesloe Beach

The policy has been heavily criticised by animal rights activists and their supporters, including those of the Sea Shepherd Conservation Society, No Shark Cull Inc., Humane Society International, Animals Australia, Australian Marine Conservation Society, Greenpeace Australia, Animal Justice Party and Surfrider Foundation.

Several marine scientists from the University of Western Australia have publicly expressed their concerns about the policy, including Jessica Meeuwig, director of the Centre for Marine Futures, Shaun Collin, Professor and Research Fellow of the School of Animal Biology and the Oceans Institute, and Ryan Kempster, shark biologist. They argue that such culls are cruel, unnecessary, unscientific, speciesist, and cause damage to the marine ecosystem.

The Australian Labor Party expressed opposition to the cull, and the Australian Greens political party also condemned the policy.

Celebrities voicing their opposition to the cull include surfer Kelly Slater, golfer Greg Norman (a.k.a. The Shark), shark attack survivor and author Rodney Fox, swimmer and UNEP Patron of the Oceans Lewis Pugh, British comedian Ricky Gervais and actor Stephen Fry. Entrepreneur Sir Richard Branson believes that the culling policy is likely to have an adverse effect on tourism.

Opponents to the policy claim that baiting and culling sharks (particularly the great white shark, which is a federally protected species) to be inhumane, environmentally irresponsible, and ineffective at reducing the incidence of shark attack. Environmental concerns include the bycatch of other marine species, drowning of undersize sharks caught on the hooks and the impact on globally declining shark populations, particularly the great white shark, which is listed on the IUCN Red List as "vulnerable". The IUCN lists global threats to great white sharks to include targeted commercial and sports fisheries, protective beach meshing, and "media-fanned campaigns to kill Great White Sharks after a biting incident occurs". Some people against the policy also believe drum lines have the potential to attract sharks to popular beaches.

Thousands of Australians protested on two national days of action organized by scuba diver Natalie Banks, prior to and following the policy's implementation. The first was held on 4 January and the second on 1 February. Thousands gathered at events around Australia, with largest turnouts at Perth's Cottesloe Beach and Manly, New South Wales. Smaller demonstrations occurred at locations along the New South Wales central coast as well as Adelaide, Melbourne, Hobart and Broome. Protests were also held in New Zealand and South Africa.

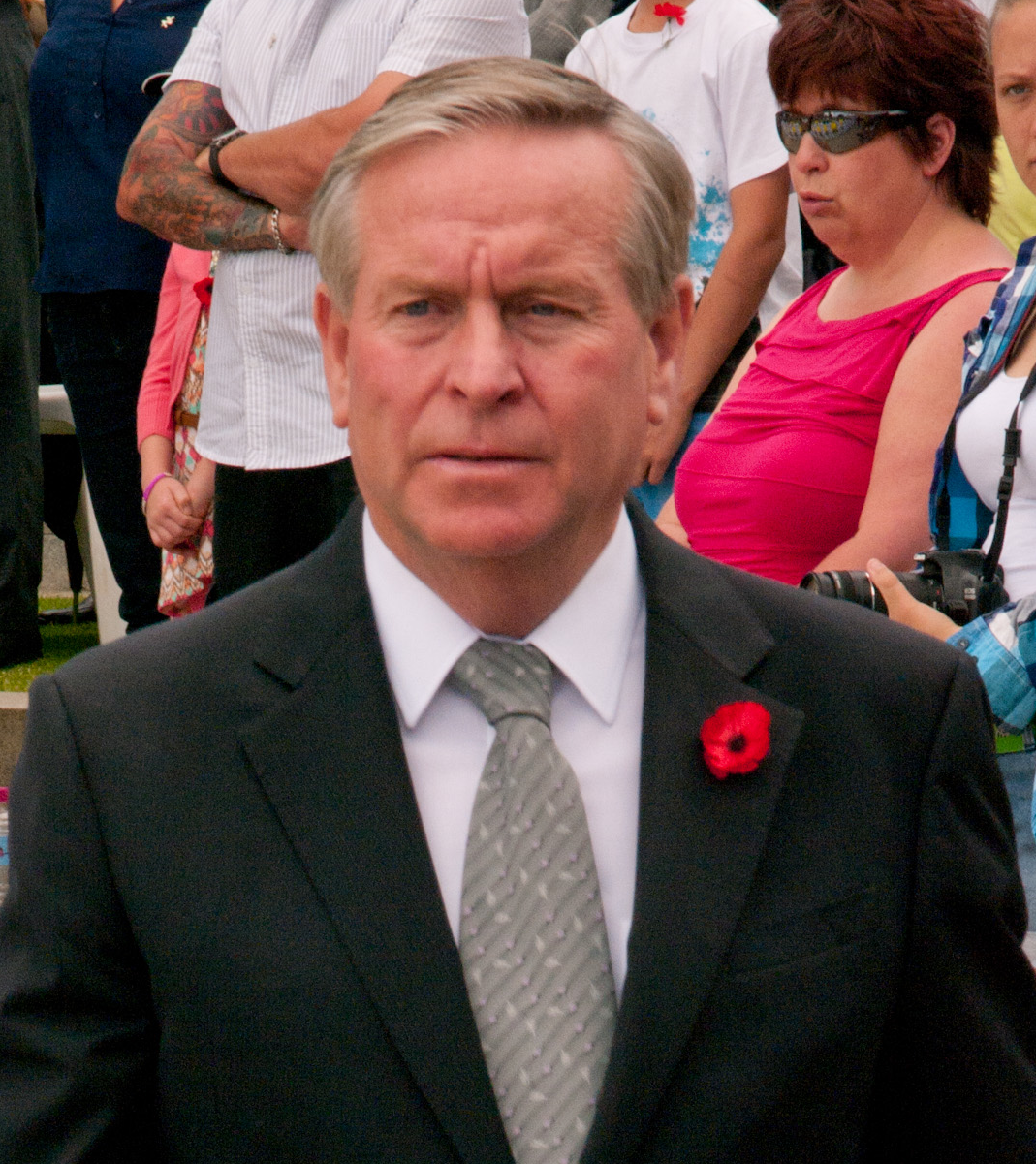
The Western Australian premier Colin Barnett said opposition to killing the sharks was "ludicrous" and "extreme", and nothing can change his mind.

The Leader of the Opposition Mark McGowan spoke against the shark cull policy at an anti-shark cull protest and on social media, and Opposition Fisheries Spokesperson Dave Kelly has also publicly denounced the policy.

The family of Sam Kellett, a man who was eaten by a great white shark, protested the cull and said Kellett would have also opposed the cull if he were alive.

=== Backlash ===
Protesters have drawn criticism for going to extremes to show their displeasure with the policy, including threatening the lives of cabinet ministers and a fisherman's family. The premier's office was also targeted in an attack. Queensland's shark control program manager Jeff Krause said "I'm surprised and disgusted at the extent that they (protesters in WA) are prepared to threaten and vandalise," referring to the threats that prompted at least one contractor to withdraw from the tender process in WA. "Everyone has got their opinion and they are entitled to it and I understand that people say it's the sharks' domain, but I also understand the senseless waste of human life and we have the capability to reduce that risk."

Barnett has dismissed the public opposition as "ludicrous" and "extreme". His government claimed that killing the sharks is not culling them, but is using a "targeted, localised, hazard mitigation strategy".

== History (1960s to 2014) ==
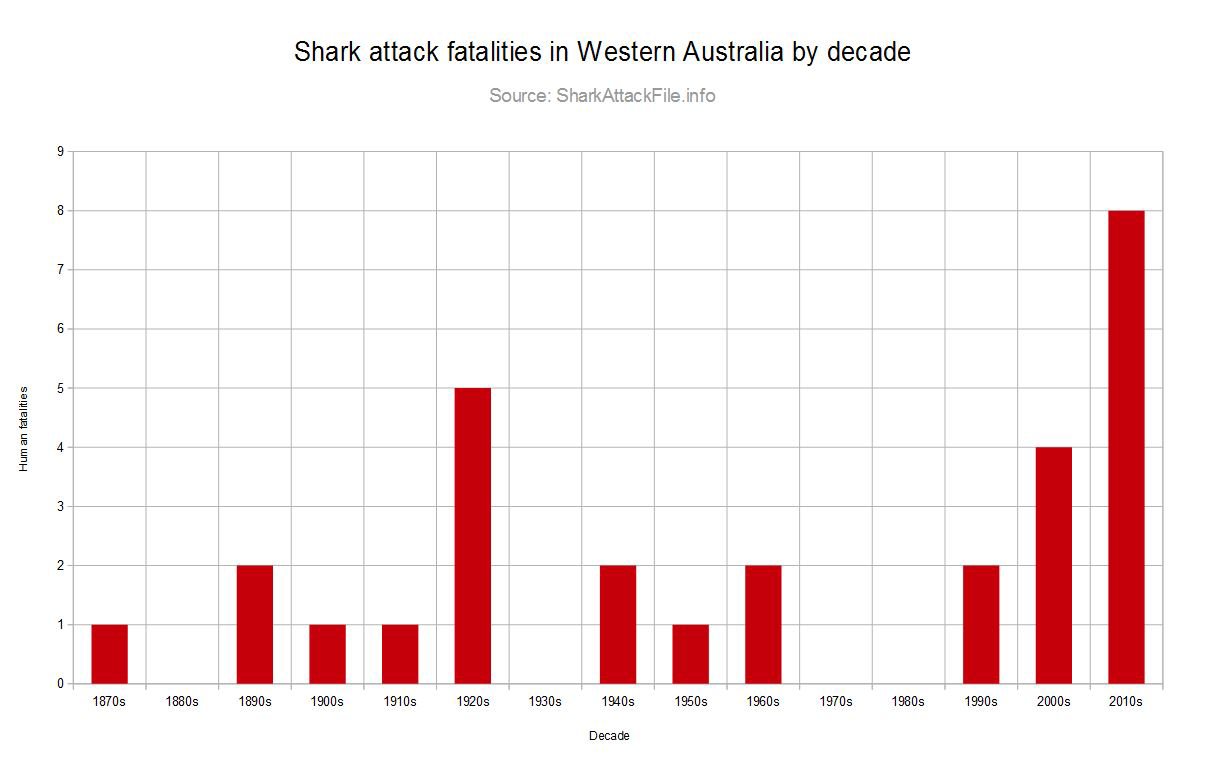
Shark attack fatalities in Western Australia by decade (1850–2014)

=== 1960s ===
In the 1960s, one fatal shark attack occurred in Western Australia. Robert Bartle was taken while spearfishing in Jurien Bay on 19 August 1967.

=== 1968–1992 ===
No fatal shark attacks were recorded in Western Australia during this 24-year period.

=== 1993–1997 ===
In the 1990s, three fatal shark attacks were recorded in Western Australia. Two of the victims were David Alan Weir (1995) and Werner Schonhofer (1997).

=== 2000s ===
During the 2000s, four fatal shark attacks were recorded in Western Australia. The victims were Ken Crew (2000), Bradley Adrian Smith (2004), Geoffrey Brazier (2005) and Brian Guest (2008).

=== 2010 ===
In August 2010, 31-year-old Nicholas Edwards was killed by a shark while surfing at Cowaramup Beach near Gracetown. A witness said he saw a large group of seals swim by moments before the attack.

=== 2011 ===
In September 2011, 21-year-old Kyle Burden was killed near Bunker Bay in WA's south-west. He was attacked by a shark while body boarding.

On 10 October 2011, 64-year-old Bryn Martin was killed at Perth's Cottesloe Beach. He had been swimming to a buoy 500 m (1,600 ft) offshore as part of a daily routine. It was assumed that he was taken by a shark after his torn bathers were recovered. Marks on the bathers were believed to be consistent with the teeth of a great white shark.

In October 2011, 32-year-old US citizen George Thomas Wainwright was attacked by a shark while diving and spear-fishing in Little Armstrong Bay off Rottnest Island. The attack occurred 500 m (1,600 ft) offshore, where no patrols were operating. Within an hour, Fisheries Minister Norman Moore announced plans to catch and destroy the shark. Six drum lines were immediately deployed in the area and discussions of possible future shark culling measures commenced.

=== 2012 ===
On 1 April 2012, 33-year-old Peter Kurmann was taken by a 4 m (13 ft) shark likely to have been a great white. He was diving about 1.6 km (0.99 mi) off Stratham Beach in Geographe Bay, 230 km (140 mi) south of Perth.

In July 2012, 24-year-old Ben Linden was attacked while surfing at "Dolphins" near Wedge Island, 135 km (84 mi) north of Perth. The bite marks in his surfboard indicated that the shark was likely to have been a great white.

In August 2012, the results of a Bond University study comparing potential shark hazard mitigation measures for WA were published. The report recommended against the use of drum lines.

=== 2013 ===
In October 2013, the government announced a plan to trial a shark-proof enclosure at Old Dunsborough Beach near Busselton. A similar barrier was installed at Coogee Beach, south of Fremantle in December 2013. The State Government provided $165,370 to the City of Busselton to run the trial and test the suitability of beach enclosures as a shark protection measure. The Old Dunsborough enclosure was installed in January 2014.

The government followed the recommendations of the 2012 Bond University study, and avoided the use of conventional shark nets, which are known to trap and kill various marine life.

On 23 November 2013, 35-year-old Chris Boyd was attacked by a shark, believed to be a great white. He was surfing at the popular surf break Umbries off Gracetown. A "catch and kill" order was issued to permit the destruction of the shark.

In December 2013, more than 100 professionals who work with sharks signed an open letter to the WA Government calling for non-lethal measures to be used to protect beach-goers, accompanied by increased investment in shark research and monitoring. The letter included the statement: "we do not support the proposed use of lethal shark population control measures such as drum lines or targeted fishing of sharks."

=== 2014 ===
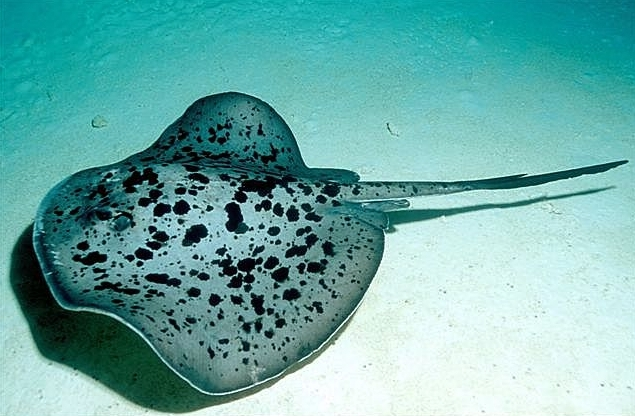
It has been claimed that stingrays and other bycatch are caught also by the drum lines

The first shark was killed under the newly implemented policy on 26 January 2014 near Dunsborough. It was a tiger shark that took a baited drum line hook. It was discovered alive and was subsequently shot and killed. Images of the incident were captured and a "social media storm" ensued. Adding to the controversy, the contractor responsible for the drum lines in the South West originally mis-identified the shark as a bull shark, then later the State Government claimed it to be a black tip reef shark. Barnett's welfare was subsequently threatened and his office vandalised leading to him take increased personal security measures. A "direct action" team of anonymous activists claimed to have removed bait from drum lines, while the government announced that any individual prosecuted for interfering with the lines or their operation could face up to a year in prison and a $25,000 fine. Groups could be fined $50,000. As of 31 January, no-one has claimed responsibility for the removal of baits from lines, despite baits being found to have gone missing from hooks.

On 28 January, activists from Animal Rescue Team and West Australians for Shark Conservation claimed to have recorded video footage of the rescue and release of stingrays caught on the newly set drum lines. The activists challenged the government for downplaying or dismissing the issue of bycatch on drum lines. A fisherman manning the lines said that he believed the hooks were "too large for rays, dolphins or turtles to be caught on". Drum lines deployed in other jurisdictions have been shown to catch dolphins, whales and sea turtles, all of which are fully protected in Australian waters.

During the three weeks following the policy's implementation, 66 sharks were caught. Almost 75 per cent of the sharks caught on drum lines were smaller than three metres (9 ft 10 in). Of the 49 undersized sharks, nine were found dead on the hooks and 40 were released alive. Fisheries officers patrolling beaches in Perth and a contractor in the South-West killed 17 sharks longer than three metres (9 ft 10 in). Figures released on 18 February by Fisheries Minister Ken Baston showed 95 per cent of sharks caught were tiger sharks – a total of 63 animals. According to the State Government's SharkSmart website, tiger sharks "may only have been responsible for one shark bite in WA since 1980". Two Mako sharks have also been found dead on the drum lines.

On 20 February, the State Government denied allegations that a dolphin had been caught on a drum line. The animal was covered by a tarpaulin, a management response that activists had not seen previously. The Government stated that the animal was a tiger shark.

In February, over 10,000 responses were received by the Western Australian Environmental Protection Authority in response to the catch-and-kill shark policy.

For the summer-autumn 2014 season, drum lines remained in place until 30 April 2014. During this period, a total of 172 sharks were caught. Fifty of those were Tiger sharks greater than three metres (9 ft 10 in) in length, which were then killed. None of the sharks caught were great whites. Eight other animals were also captured, including stingrays.

== Events from September 2014 to the present ==
=== Cessation (end of shark cull) ===
In September 2014, the Western Australian Environment Protection Authority recommended against the setting of drum lines in the summers on 2014–2015 and 2015–16. The WA EPA chairman Paul Vogel said there was too much uncertainty about how the policy, which involved killing sharks longer than 3 metres (9.8 ft), would affect the great white shark population. Premier Colin Barnett subsequently announced that the state government would no longer pursue its drum line policy. The announcement was applauded by a number of experts and shark conservationists.

=== Drum line deployment from September 2014 to March 2017 ===
From 2014 to 2017, the Western Australian government retained the option to deploy drum lines under certain circumstances under its "imminent threat" policy. They were deployed in the event of the appearance of a shark or sharks which present a possible threat to public safety. Following the abandonment of seasonal drum line deployment plans in September 2014, drum lines were deployed to kill sharks in Western Australia on at least three occasions.

The first deployment followed a shark attack near Esperance in October 2014. The drum lines caught and killed two great white sharks. The appearance of a large great white shark in Warnbro Sound in December prompted a further deployment which did not result in a capture. Drum lines were also set following a fatal shark attack near Albany on 30 December.

In June 2016 a drum line was set off Falcon Beach in Mandurah following a fatal shark attack on a local surfer. A 4.2-metre (13 ft 9 in) great white was killed and disposed of at sea. A few days later a 60-year-old female diver was killed by a shark in Mindarie, north of Perth, and drum lines were set in that area.

=== Western Australia south west coast SMART drum line trial ===
Following a further increase in shark attacks along the Western Australian coast, including three fatalities between May 2016 and April 2017, public pressure mounted on the West Australian State Government to take action. Since December 2016 SMART drumlines have been deployed along the New South Wales North Coast. During the New South Wales trial, there were no shark attacks occurring at the beaches with the SMART drum lines, and the trial was continued for the 2017/18 summer. Public pressure mounted on the Western Australian State Government to adopt the same non-lethal strategy and use SMART drumlines.

In April 2018 two non-fatal shark attacks near Gracetown led to the cancellation of the Margaret River Pro surfing event. Following these events in August 2018 the West Australian Government bowed to public pressure and announced a 12-month trial of SMART drum lines near Gracetown. Environmental and animal rights groups oppose the SMART drum line trial (they say it will cause animals to suffer). In November 2018, more than 7,000 Western Australians signed a petition demanding that the planned SMART drum line trial be abandoned. On 17 January 2019 the Environmental Protection Authority of Western Australia determined that the SMART drumline trial would have minimal impact on the environment and therefore did not warrant a formal assessment. The trial ran from February 2019 to May 2021, during which time it caught two great whites (the program's nominal target), 266 other sharks, and 43 other marine animals. The Fisheries Minister Don Punch said that the government would not continue to use drumlines.

== Shark culling in other jurisdictions ==
As of 2019, shark culling currently occurs in Queensland, New South Wales, KwaZulu-Natal (South Africa) and Réunion (France), and in each of those jurisdictions, lethal devices (shark nets and/or drum lines) are used to kill sharks – New South Wales uses only shark nets, while Queensland uses both shark nets and drum lines. All of these regions use the term "shark control" for their culls. The current culls in these regions have been criticized by environmentalists, who say killing sharks harms the marine ecosystem.

Between 1950 and 2008, 352 tiger sharks and 577 great white sharks were killed in the nets in New South Wales — also during this period, a total of 15,135 marine animals were killed in the nets in New South Wales, including whales, turtles, rays, dolphins, and dugongs.

Queensland's "shark control" program killed roughly 50,000 sharks between 1962 and 2018 (including in the Great Barrier Reef). In Queensland, sharks caught on drum lines are left to "die in agony", and those that survive are "shot by contractors who [are] employed by the Queensland Government". More than 84,000 marine animals have been killed in Queensland's ongoing shark culling program, including turtles, dolphins and whales. Queensland's shark culling program has been called "outdated, cruel and ineffective". Kelly Wang of One Green Planet said, "Australia's attitude towards its sharks is truly horrific. Their practices show no respect for these beautiful animals at all. Sharks are [viewed as] either a commodity or a pest, instead of a respected fellow species on this planet."

In a 30-year period, more than 33,000 sharks have been killed in KwaZulu-Natal's shark-killing program – during the same 30-year period, 2,211 turtles, 8,448 rays, and 2,310 dolphins were killed in KwaZulu-Natal. The shark-killing program in KwaZulu-Natal is operated by the KwaZulu-Natal Sharks Board. At Réunion Island, drum lines are used in conjunction with long lines. Réunion currently kills about 100 sharks per year.

In Hawaii, a systematic shark cull took place between 1959 and 1976; the cull in Hawaii killed 4,668 sharks. Dunedin, New Zealand culled sharks for 40 years – their cull ended in 2011.

== Alternative strategies ==
Beach patrols and spotter aircraft are commonly used alternatives to netting or deploying drum lines to protect popular swimming beaches. However aerial patrols have limited effectiveness in reducing shark attacks. Opponents of the cull are calling for a variety of non-lethal alternatives to baited drum lines to be implemented as substitute safety measures. These include more comprehensive shark tagging efforts and associated tracking and notification systems, capture and translocation of sharks to offshore waters, research into shark feeding and foraging behaviour, public shark threat education programs and encouraging higher risk user groups (surfers, spear-fishers and divers) to use personal shark protection technology.

In South Australia, spotter planes and patrolled swimming beaches are the methods used by the state government to mitigate against shark attacks. During the late 2000s and early 2010s, drum lines and long lines were used in Recife, Brazil to relocate sharks (though, some marine life died during that program).

=== Personal shark protection ===
Examples of personal shark protection technology include wearing or attaching electronic shark deterrents such as Shark Shield to surfboards, or wearing interruption patterned or camouflage wetsuits to reduce swimmers' visibility to sharks when in the water.

== See also ==
- List of fatal shark-incidents in Australia
- List of threatened sharks
- Shark attack
- Shark attack prevention
- Shark culling
- Speciesism
