= Magnetic shark repellent =

Shark attack prevention device

Magnetic shark repellents utilize permanent magnets, which exploit the sensitivity of the Ampullae of Lorenzini in sharks and rays (electrosense). This organ is not found on bony fish (teleosts), therefore, this type of shark repellent is selective to sharks and rays. Permanent magnets do not require power input, making them practical for use in fisheries and as bycatch reduction devices. An independent study in 2018 found that magnetic shark repellent technology were ineffective in reducing shark attacks.

== History ==
During November 2004, Sharkdefense researcher Eric Stroud accidentally dropped a magnet onto a rubber mat near a captive tank at the Oak Ridge Shark Laboratory. He noticed that juvenile nurse sharks (G. cirratum) near the tank wall swam away. While the initial event may have been due to vibrations, it led him to test the effects of the magnet on the captive sharks. Placing the magnet within the tank, Eric observed that nurse sharks avoided the region around the magnet. Follow-on tests in 2005 with Michael Herrmann at the laboratory used an acrylic Y-Maze and showed preference towards non-magnetic exits and strong conditioning. During February 2005, Patrick Rice and Eric Stroud conducted tonic immobility trials at the Bimini Biological Field Station, Bahamas, which confirmed that juvenile lemon sharks (N. brevirostris) and juvenile nurse sharks (G. cirratum) roused when permanent magnets were presented within 50 cm of the sharks nares. Mobility was not terminated when strong electromagnets were placed near the sharks.

On January 1, 2009, a peer-reviewed publication described experiments in Australia showing the efficacy of using magnets to deter sharks.

On January 12, 2010, Craig O'Connell from SharkDefense also published a peer-reviewed paper on the efficacy of magnetic shark repellents.

In 2014, Sharkbanz released its first commercially available product. The device is a bracelet or anklet which contains a rare-earth magnet.

== Biology ==
Several species of sharks have demonstrated the ability to sense magnetic fields (Kalmijn, 1978; Ryan, 1980; Klimley, 1993; 2002). The Ampullae of Lorenzini organ within sharks is used to detect weak electrical fields at short ranges. The detection range of this organ is effective only within inches, as sharks sense bioelectrical fields in the final stages of prey capture. The flux per unit area of certain permanent magnets, particularly Neodymium-Iron-Boride and Barium-Ferrite magnets, corresponds closely with the detection range of the Ampullae of Lorenzini. The fields generated by these permanent magnets (ferrite and rare-earth types) decrease at the inverse cube of the distance from the magnet to sharks and rays. Therefore, at distances of a few meters from the magnet, the field exerted is less than the Earth's magnetic field. Animals which lack that Ampullae of Lorenzini organ do not display aversive behavior in close proximity to the magnetic field, making this technology selective.

When a shark swims through the Earth's magnetic field, electromagnetic induction – a phenomenon which generates voltage in an electrical conductor moving through a magnetic field – creates an electric field around the shark. Minute differences in the Earth's magnetic field at different locations result in minute differences in the induced electric field which may be detected by the shark's sensitive electroreceptors, especially as the head region moves back and forth during swimming (Lohmann and Johnsen 2000).

== Recent findings ==
In 1995 researchers found that sharks have a heightened sensitivity to low frequency electrical fields, at a close range. This helped with the development of technologies like SharkShield, which is a product that is used for various water-sport activities (such as surfing) that emits a 3D electronic field that surrounds person who is using it. The closer a shark is to the SharkShield, the more likely the shark is to turn away in discomfort.

In 2008, the Department of Primary Industries and Fisheries (DPI&F) and James Cook University, Australia, reported success with permanent magnets in captive studies with grey reef sharks, hammerheads, sharp-nosed sharks, blacktip sharks, sawfish and the critically endangered speartooth shark.

In 2011, the first test of a permanent magnet repellent on a Great White shark was successfully conducted in South Africa with Chris Fallows and Craig O'Connell (SharkDefense). The test was successful, with the shark flinching despite feeding stimulus present, and was featured on Great White Invasion on Discovery Channel's Shark Week.

In 2018 independent tests were carried out on five Shark Repellent technologies using Great white sharks. Only Shark Shield's Ocean Guardian Freedom+ Surf showed measureable results, with encounters reduced from 96% to 40%. SharkBanz bracelet & SharkBanz surf leash, which utilises magnetic shark repellent technology, showed no measureable effect on reducing shark attacks. The study was undertaken in an oceanic setting and attracted sharks to the research vessels with berley.

In 2021, a study was done to test the effectiveness of magnets as repellant for sand tiger sharks compared to pulsed magnetic fields (PMFs). Researchers' used a variety of foods to attract sharks. When participants brought the magnet, there were no observed changes in the sharks' behaviors. However, when PMFs were introduced, they affected shark behavior both near (<2m) and far (>2m).

== Publications ==
O'Connell, C.P., D.C. Abel, and E.M. Stroud. 2011. Analysis of permanent magnets as elasmobranch bycatch reduction devices in hook-and-line and longline trials. Fish. Bull. 109(4): 394–401.

O'Connell, C.P., S.H. Gruber, D.C. Abel, E.M. Stroud. and P.H. Rice. 2011. The responses of juvenile lemon sharks, Negaprion brevirostris, to a magnetic barrier. Ocean Coast. Manag. 54(3): 225–230.

O'Connell, C.P., Abel, D.C., Rice, P.H., Stroud, E.M. and Simuro, N.C. 2010. Responses of the Southern Stingray (Dasyatis americana) and the Nurse Shark (Ginglymostoma cirratum) to Permanent Magnets. Mar. Freshw. Behav. Phy. 43: 63–73.

O'Connell, C.P. 2008. Investigation of Grade C8 Barium Ferrite (BaFe2O4) Permanent Magnets as a Possible Elasmobranch Bycatch Reduction System. In: Swimmer, Y., J.H. Wang, and L. McNaughton. 2008. Shark deterrent and incidental capture workshop, April 10–11, 2008. U.S. Dep. Commer., NOAA Tech Memo., NOAA-TM-NMFS-PIFSC-16. 72p.

OTHER REFERENCES

Kalmijn A.J., 1971 The Electric Sense of Sharks and Rays. Journal of Experimental Biology 55, 371–383

Kalmijn A.J., 1982 Electric and magnetic field detection in elasmobranch fishes. Science, Vol. 218, Issue 4575, 916–918

Klimley, A. P. 1993. Highly directional swimming by scalloped hammerhead sharks, Sphyrna lewini, and subsurface irradiance, temperature, bathymetry, and geomagnetic field. Marine Biology. 117, 1–22.

Klimley, A. P., S. C. Beavers, T. H. Curtis, and S. J. Jorgensen. 2002. Movements and swimming behavior of three species of sharks in La Jolla Canyon, California. Environmental Biology of Fishes. 63, 117–135.

== See also ==
- Electropositive shark repellent
