= Jessica Meeuwig =

Director of the Centre for Marine Futures at the University of Western Australia

- Education: McGill University, Montreal, Quebec, Canada
- Known for: Campaigning for Marine Conservation
- Awards: Conservation Fellow of the Zoological Society of London (appointed 2012)
- Scientific career
- Fields: Marine Science
- Workplaces: University of Western Australia

Professor Jessica Meeuwig is the inaugural director of the Centre for Marine Futures at the University of Western Australia (UWA). In 2012 she was appointed as a Conservation Fellow of the Zoological Society of London and was also named as one of the 100 most influential people in Western Australia by The West Australian newspaper.

== Career ==
After being awarded a PhD with Distinction by McGill University, Meeuwig became deputy director of the conservation organisation Project Seahorse. She worked in south east Asia on the science and management of reef fisheries, including the application of novel statistical approaches to understanding catch and effort data. On moving to Perth, Meeuwig worked for the WA Department of Environment and Conservation and the Australian Department of the Environment, Water, Heritage and the Arts in policy and planning positions. At UWA, she worked on the "Marine Futures" project prior to being appointed as inaugural director of the new Centre for Marine Futures.

=== Research ===
Meeuwig's PhD research was on the subject of statistical modelling of aquatic ecosystems. She now focuses on how marine fish communities are affected for good or ill by human activities, such as resource extraction or protection. Her research projects include investigating the displacement of humpback whales as a result of coastal development, researching how sharks and fish use underwater banks and canyons, and how marine sanctuaries generate ecological and economic benefits.

== Environmental campaigns ==
Meeuwig is well known in Western Australia for her campaigning to protect the marine environment. She is a strong advocate for the creation of marine parks in Western Australia, an idea opposed by the WA state government.

=== Opposition to Western Australian shark cull ===
In response to the deaths of 7 swimmers attacked by sharks between 2010 and 2013, the government of Western Australia implemented a shark culling scheme in 2014 – a policy which generated considerable controversy in WA. Meeuwig made a submission opposing the scheme to the State Environmental Protection Agency, backed by 300 of the world's leading marine scientists. She has analysed the data from a similar scheme in Queensland and found no statistical evidence that it has proved effective in reducing deaths from shark attacks.

== Awards and recognition ==
- 2009 WA Coastal Award for Excellence in Marine Science and Education (team award)
- Conservation Fellow of the Zoological Society of London (appointed 2012)
- 2012 Finalist, WA Science Ambassador of the Year

== Select publications and bibliography ==
- D. L. Saunders; J. J. Meeuwig; A. C. J. Vincent (2002). "Freshwater Protected Areas: Strategies for Conservation". Conservation Biology. 16 (1): 30–41. doi:10.1046/j.1523-1739.2002.99562.x. PMID 35701954. Wikidata Q55845483.
- John E. Fa; Peres, Carlos; Meeuwig, Jessica Jane (2002). "Bushmeat Exploitation in Tropical Forests: an Intercontinental Comparison". Conservation Biology. 16 (1): 232–237. doi:10.1046/j.1523-1739.2002.00275.x. PMID 35701970. Wikidata Q57035134.
- Bushmeat and food security in the Congo Basin: linkages between wildlife and people's future. JE Fa, D Currie, J Meeuwig. Environmental Conservation 30 (01), 71-78
- Biology of a seahorse species, Hippocampus comes in the central Philippines. NC Perante, MG Pajaro, JJ Meeuwig, ACJ Vincent. Journal of Fish Biology 60 (4), 821-837
