= Ocean Guardian =

Personal electromagnetic field shark deterrent device

Ocean Guardian Holdings Limited
- Formerly: SeaChange Technology (Shark Shield)
- Type: Private
- Industry: Shark deterrents
- Founded: 2001
- Defunct: 2024
- Fate: Liquidated
- Headquarters: Warriewood, NSW, Australia, Australia
- Area served: Worldwide
- Key people: Lindsay Lyon (CEO)
- Products: Electrical shark deterrents
- Website: ocean-guardian.com

Ocean Guardian was the manufacturer of Shark Shield shark repellent devices. The Ocean Guardian electronic devices create an electromagnetic field to deter shark attacks and are used by surfers, scuba divers, snorkelers, spearfishers, ocean kayak fishers, swimming areas off boats and for ocean fishing. It is considered one of the few electrical devices on the market that has performed independent trials to determine its effectiveness at deterring shark attacks, Whilst it is noted the Shark Shield technology does not work in all situations, modelling research from Flinders University in 2021 indicated that the proper use of personal electronic deterrents is an effective way to prevent future deaths and injuries, and estimated that these devices could save up to 1,063 Australian lives along the coastline over 50 years. Following Insolvency and Liquidity issues Ocean Guardian collapsed in 2024.

== History ==
The original waveform used in the shark repelling technology was devised by three inventors, Graeme Charter, Sherman Ripley, and Norman Starkey, and released in 1995 by POD Holdings Ltd, a joint venture company partly owned by the Natal Sharks Board and the South African government.

In the late 1990s the KwaZulu-Natal Sharks Board developed the first electrical shark deterrent, the SharkPOD (protective oceanic device or simply POD). In 2001, the KwaZulu-Natal Sharks Board ceased distribution of the SharkPOD. All rights to the intellectual property were licensed to a South Australian-based company, SeaChange Technology Holdings, which developed various new application patents resulting in a commercial product line under the brand name Shark Shield in April 2002.

In 2007, the company introduced the third generation of products to replace the original FREEDOM4 and DIVE01, expanding the range of products offered to include the SCUBA7 (replaced the DIVE01) and introducing two new designs: the FREEDOM7 (replaced the FREEDOM4), a versatile option that can be used by a broad range of ocean-users, including scuba divers, spearfishers, boaters, and kayakers; and the SURF7, designed to be fitted onto a surfboard or stand-up paddleboard to offer surfers protection from sharks.

The Shark Shield technology was further developed by the Australian company SeaChange Technology Holdings Pty Ltd, and commercialized by its trading company Shark Shield Pty Ltd established in October 2006. SeaChange Technology Holdings Pty Ltd changed its name to Ocean Guardian Holdings Limited in 2018 with Shark Shield Pty Ltd trading as Ocean Guardian.

In 2016, with research and development funding from the Western Australian government, Ocean Guardian announced the FREEDOM+ Surf a product designed in partnership with two times World Champion surfer Tom Carroll specifically designed for surfers. The new design removed the trailing antenna of the older SURF7 being replaced with a sticker-thin antenna on the underside of the surfboard, with the fully transferable power module located in the kicker of the tail pad.

In January 2019 the company announced the world's first handheld electrical shark deterrent based on Shark Shield technology called the eSPEAR. The eSPEAR is designed primarily for spearfishermen, divers and snorkelers. The Ocean Guardian product line was further expanded to include the BOAT01 to create a safe swimming area around vessels, and the FISH01 to assist ocean fishermen land their catch without being taken by sharks.

On May 26, 2017 the Western Australian government implemented a $200 consumer rebate for scientifically proven electrical shark deterrents. The Ocean Guardian FREEDOM7 and FREEDOM+ Surf are the only products approved.

In addition to traditional ocean sports, Ocean Guardian products are in use with various government bodies including police and navies, and were used by production members in the filming of both The Shallows and USS Indianapolis: Men of Courage. Long-distance swimmer, Diana Nyad, in her swim crossing from Cuba to Florida without a cage, used Shark Shield.

In May 2024 Ocean Guardian was placed in Administration and in September 2024 the Company was Liquidated.

== Functionality ==
All chondrichthyans have highly sensitive electrical receptors called the "ampullae of Lorenzini" located in their snouts. These tiny gel-filled sacs sense electric current from prey at very close distances, typically less than one meter. The jelly is highly conductive and allows the electrical potential at the opening of the pore to be transferred to the ampulla. They use these short-range sensors when feeding or searching for food. They do not use electrical receptors to track animate objects over long distances; other senses such as audition and olfaction are the primary drivers.

Ocean Guardian devices create an electrical field that creates an unpleasant sensation impacting the shark's ampullae of Lorenzini. When the shark comes into the range of the field, it experiences uncontrollable muscular spasms, causing it to flee the area.

The field is projected from two electrodes, which create an elliptical field that surrounds the user. Both electrodes must be immersed in the water for the field to be created. Research conducted by the South African National Space Agency in 2012 estimated the Shark Shield electrical field to be about 4–5 m in diameter.

While sharks are attracted to electromagnetic pulses produced by potential prey animals, the electronic field emitted by the Shark Shield does not attract sharks to the device, so would not increase the risk of attracting sharks to the vicinity of the user. A shark's sensory organs are acutely sensitive to low-voltage gradients (> 5 nVcm), enabling them to detect very low-frequency electronic fields between 1 and 8 Hz at short range, after which the other senses (sight, chemoreception, and mechanoreception) aid the shark in capturing its prey. The range at which an electronic shark deterrent emits a field that is the equivalent of a prey-like stimulus (about 1–100 nV/cm) is much further than their short-range detection facilitates. Should a shark approach the device, the strength of the electric field gets stronger the closer it gets, and soon causes the shark extreme discomfort, forcing it to turn away. Scientific studies modelling this effect show that the output produced at a 3-m distance is far greater than that produced by prey, and drops off significantly beyond a 6-m radius, where it is beyond the short-range detection ability of a shark.

== Testing and research ==
The original "SharkPOD" was tested for eight years off Dyer Island with mainly great white sharks (Carcharodon carcharias), and was the first electronic device that was proven successful in deterring sharks when tested by Ron Taylor and Valerie Taylor in 1997 against great white sharks, tiger sharks, hammerhead sharks, and other shark species in Australia and South Africa with positive results; they made a documentary about it called "Shark POD".

In 2003, C F Smit, Department of Statistics, University of Pretoria, South Africa and V Peddemors, Department of Zoology, University of Durban-Westville, South Africa (Peddemors was employed by the Natal Sharks Board at the time) researched "Estimating the Probability of a Shark Attack when using an Electric Repellent". In two series of tests of the SharkPOD, data were collected on the time needed to attack the bait, under power-off and power-on (active) conditions. Conclusions were separately drawn after completion of the first experiment (in which 8 attacks were successful in 98 five-minute active periods), and after completion of the second experiment (in which no successful attacks were recorded in 24 ten-minute active periods). In general, the probability of an attack in at most 5 minutes was reduced from about 0.70 in power-off mode to about 0.08 in power-on mode and in a period of at most 10 minutes from 0.90 to 0.16.

In 2010, SafeWork South Australia, the government agency responsible for administering occupational health, safety, and welfare laws in South Australia, commissioned the South Australian Research and Development Institute to conduct a study into the effectiveness of the Shark Shield FREEDOM7 product. The research team conducted field experiments testing great white shark response to both a static bait (natural prey) and a dynamically towed seal decoy at Neptune Islands, South Australia, and Seal Island, South Africa, respectively, documenting their findings in a research report titled: "Effects of the Shark Shield electric deterrent on the behaviour of great white sharks (Carcharodon carcharias)". A total of 116 trials using a static bait were undertaken at the Neptune Islands, South Australia, and 189 tows were conducted using a seal decoy near Seal Island, South Africa. The proportion of baits taken during static bait trials was not affected by the deterrent. The deterrent increased the time it took to take a static bait, and the number of interactions per approach. The effect of the Shark ShieldTM was not uniform across all sharks. The number of interactions within 2 m of the deterrent decreased when it was activated. No breaches and only two surface interactions were observed during the dynamic seal decoy tows when the deterrent was activated, compared to 16 breaches and 27 surface interactions when the deterrent was not activated. Although the fine-scale positioning and presence/absence data collected to assess the potential of the device to attract great white sharks was limited to one trip, their results did not suggest that sharks were attracted to the deterrent. The deterrent had an effect on the behaviour of great white sharks, but did not deter or repel them in all situations.

In July 2016, shark researchers from the Neuroecology Group at the University of Western Australia had published a study into the effectiveness of the Shark Shield shark deterrent on PLOS ONE "How Close is too Close? The Effect of a Non-Lethal Electric Shark Deterrent on White Shark Behaviour". The research team was funded by the Western Australian government and included UWA Oceans Institute Director Professor Shaun Collin, Associate Professor Nathan Hart and Dr Ryan Kempster. Using a modified stereo-camera system, the research quantified behavioral interactions between great white sharks (Carcharodon carcharias) and a baited target in the presence of a commercially available, personal electric shark deterrent (Shark Shield Freedom7). The stereo-camera system enabled an assessment of the behavioral responses of C. carcharias when encountering a non-lethal electric field many times stronger than what they would naturally experience. Upon their first observed encounter, all C. carcharias were repelled at a mean (± std. error) proximity of 131 (± 10.3) cm, which corresponded to a mean voltage gradient of 9.7 (± 0.9) V/m. With each subsequent encounter, their proximity decreased by an average of 11.6 cm, which corresponded to an increase in tolerance to the electric field by an average of 2.6 (± 0.5) V/m per encounter. Despite the increase in tolerance, sharks continued to be deterred from interacting for the duration of each trial in the presence of an active Shark Shield. Furthermore, the findings provide no support to the theory that electric deterrents attract sharks. The results of this study provide quantitative evidence of the effectiveness of a non-lethal electric shark deterrent, its influence on the behaviour of C. carcharias, and an accurate method for testing other shark deterrent technologies.

In reviewing the 2016 University of Western Australia research, the Australian Geographic magazine published an article titled "Great White Shark Deterrent almost 100 Per Cent Effective".

In 2016, a study conducted by the Australian consumer advocacy group Choice found that Ocean Guardian (Shark Shield) was the only independently tested shark repellent to be effective.

In 2018 the New South Wales state government funded research conducted by Flinders University to test the effectiveness of five personal shark deterrents for surfers. Flinders tested five personal shark deterrents developed for surfers Ocean Guardian FREEDOM+ Surf, Rpela, SharkBanz bracelet, SharkBanz surf leash, and Chillax Wax) by comparing the percentage of baits taken, distance to the bait, number of passes, and whether a shark reaction could be observed. There were a total of 297 successful trials at the Neptune Islands Group Marine Park in South Australia, during which 44 different great white sharks (Carcharodon carcharias) interacted with the bait, making a total of 1413 passes. The effectiveness of the deterrents was variable, with the FREEDOM+ Surf affecting shark behaviour the most and reducing the percentage of bait taken from 96% (relative to the control board) to 40%. The mean distance of sharks to the board increased from 1.6 ± 0.1 m (control board) to 2.6 ± 0.1 m when the FREEDOM Surf+ was active. The other deterrents had limited or no measurable effect on great white shark behaviour. Based on the power analyses, the smallest effect size that could be reliably detected was ~15%, which for the first time provides information about the effect size that a deterrent study can reliably detect.

== Shark attacks involving Shark Shield products ==
There have been three known fatalities involving Shark Shield technology; Paul Buckland (2002), Peter Clarkson (2011) and Garry Johnson (2020).

Paul Buckland was wearing the Shark POD device which was the first version of the product developed in South Africa. The coroner concluded that the device was incorrectly worn and made the following recommendation; "I therefore recommend, pursuant to Section 25(2) of the Coroners Act, that commercial and recreational divers, when operating in waters where there is a risk of the presence of sharks, should wear a shark repellent device of the 'Shark Pod' or 'Shark Shield' type, provided that the equipment should be used in accordance with the manufacturer's instructions, and should be turned on for the entire duration of time in the water."

Peter Clarkson always wore a shark shield, which was confirmed by the presence of small floats from the tail of the device on the surface of water after the attack. In the coroners findings the main reference to Shark Shield was: "Mr. Clarkson always wore a Shark Shield which he attached to his belt. It is a battery operated device which can be switched on and off and is designed to repel any sharks as they approach. Mr. Rodd said that sometimes Mr. Clarkson would turn the Shark Shield off when he was on the bottom but most of the time he would switch it on when he entered the water and then switch it off again when he got to the surface. Mr. Rodd did not know whether Mr Clarkson had the Shark Shield turned on at the time of the incident that occurred on 17 February 2011."

Garry Johnson was wearing a FREEDOM7 device at the time of the shark attack. It is likely that the device was temporary turned off to reduce the risk of a shock whilst Johnson was securing a line to a rock on the sea floor. In the brief moments around this time when the device was turned off, Johnson was attacked and killed by a great white shark.

== Company collapse ==
In May 2024 Ocean Guardian entered Administration following losses for the previous four financial years that resulted in liquidity and solvency issues. The company was also unsuccessful at raising additional capital via a stock exchange listing, or by an investment by a high net worth individual. In September 2024 the creditors of the Company voted to wind up Ocean Guardian and place it into liquidation. The IP of the business was sold to US Investors, who advised that they were planning to manufacture the dive and surf line of Shark Shield products.

== See also ==
- Outline of sharks
- Shark attack
- Shark attack prevention
- Shark repellent
- Shark net
- Shark barrier
- Shark proof cage
