= Electropositive shark repellent =

Electropositive metals (EPMs) are a new class of shark repellent materials that produce a measurable voltage when immersed in an electrolyte such as seawater. The voltages produced are as high as 1.75 VDC in seawater. It is hypothesized that this voltage overwhelms the ampullary organ in sharks, producing a repellent action. Since bony fish lack the ampullary organ, the repellent is selective to sharks and rays. The process is electrochemical, so no external power input is required. As chemical work is done, the metal is lost in the form of corrosion. Depending on the alloy or metal utilized and its thickness, the electropositive repellent effect lasts up to 48 hours. The reaction of the electropositive metal in seawater produces hydrogen gas bubbles and an insoluble nontoxic hydroxide as a precipitate which settles downward in the water column.

== History ==
SharkDefense made the discovery of electrochemical shark repellent effects on May 1, 2006 at South Bimini, Bahamas at the Bimini Biological Field Station. An electropositive metal, which was a component of a permanent magnet, was chosen as an experimental control for a tonic immobility experiment by Eric Stroud using a juvenile lemon shark (Negaprion brevirostris). It was anticipated that this metal would produce no effect, since it was not ferromagnetic. However, a violent rousing response was observed when the metal was brought within 50 cm of the shark's nose. The experiment was repeated with three other juvenile lemon sharks and two other juvenile nurse sharks (Ginglymostoma cirratum), and care was taken to eliminate all stray metal objects in the testing site. Patrick Rice, Michael Herrmann, and Eric Stroud were present at this first trial. Mike Rowe, from Discovery Channel’s Dirty Jobs series, subsequently witnessed and participated in a test using an electropositive metal within 24 hours after the discovery.

In the next three months, a variety of transition metals, lanthanides, post-transition metals, metalloids, and non-metal samples were screened for rousing activity using the tonic immobility bioassay in juvenile lemon sharks and juvenile nurse sharks. All behaviors were scored from 0 to 4 depending on the response. It was determined that Group I, II, III, and Lanthanide metals all produced rousing responses, but the average score generally increased with electropositivity.

Further testing using salt bridge electrochemical cells were conducted during 2006 and 2007 at the Oak Ridge Shark Lab. Using seawater as the electrolyte and a shark fin clipping as the cathode, voltages measured closely correlated with the standard reduction potential of the metal under test. SharkDefense now hypothesizes that a net positive charge from the cations produced by the electropositive metals accumulate on the electronegative skin of the shark. The net increase of the charge on the shark's skin is perceived by the ampullae of Lorenzini, and above 1.2 eV potential, aversion is produced.

Electropositive metals are reducing agents and liberate hydrogen gas in seawater via hydrolysis, producing a half-cell voltage of about −0.86 eV. Simultaneously, an insoluble metal hydroxide precipitate is produced, which is inert for shark repellent activity. As such, metal is lost to corrosion in the process of generating cations. SharkDefense conducted corrosion loss studies in 2008 at South Bimini, Bahamas, and found that a 70 gram piece of a custom electropositive alloy retained more than 50% of its original weight after 70 hours of immersion. Losses due to corrosion are heavily a function of temperature, therefore, the cold seawater at fishing depths serves to reduce the corrosion rate.

== Research and testing ==
Stoner and Kaimmer (2008) reported success using cerium mischmetal and Pacific spiny dogfish (Squalus acanthias, a type of shark) in captivity, both with tonic immobility and feeding preference tests. Lead metal was used as a control. Encouraged by the results, a longline study was conducted off Homer, Alaska in late 2007 with the cooperation of the International Pacific Halibut Commission. Again, lead was used as a control. This study found a 17% reduction in Pacific spiny dogfish catch, and a 48% reduction in clearnose skate catch.

However, Tallack et al. reported that cerium mischmetal was entirely ineffective against Atlantic spiny dogfish in the Gulf of Maine. Mandelman et al. reported that the repellent effect disappeared after starvation using captive Atlantic spiny dogfish, and that a species-specific variation in response to the mischmetals exist between captive Atlantic spiny dogfish and dusky smoothhounds (Mustelis canis).

Stroud (SharkDefense, 2006) and Fisher (VIMS) observed captive cownose rays (Rhinoptera bonasus) changing swim elevation and ignoring blue crab baits in cages that contained neodymium-praseodymium mischmetal. The position of the treatment cages were alternated, and all cages were placed in the swim path of the rays.

Brill et al. (2008) reported that captive juvenile sandbar sharks (Carcharhinus plumbeus) maintained a 50–60 cm clearance in their swimming patterns when a piece of neodymium-praseodymium mischmetal was placed in the tank.

Wang, Swimmer, and Laughton (2007) reported aversive responses to neodymium-praseodymium mischmetals placed near baits offered to adult Galapagos (C. galapagensis) and Sandbar sharks on bamboo poles in Hawaii. In July 2008 Richard Brill of NMFS/VIMS and SharkDefense both conducted more at-sea trials with electropositive metals in an effort to reduce shark bycatch in commercial fisheries. As of August 2, 2008, Brill reported nearly a 3:1 reduction in sandbar shark catch when plastic decoys were compared to metals. A high statistical significance was obtained, as reported in the Virginian-Pilot by Joanne Kimberlin. SharkDefense later developed a simple on-hook treatment and a bait attachment which were being tested on Atlantic longlining vessels in 2008.

Favaro and Cole (2013) determined through meta-analysis that electropositive metals did not reduce elasmobranch by-catch in commercial long-line fisheries, which raises concerns on the effectiveness of this approach as a shark deterrent or repellent to protect water users.

== Selectivity ==
As expected, teleosts (bony fish) are not repelled by the electropositive metal's cation liberation in seawater. This is because teleosts lack the ampullae of Lorenzini. Teleost response was confirmed using captive Cobia (Rachycentron canadum) and Pacific halibut (Hippoglossus stenolepis). In July 2008 swordfish (Xiphias gladius) catch was reported on experimental hooks treated with electropositive metal.

== Limitations ==
As with all shark repellents, 100% effectiveness will not be achieved with electropositive metals. The metals are particularly effective when the shark is relying on its electrosense. It is likely that electropositive metals are ineffective for deliberately stimulated (chummed) sharks, competitively feeding sharks, and shark "frenzies". The metals are very useful in the environment of commercial fisheries, and possibly recreational and artisanal fisheries.
