= Drum line (shark control) =

Aquatic trap to capture dangerous sharks

A drum line is an unmanned aquatic trap used to lure and capture large sharks using baited hooks. They are typically deployed near popular swimming beaches with the intention of reducing the number of sharks in the vicinity and therefore the probability of shark attack. Drum lines are often used in association with shark nets, which results in shark mortality. However SMART drum lines can be used to move sharks, which greatly reduces shark and bycatch mortality. The use of drum lines has been successful in reducing shark attacks in the areas where they are installed. The topic of shark culling became an international controversy and sparked public demonstrations and vocal opposition, particularly from environmentalists, animal welfare advocates and ocean activists.

== Description ==
The drum line consists of a floating drum (a barrel) with two lines attached to it. One line is attached to an anchor on the sea floor, while the other features a large baited shark hook. The drum is filled with a rigid polyurethane foam, which keeps it buoyant and prevents it from being stolen for use as a storage vessel. To attract sharks, the hooks are baited with red mullet and false jacopever. Since the objective of the drum line is to prevent sharks from approaching popular beaches (and not to attract them) only about 500 grams of bait is added to each hook. Thus only sharks from the immediate vicinity are attracted to the baits.

== History ==
Drum lines were deployed to prevent shark attacks in Queensland, Australia in 1962. They continue to be used in Queensland and continue to capture sharks (and also capture by-catch species such as dolphins). They were then used by KwaZulu-Natal (South Africa), and continue to be used there. They were used intermittently in Western Australia in an "imminent threat" policy, having previously been used there for 4 months in 2014. The use of drum lines in Western Australia ceased in March 2017 following a change in the state government. From January 2019 "SMART" drum lines were deployed off the Western Australian coast, however the trial ended in 2021. Since 2014 Réunion Island has used drum lines in conjunction with long lines and shark barriers.

== Advantages ==
Permanent or semipermanent deployment of shark-fishing gear off high-use beaches (which includes drum lines) has been successful in reducing the incidence of shark attack at protected beaches. While shark nets and drum lines share the same purpose, drum lines are more effective at targeting the three sharks that are considered most dangerous to swimmers: the bull shark, tiger shark and great white shark. Drum lines physically attract sharks from within the immediate vicinity using bait while shark nets allow the sharks to swim over or around them. Additionally, the bycatch, or unintended catch, of drum lines is considerably less than that of shark nets.

SMART drumlines can also be utilised to move sharks, which greatly reduces mortality of sharks and bycatch. In the New South Wales North Coast SMART drumline trial (Australia) 99% of targeted sharks and 98% of other animals caught were released alive.

Drum lines and long lines have also been used with great success in Recife, Brazil where the shark attack rate dropped by 97%. The purpose of the program was to relocate sharks 8 kilometres from beaches.

== Disadvantages ==
Recife, Brazil data, October 2007 to December 2011
Common name	Total caught	% released alive
Spotted eagle ray	4	100%
Marine catfish	244	75%
Blacknose shark	26	12%
Silky shark	2	50%
Bull shark	4	50%
Blacktip shark	3	33%
Caribbean reef shark	1	0%
Marine turtles	4	100%
Barred grunt	3	67%
Sting rays	14	93%
Atlantic goliath grouper	13	100%
Tiger shark	34	82%
Nurse shark	130	99%
Moray eels	11	18%
Snappers	6	67%
Devil rays	6	50%
Brazilian sharpnose shark	1	0%
Total:	506	77%

Drum lines can result in the death of sharks and bycatch. During a shark attack mitigation program off Recife, Brazil over a 4-year period (October 2007 to December 2011) the total sharks caught, as well as bycatch and the percentage released alive is shown in the table.

During the same period in Recife, 44 potentially aggressive sharks were also hooked, including 34 tiger sharks and 4 bull sharks. The overall survival rate of potentially aggressive sharks was 70% (relocated and released). Out of all the animals caught, 22.7% of them died. Unlike in Queensland, the objective of the Recife program was to relocate potentially aggressive sharks.

The combination of drum lines and shark nets does not directly lead to extinction, but they also may not give the population room to recover from being endangered of extinction.

Using drum lines that results in the death of sharks negatively affects the marine ecosystem. The Australian Marine Conservation Society said, "the ecological cost of drum lines is high, with 97% of sharks caught [in Queensland] since 2001 considered to be at some level of conservation risk." Jessica Morris of Humane Society International says, "sharks are top order predators that play an important role in the functioning of marine ecosystems. We need them for healthy oceans."

Drum lines have been claimed to be an ineffective strategy to keep people safe, while simultaneously resulting in the death of thousands of sharks and other wildlife in the marine ecosystem. Western Australia Fisheries Minister Dave Kelly said "there is currently no scientific evidence to show that drumlines reduce the risk of a [shark] attack". (Note: After Dave Kelly said this, the Western Australian government decided to implement a "SMART" drum line trial; Kelly said in November 2018, "Hopefully at the end of the trial we will get a scientific basis for making an assessment as to whether or not these ['SMART'] drum lines actually make our beaches safer.")

The ongoing shark control program in Queensland has been criticised. This program has been called a cull. From 1962 to the present, the government of Queensland has targeted sharks in large numbers by using drum lines — this program has also led to the death of large numbers of other animals such as dolphins; it has also resulted in the mortality of endangered hammerhead sharks. Queensland currently operates the largest shark culling program in Australia. In the first 11 months of 2013, 633 sharks were captured in Queensland — more than 95% of those sharks died. From 2013 to 2014, 667 sharks died in Queensland's "shark control" program, including great white sharks and critically endangered grey nurse sharks. From 2014 to 2015, 621 sharks died in Queensland. From 2017 to 2018, 218 sharks were killed, including 75 tiger sharks and 41 bull sharks. From 2001 to 2018, a total of 10,480 sharks died on drum lines in Queensland.

In 2015, the following was said about bycatch in Queensland's "shark control" program (which uses drum lines):

[Data] reveals the ecological carnage of [Queensland's] shark control regime. In total, more than 8,000 marine species with some level of protection status have been caught by the Queensland Shark Control Program, including 719 loggerhead turtles, 442 manta rays and 33 critically endangered hawksbill turtles. More than 84,000 marine animals have been ensnared by drum-lines and shark nets since the program began in 1962 [...] Nearly 27,000 marine mammals have been snared. The state’s shark control policy has captured over 5,000 turtles, 1,014 dolphins, nearly 700 dugongs and 120 whales, all of which are federally protected marine species.

Shark and bycatch mortality from drum lines is minor compared to Commercial fishing. On average 15 Great white sharks are caught by the NSW and Queensland shark control programme each year, compared to 186 caught in Australia from other activities. Australia's commercial shark fishing industry is catching over 1200 tonne of shark each year, of which 130 are Great white sharks. The NSW prawn trawling industry alone results in 64 tonne of shark as bycatch each year, with two thirds dying. Tuna and swordfish longline fishing off the coast of South Africa reported 39,000 to 43,000 sharks died each year between 1995 and 2005. Sharksavers estimates that in total 50 million sharks are caught unintentionally each year as bycatch by the commercial fishing industry.

There is also evidence of dolphins stealing bait on numerous occasions, thus rendering the drum lines useless.

== Smart drumlines ==
On Réunion regular operation of "SMART" (Shark-Management-Alert-in-Real-Time) drum lines began in August 2015 and they are used in conjunction with bottom long lines. A "SMART" drum line is based on the traditional drum line design, but it includes technology that can alert rangers to the capture of marine life, who can then attend the device if sea conditions permit. In Reunion, fishermen usually attend the drum lines within 90 minutes of an alert and 90 per cent of animals caught on the hooks survive. There are now around 15 of these smart-drumlines along the coast of Réunion Island.

Since December 2015 the New South Wales State government commenced trials of "SMART" drumlines, as part of an expansion of shark attack mitigation strategies along the New South Wales North coast. Twenty five drumlines were deployed at Ballina and Evans Head beaches (15 off Ballina; 10 off Evans Head). Once a target shark is caught it is tagged with a transmitter, relocated approximately 1 km offshore and released. Non-targeted animals are immediately released. In addition, the tagged sharks provide an alert to the community if they pass within range of a series of listening stations located along the coast. Since the start of the trial 230 target sharks (209 great white, 12 tiger, and 9 bull sharks) were caught with 99% of targeted sharks and 98% of other animals released alive. The trial has been effective in reducing shark attacks and has been expanded to other regions of New South Wales. As of 2022, the New South Wales government states that its SMART drumlines are set daily 500 metres offshore and in water between 8 and 15 metres deep. They are returned to shore at night. If an animal is detected taking the bait, the signal is responded to within 30 minutes.

In August 2018 a 12-month trial of "SMART" drumlines along Western Australia's South West coast, near Gracetown was announced.

Environmental groups oppose "SMART" drum lines; they say that "SMART" drum lines will not reduce the risk of shark attacks, and may actually make beaches more dangerous; they also say "SMART" drum lines are dangerous to sharks. In 2018, more than 7,000 Western Australians signed a petition demanding that Western Australia's "SMART" drum line trial be abandoned. Humane Society International stated the following about "SMART" drum lines in Western Australia: "HSI expects the SMART drumline trial to result in the inevitable suffering and death of marine wildlife, and therefore opposes the decision to commence the trial." Tooni Mahto, a spokesman for the Australian Marine Conservation Society, said the following about "SMART" drum lines: "Some species can't cope with being released after being caught [on "SMART" drum lines]. For example hammerhead sharks, when caught on hooks get very, very stressed."

On the 17 January 2019 the Environmental Protection Authority of Western Australia determined that the "SMART" drumline trial would have minimal impact on the environment and therefore did not warrant a formal assessment.

== Controversy ==
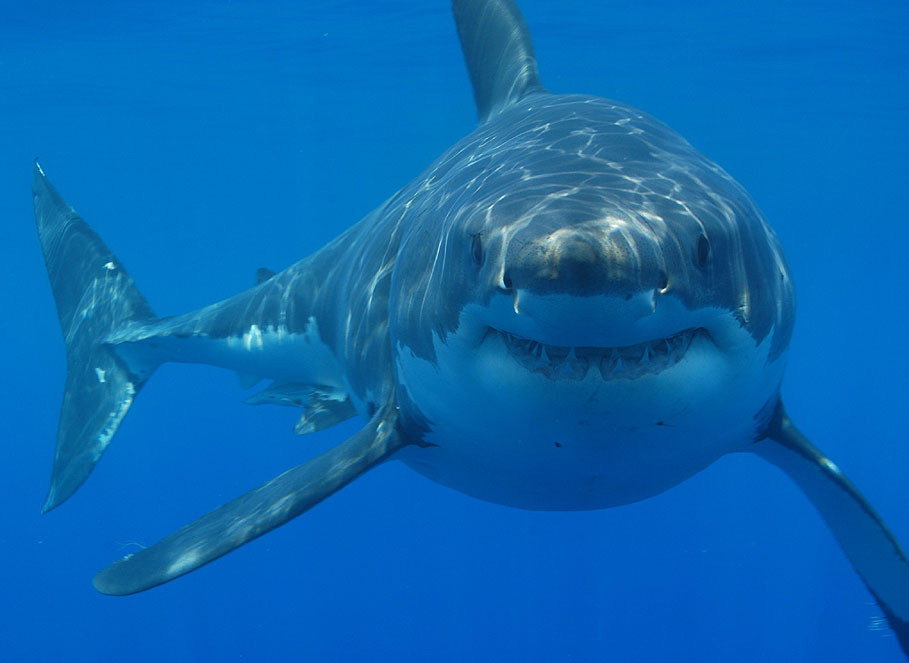
Great white sharks were targeted by Western Australia's controversial shark culling policy.

Prior to 2014, drum lines were only utilised on Australia's eastern coast and in South Africa where the numbers of attacks reduced dramatically. In 2014, the Western Australian government reacted to seven fatal shark attacks in the years 2010-2013 and installed drum lines along around 200 km of its 20,000 km (12,000 mi) long coastline (around 1%). The policy has been the subject of national and international protests, coming under fire from marine conservationists and animal welfare advocates and their supporters. The policy is commonly referred to as the Western Australian shark cull. Following a change in the West Australian state government in March 2017, the newly elected Premier Mark McGowan and Fisheries Minister David Kelly have stated that they do not support the previous governments' shark plan. However, in August 2018, following continual shark attacks, the West Australian state government reversed their position and announced a 12-month trial of "SMART" drumlines along Western Australia's South West coast, near Gracetown.

Drum lines have been criticised on animal rights grounds, not only for their negative effect on the environment and the mortality of endangered species, but also for their non-scientific and speciesist approach.

A number of people opposed to the Queensland's shark-killing program have sabotaged various drum lines throughout Queensland to save sharks, despite the risk of being fined.

The current shark mitigation program in Queensland has been criticized by environmentalists, conservationists, and animal rights advocates — they say Queensland's shark mitigation program is unethical and harms the marine ecosystem. Queensland's shark mitigation program has been called "outdated, cruel and ineffective". The government of Queensland currently captures sharks in the Great Barrier Reef using 173 drum lines; in 2018, Humane Society International Australia filed a lawsuit (court challenge) requesting that the drum lines be removed there. The case was heard in the Administrative Appeals Tribunal in January 2019, and in April 2019 the Tribunal ordered that sharks no longer be culled in the Great Barrier Reef based on the evidence that capturing sharks makes no difference to swimmer safety. A trial of non-lethal drumlines in the Great Barrier Reef Marine Park is underway.

== See also ==
- Shark attack prevention
- Shark culling
- Shark net
