= Sharkdefense =

SharkDefense is a research organization and think tank focused on shark bycatch reduction. Its core research involves chemical and electrochemical shark repellent technologies. SharkDefense's repellent experiments have been featured extensively in the US and European media.

SharkDefense is the discover of the permanent-magnetic and electrochemical repellent effects on sharks. These findings represent the first research efforts focused exclusively at selectively repelling sharks from commercial fishing gear without affecting the target catch. The repellent effect of electropositive metals on sharks was confirmed by the National Marine Fisheries Service, notably, Stoner and Kaimmer, and studies completed by Brill et al. (2008) and Wang et al. (2008) also support the repellent effects. The preliminary research results on permanent magnetic shark repellents were reviewed, judged, and awarded the first place 2006 WWF SmartGear award. In 2008, the Department of Primary Industries and Fisheries (DPI&F) and James Cook University (JCU), Australia confirmed that permanent (ferrite) magnets technology repel grey reef sharks, hammerheads, sharp-nosed sharks, blacktip sharks, the vulnerable sawfish and the critically endangered spear tooth shark.

In 2014, SharkDefense partnered with SharkTec LLC to commercialize an aerosol semiochemical shark repellent product. Both companies are working to broaden the commercial use of SharkDefense's technologies.

== History ==
SharkDefense was formed in September 2001 by Eric Stroud and Jean Stroud. Its research program began at the Oak Ridge Shark Laboratory with a search for trace chemical messengers present in decayed shark tissue. In 1943, Burden et al. from the Woods Hole Oceanographic Institution (WHOI) had reported that decayed shark tissue was successful at halting feeding in captive dusky smooth-hound sharks (Mustelis canis). In the efforts to develop and test a chemical shark repellent package led by Dr. Harold Coolidge of the Harvard Museum, the WHOI team selected ammonium acetate as the active in the decomposing shark tissue, however, instrumental analysis by the Oak Ridge Shark Lab in 2002 failed to find ammonium acetate. It was hypothesized by SharkDefense that ammonium acetate was an approximation of the ammonium cation (based on the ammonia-like smell of the shark tissue or a urea-urease reaction), and the acetate conjugate base (based on the acetic acid which WHOI had already found to have repellent properties). After 2002, many new compounds were found and catalogued by SharkDefense, who maintains a repellent compound database.

== Milestones ==
1. Apr. 15, 2003 – First successful field test of a semiochemical shark repellent, Triangle Rocks, South Bimini, Bahamas

2. May 2004 – A gustatory shark repellent (“5ISO”) is isolated and successfully tested

3. Nov. 2004 – Accidental discovery of the repellent effects of a rare-earth magnet is made at the Oak Ridge Shark Lab

4. Jul 12, 2005 – Testing at Achotines, Panama on captive yellowfin tuna (T. albacares) confirms that both semiochemical mixtures and the gustation compound are selective shark repellents and do not repel a commercially-valuable fish species.

5. Sep. 15, 2005 - A 0.1ppm solution of a synthetic shark repellent compound terminates tonic immobility in juvenile lemon sharks (N. brevirostris).

6. Nov. 16, 2005 – Chemical repellents are successfully incorporated into a time-release gel matrix, providing more than 4 hours of protection time.

7. May 1, 2006 – Accidental discovery is made using an electropositive metal as an experimental control at South Bimini, Bahamas.

8. May 11, 2006 – SharkDefense is the grand prize winner of the 2006 WWF Smart Gear competition for its proposal on permanent magnet shark repellents.

9. Aug. 31, 2007 - Fish attractant qualities of the gustation compound are confirmed.

10. Jun. 2007 – SMART Hook technology developed.

== Current members ==
2001 – Present. Mr. Eric M. Stroud (Seton Hall University, Ph.D. candidate) was the co-founder of SharkDefense and led the initial research to identify chemical repellent actives. He is the managing partner and is researching chemical signals and necromones as part of his PhD.

2006 – Present. Dr. Patrick H. Rice (University of Miami, RSMAS), partner, joined the SharkDefense team in 2005 while researching the repellent effects of permanent magnets. He is the director of marine sciences at Florida Keys Community College and is senior marine biologist with SharkDefense.

2006 – 2012. Mr. Craig P. O’Connell (Coastal Carolina University, Ph.D. student), partner, joined the SharkDefense team as marine biologist in 2006 while working on a contract shark repellent-sunscreen project at South Bimini, Bahamas. He is researching magnetoreception as a shark bycatch mechanism for his Ph.D.

2010 - 2011. Mr. Conrad Eskelinen (DiveBum Studios), partner, joined the SharkDefense team as creative director in 2010.

2003 – Present. Dr. Samuel H. Gruber (University of Miami, RSMAS, professor emeritus), consultant, has assisted and supervised many SharkDefense repellent trials at the Bimini Biological Field Station.

2003–Present. Mr. Grant T. Johnson (South Bimini, Bahamas), consultant, providing field and testing support.

2004 – Present. Ms. Katie Grudecki (South Bimini, Bahamas), consultant, providing field and testing support.

2004 – 2010. Mr. Sean Williams (Bimini Biological Field Station), consultant, providing field testing support.
