= KwaZulu-Natal Sharks Board =

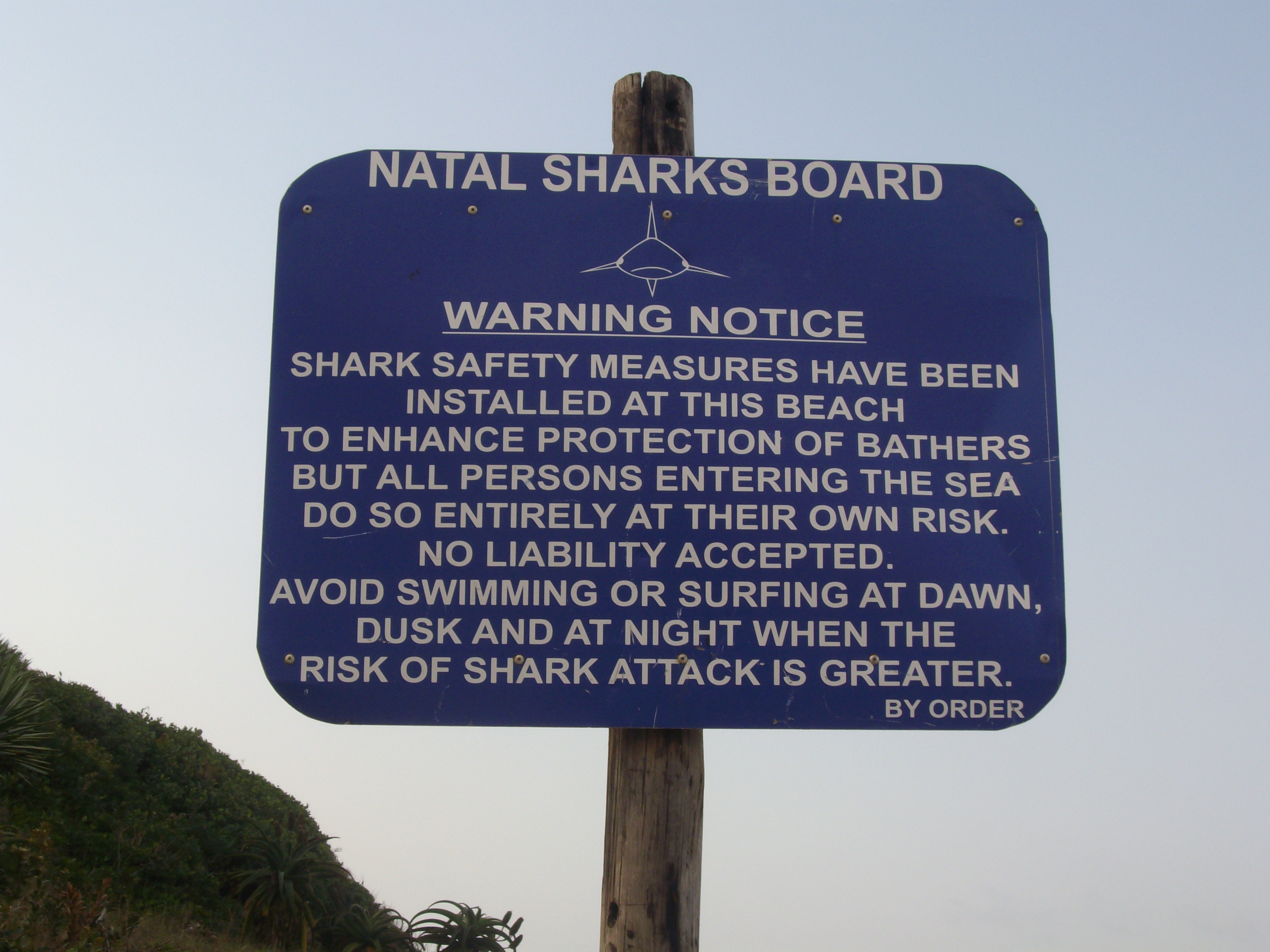
A notice at a beach protected by the Board

The KwaZulu-Natal Sharks Board (KZNSB), previously the Natal Sharks Board and Natal Anti-Shark Measures Board is an organisation that maintains a "shark control" program (using shark nets and drum lines) off the coast of KwaZulu-Natal Province, South Africa, at 37 places. The purpose of the nets and drum lines is to reduce the number of shark attacks. It was founded as a statutory body in 1962, when the city of Durban's netting operations were extended to other parts of the coast in the then Natal Province. It is headquartered in uMhlanga, north of Durban.

The KwaZulu-Natal Sharks Board displays sharks that they have killed as part of shows.

The "shark control" program that the KwaZulu-Natal Sharks Board (KZNSB) operates has been called a shark cull. In a 30-year period, more than 33,000 sharks have been killed in the KZNSB's shark-killing program — during the same 30-year period, 2,211 turtles, 8,448 rays, and 2,310 dolphins were killed. Although shark species such as the great white shark are protected in South Africa, the KZNSB is allowed to kill these sharks (an exception was made for them). The KZNSB has installed shark nets in Marine Protected Areas, and those nets kill animals. The current KZNSB "shark control" program has been criticized by environmentalists, and has been called "archaic" and "disastrous to the ecosystem". Jane Williamson, an associate professor in marine ecology at Macquarie University, says "There is no scientific support for the concept that culling sharks in a particular area will lead to a decrease in shark attacks and increase ocean safety."

== See also ==
- Black December
