= Kayak fishing =

Fishing from a kayak

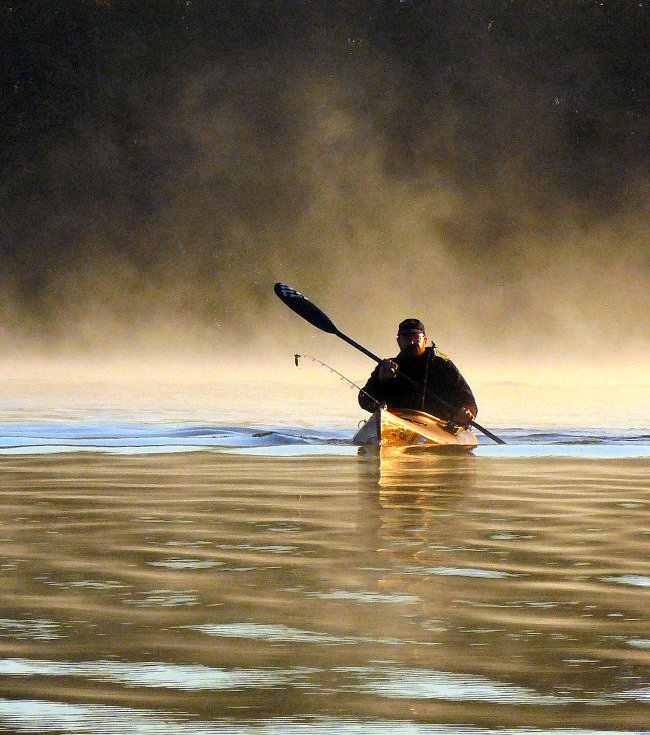
Kayak Fishing at Okmulgee Lake, Oklahoma

Kayak fishing is fishing from a kayak, a type of light human-powered watercraft propelled by handheld double-paddles or pedalled fins/propellers. Recreational rod angling is the predominant form of kayak fishing, although other fishing techniques such as handlining, netting, trapping, spearing, snagging or even shooting can also be used.

Having long been a traditional means of waterborne transport and seal hunting by the Eskaleut indigenous people of North American Arctic and the Bering Sea, kayaks have been adopted by European settlers and gained popularity as a form of lightweight recreational boat fishing in recent times due to its convenience of deployment, agility and versatility in narrow waterways, and small draft that allows access into shallow, snag-prone waters that are typically risky and thus unnavigable to motorboats and yachts.

== History ==
Kayaks (Inuktitut: qajaq, Inuktitut syllabics: ᖃᔭᖅ) were originally developed by indigenous people living in the Arctic regions, who used the boats to hunt on inland lakes, rivers and the coastal waters of the Arctic Ocean, North Atlantic, Bering Sea and North Pacific oceans. These first kayaks were constructed from stitched animal skins such as seal stretched over a wooden frame made from collected driftwood, as many of the areas of their construction were treeless. Archaeologists have found evidence indicating that kayaks are at least 4000 years old. The oldest still existing kayaks are exhibited in the North America department of the State Museum of Ethnology in Munich.

== Modern fishing kayaks ==
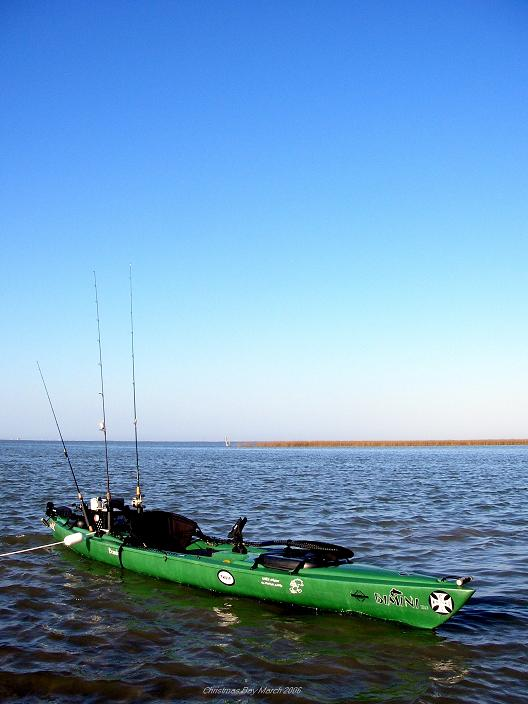
Sit-on-top kayak rigged for fishing

See also Fishing kayaks

While native people of the Arctic regions did not rely on kayaks for fishing, in recent years sport fishing from kayaks has become popular in both fresh and salt water, especially in warmer regions due to the ease of entry. Kayaks can be purchased inexpensively and have little maintenance cost. Kayaks can be stored in small spaces and launched quickly. Kayak wheels and trailers can be purchased to assist in the transportation of kayaks. Many kayak anglers have started customizing their kayaks for fishing.

These manufacturers offer special models for fishing that are designed and accessorized for this sport, including specially designed hatches, built-in coolers & rod holders, gps receivers and equipment mounts. Other accessories include live wells, anchor trolleys and running lights. Specially designed fishing kayaks usually have designs similar to those of recreational sit-in and sit-on-top kayaks characterized by very wide beams (up to 36 inches) that increase lateral stability. The increases stability allows for the angler to stand up and fish on the kayak. These kayaks provide a considerable space for storage inside their hulls which allow the angler to stow rods, fishing gear, batteries for fish finders, extra paddles, anchors, and wheels to tow the kayak from vehicle to the water. The cutouts molded into the top of the kayaks are well-suited to hold milk crates with additional supplies. Some anglers equip their fishing kayaks with outriggers to further increase stability. In recent years people have begun using kayaks for fly fishing, most models suited for upright fly casting include upright braces that allow you to safely stand up.

The most popular kayaks for fishing are rotationally molded from polyethylene due to their durability and lower cost. Hard shell kayaks are preferred over inflatable kayaks, since they are not susceptible to lure punctures. Generally, kayak fishermen look for stable, durable and comfortable designs. The new generation of twinhull (catamaran) kayaks that was recently introduced into the market is stable enough to enable both paddling and fishing in the standing position. This technological development also solves some ergonomic problems that are associated with sitting for long hours without being able to change positions, and frees kayakers from the need to sacrifice speed to stability, which is another problem that characterizes monohull kayaks.

Pedal driven kayaks have grown in popularity since their debut in 1997. Pedal driven kayaks utilize either a propeller or fin system driven by the paddlers legs, comparable to a bicycle. These kayaks enable fishermen to bypass paddling in order to keep their hands on fishing rods, allowing for more frequent casting and retrieval.

Kayak Fishing has taken off dramatically in South Africa. Game fish are caught along the coastline North and South of Durban. Large fish such as Marlin and Sailfish can be caught. On the east coast of the United States, the kayak is quickly becoming a favorite method for accessing fishing spots in the Chesapeake Bay and the Intracoastal Waterway.

== Fishing techniques ==
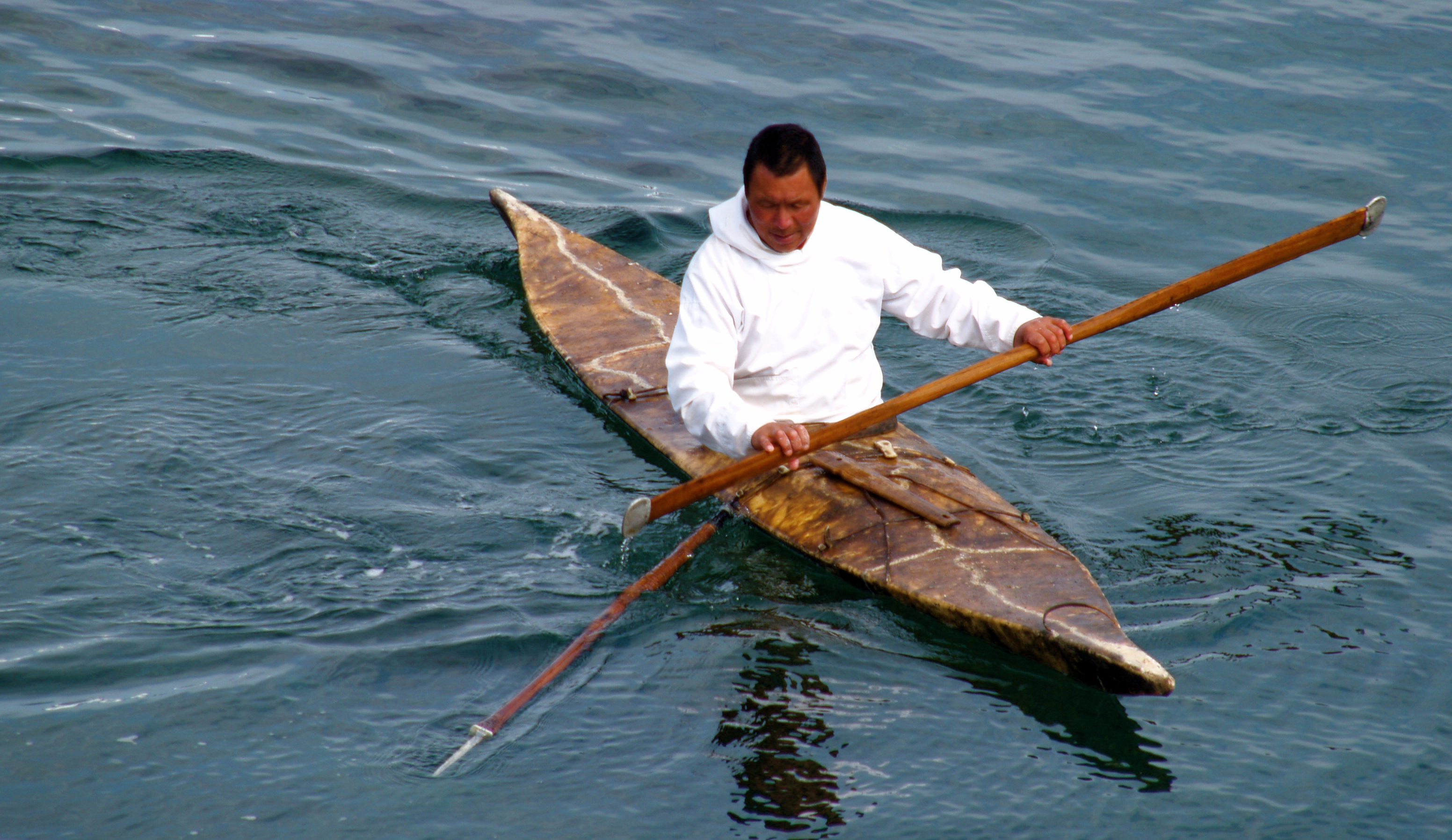
Inuk seal hunter in a kayak, armed with a harpoon.

Many of the techniques used in kayak fishing are essentially the same as those used on other fishing boats. The difference is in the set-up, how each piece of equipment is fitted to the kayak, and how each activity is carried out on such a small craft.

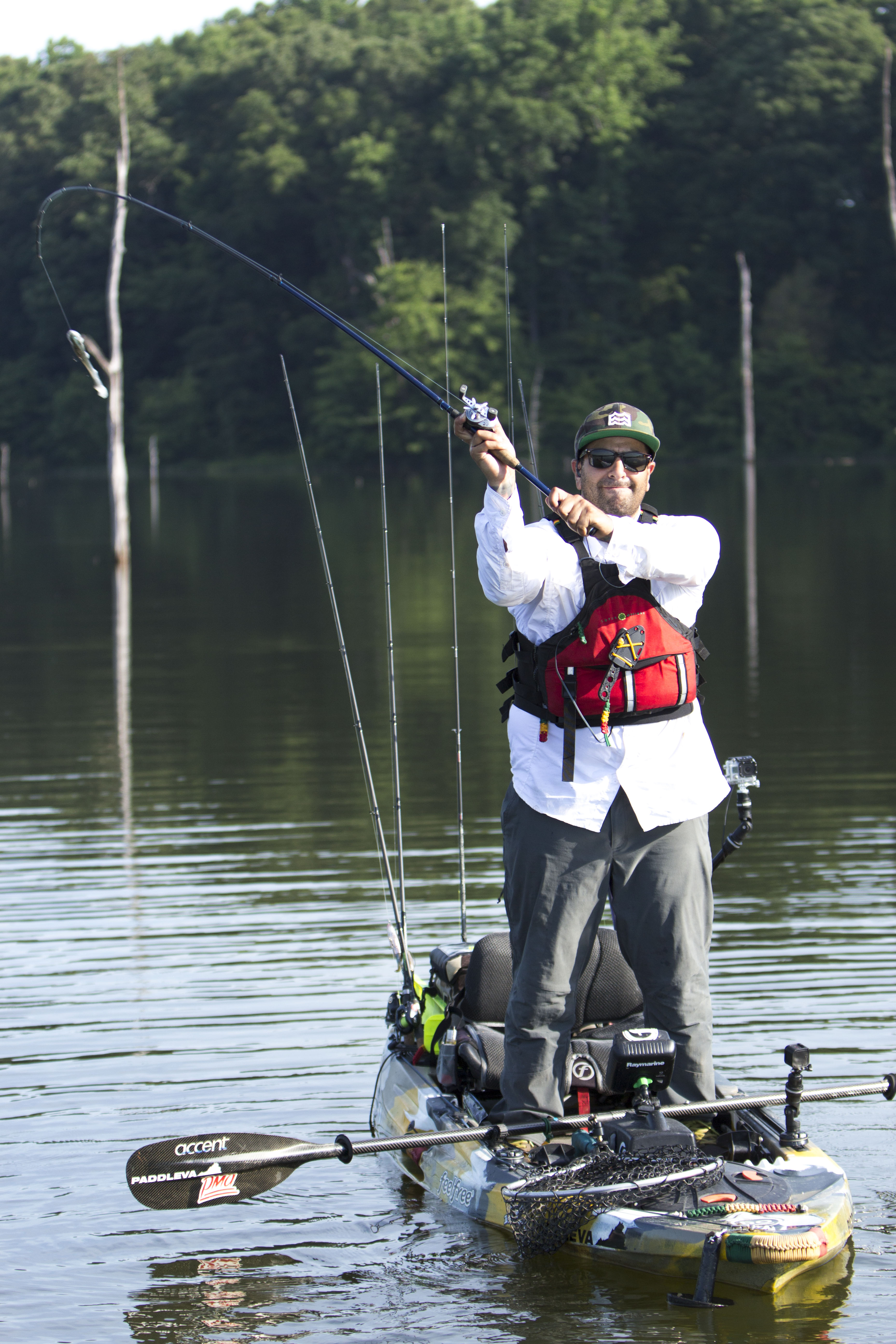
Modern fishing kayak - high transverse stability of the hull allows for safe fishing without the risk of overturning

Contemporary kayaks can be equipped with after-market fishing accessories such as anchor trolleys, rod holders, electronic fish-finders and live-bait containers. Kayak anglers target highly prized gamefish like snook, red drum, seatrout, tarpon, halibut and cod and also pelagics like amberjacks, tuna, sailfish, wahoo, king mackerel, and even marlin.

While bottom fishing or jigging can be done from small boats, it was long thought that effective trolling required speeds of five to ten knots, a speed well out of the range of someone paddling. However, the discovery that fish could be taken at much lesser speeds has increased the popularity of kayak fishing.

Another popular method of fishing from kayaks which has emerged is that of softbaiting. This involves weighted jig heads and rubber or plastic soft lures in the shapes of baitfish. This method is the predominant method now used, particularly in the Southern hemisphere, as it reduces the need to take messy livebaits on board the kayak.

Some anglers launch kayaks from larger boats well offshore so they can fish from the kayak. They find much excitement fighting a game fish as it pulls the kayak through the water.

Recently kayak fishing has started to move inland to freshwater lakes and rivers, where anglers target gamefish like largemouth bass, smallmouth bass, trout, muskellunge, and salmon.

Some benefits of kayak fishing are in the ease of use and transportation, the affordability of the equipment compared to motorized boats, they're an eco-friendly watercraft, and they provide exercise.

== See also ==
- Kayaking
- Sea kayak
