= Outline of sharks =

Overview of and topical guide to sharks

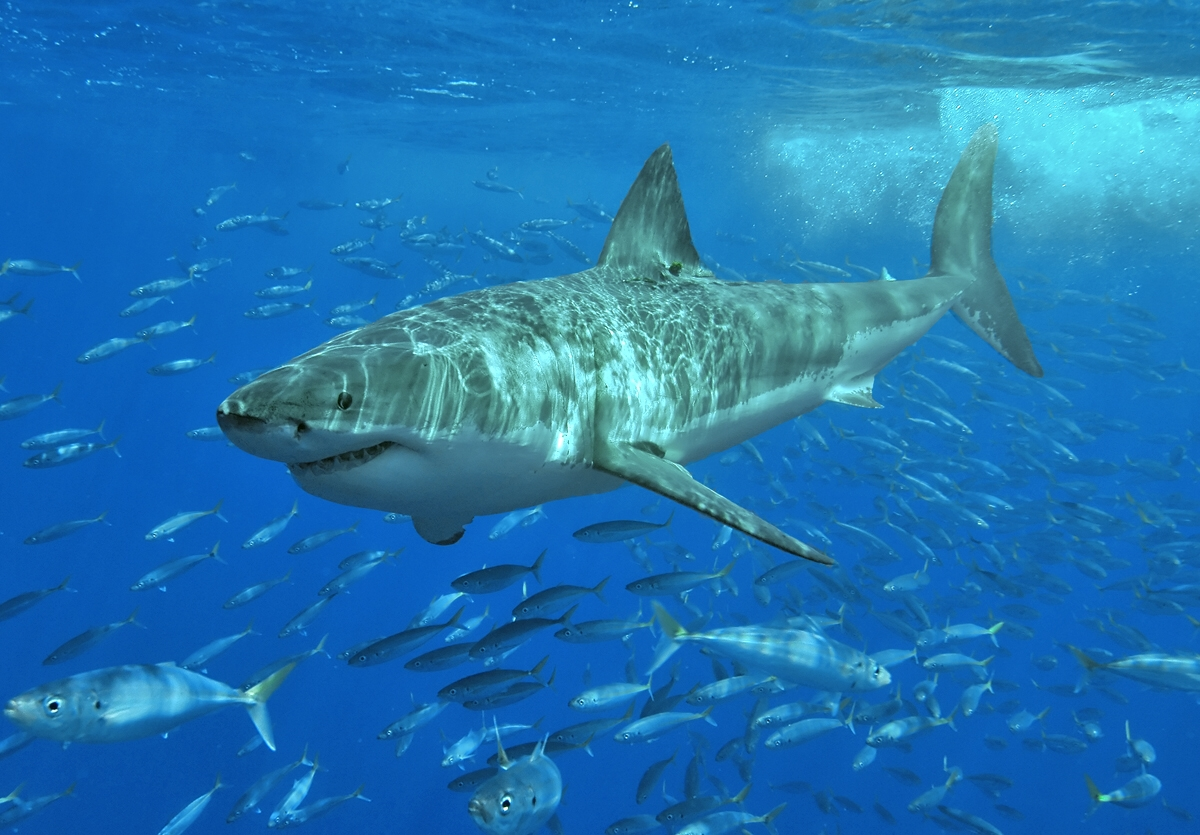
A great white shark at Isla Guadalupe, Mexico

The following outline is provided as an overview of and topical guide to sharks:

Sharks (division Selachii) are a type of fish with a full cartilaginous skeleton and a highly streamlined body. The earliest known sharks date from more than 440 million years ago, before the time of the dinosaurs.

== Fields that study sharks ==
- Ichthyology – branch of zoology devoted to fish (including sharks)
- Meristics – branch of ichthyology that relates to counting features of fish, such as the number of fins or scales

== Description ==
A shark can be described as all of the following:

- Animal – multicellular, eukaryotic organism of the kingdom Animalia or Metazoa. An animal's body plan eventually becomes fixed as it develops, although some types of animal undergo a process of metamorphosis later on in their life. Most kinds of animal are motile, meaning they can move spontaneously and independently.
  - Chordate – Chordates (phylum Chordata) are animals which are either vertebrates or one of several closely related invertebrates.
    - Fish – gill-bearing aquatic vertebrate (or craniate) animal that lacks limbs with digits.
      - Chondrichthye (cartilaginous fish) – jawed fish with paired fins, paired nares, scales, two-chambered hearts, and skeletons made of cartilage rather than bone.
        - Elasmobranch – member of the subclass Elasmobranchii, which includes sharks, rays, and skates.
- Predator – organism that attacks and feeds on prey (the organism that is attacked).
  - Apex predator – some shark species are apex predators, that is, predators with no predators of their own, residing at the top of their food chain.

=== Biological classification ===
Identification of the 8 extant shark orders

- Domain: Eukaryota
- Kingdom: Animalia
- Subkingdom: Eumetazoa
- Superphylum: Deuterostomia
- Phylum: Chordata
- Subphylum: Vertebrata
- Infraphylum: Gnathostomata
- Class: Chondrichthyes
- Subclass: Elasmobranchii
- Division: Selachii

== Types of sharks ==
List of sharks Subgroups of the Selachii include:

- Carcharhiniformes – ground sharks
- Heterodontiformes – bullhead sharks
- Hexanchiformes – the five extant species of the most primitive types of sharks
- Lamniformes – mackerel sharks
- Orectolobiformes – includes carpet sharks, including zebra sharks, nurse sharks, wobbegongs, and the whale shark
- Pristiophoriformes – includes sawsharks
- Squaliformes – includes gulper sharks, bramble sharks, lantern sharks, rough sharks, sleeper sharks and dogfish sharks
- Squatiniformes – angel sharks
- † Cladoselachiformes?

== Shark behavior ==
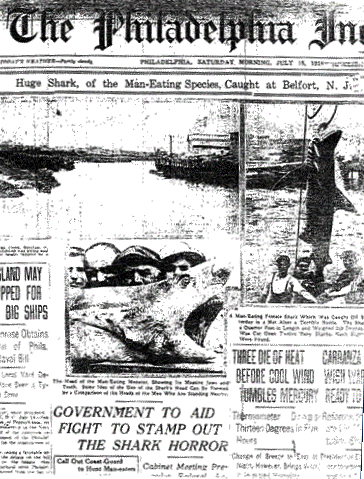
The Philadelphia Inquirer report of Jersey Shore shark attack

- Shark threat display – Behaviour shown by some sharks when threatened
- Spy hopping – Raising the head out of the water

=== Shark attacks ===
Shark attack

- International Shark Attack File
- List of fatal shark attacks in the United States
- Jersey Shore shark attacks of 1916 – series of shark attacks along the coast of New Jersey between July 1 and July 12, 1916
- Summer of the Shark – the name given to the summer of 2001 by American media outlets capitalizing on a bull shark attack and subsequent shark attacks

== Range and habitats of sharks ==
=== Range ===
- Bodies of water in which sharks can be found include:
  - Seas: all
  - Freshwater – some species of shark can live both in seawater and freshwater, and include:
    - Bull shark
    - River shark
    - Sandbar shark
- Depths: from the surface down to depths of 2,000 metres (6,600 ft).

A whale shark in the Georgia Aquarium

=== Habitats ===
- White Shark Cafe – remote mid-Pacific Ocean area noted as a winter and spring habitat of otherwise coastal great white sharks

==== Sharks in captivity ====
Sharks in captivity

- Shark tank
- Shark tunnel – underwater tunnel that passes through an aquarium that keeps sharks

== Shark anatomy ==
The major features of sharks

- Physical characteristics of sharks – shark skeleton, respiration and skin
  - Dermal denticle – small outgrowths which cover the skin of sharks
  - Ampullae of Lorenzini – sensing organ that helps sharks and fish to sense electric fields
  - Electroreception – the biological ability to perceive electrical impulses (see also Ampullae of Lorenzini)
  - Lateral line – sense organ that detects movement and vibration in the surrounding water
  - Shark cartilage – material that a sharks' skeleton is composed of
  - Shark teeth
  - Spiracle – pumps water across gills
  - Clasper – the anatomical structure that male sharks use for mating
  - Fish anatomy – generic description of fish anatomy

== Protective equipment ==
Simplified diagram of shark net

- Drum lines
- Shark net – submerged net placed around beaches to reduce shark attacks on swimmers
- Shark proof cage – cage from which a SCUBA diver can examine sharks more safely
- Shark repellent – method of driving sharks from an area, object, person, or animal
  - Magnetic shark repellent – use of permanent magnets to repel sharks
  - Protective oceanic device – first successful electronic shark repellent
- Shark suit

== Shark fishing ==
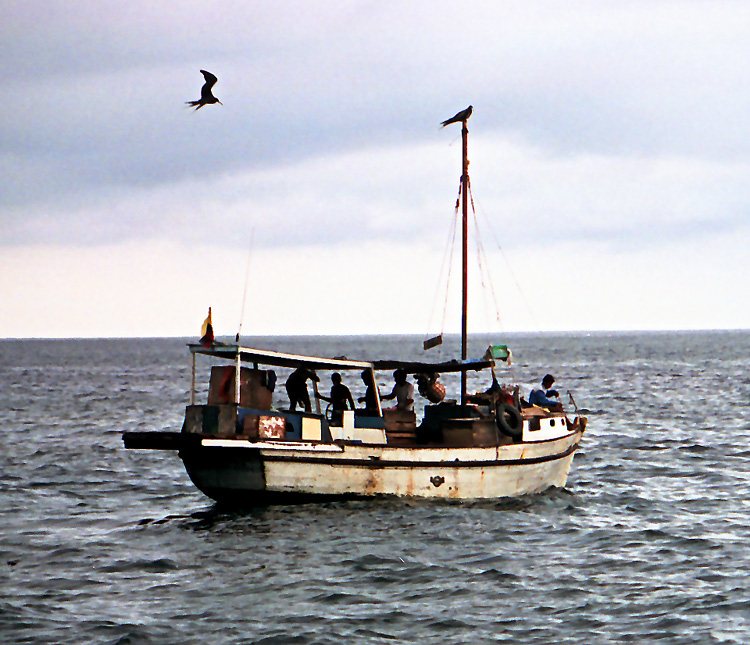
Shark fishing boat off the Galapagos, Ecuador

- Drivers of the shark trade
- Land-based shark fishing – fishing for sharks from land such as a beach, shoreline, jetty, pier, or bridge
- Shark finning – the removal of shark fins for commercial purposes

== Shark conservation ==
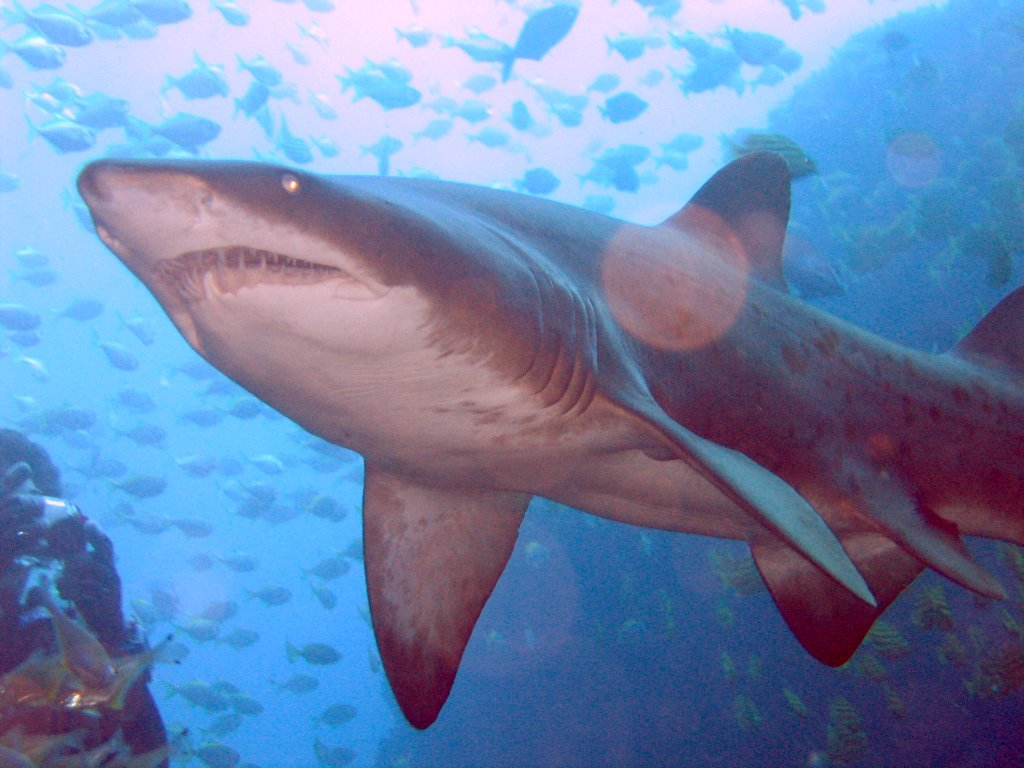
One of the first species of shark to be protected was the grey nurse shark.

- 1992 cageless shark-diving expedition – first publicized cageless dive with great white sharks which contributed to changing public opinions about the supposed "killing machine"
- Shark Alliance – coalition of nongovernmental organizations dedicated to restoring and conserving shark populations by improving European fishing policy
- Shark Conservation Act – proposed US law to protect sharks
- Shark sanctuary – Palau's first-ever attempt to prohibit taking sharks within its territorial waters
- Shark tourism – form of ecotourism showcasing sharks
- Shark Trust – A UK organisation for conservation of sharks

== Notable sharks ==
- Stronsay Beast – large, dead creature washed ashore on Stronsay, in the Orkney Islands, after a storm in 1808, later presumed to be a basking shark

== Notable researchers and people ==
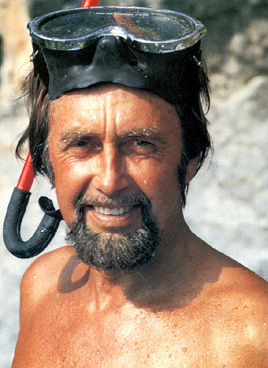
Hans Hass, diving pioneer

- Peter Benchley – author of the novel Jaws, later worked for shark conservation
- Eugenie Clark – American ichthyologist researching poisonous fish and the behavior of sharks; popularly known as The Shark Lady
- Leonard Compagno – international authority on shark taxonomy, best known for 1984 catalog of shark species (FAO)
- Jacques-Yves Cousteau – French naval officer, explorer, ecologist, filmmaker, innovator, scientist, photographer, author and researcher who studied the sea and all forms of life in water including sharks
- Ben Cropp – Australian former shark hunter, who stopped in 1962 to produce some 150 wildlife documentaries
- Richard Ellis – American marine biologist, author, and illustrator.
- Rodney Fox – Australian film maker, conservationist, survivor of great white shark attack and one of the world's foremost authorities on them
- Andre Hartman – South African diving guide best known for free-diving unprotected with great white sharks
- Hans Hass – diving pioneer, known for shark documentaries
- Mike Rutzen – great white shark expert and outspoken champion of shark conservation; known for free diving unprotected with great white sharks
- Ron and Valerie Taylor – ex-spearfishing champions who switched from killing to filming underwater documentaries
- Rob Stewart (filmmaker) – Canadian photographer, filmmaker and conservationist. He was best known for making and directing the documentary film Sharkwater

== See also ==
- List of ichthyology terms
- List of megamouth shark specimens and sightings
- List of prehistoric cartilaginous fish genera
- List of sharks in the Red Sea
