= Valerie Taylor (diver) =

Australian underwater photographer

Valerie Taylor AM
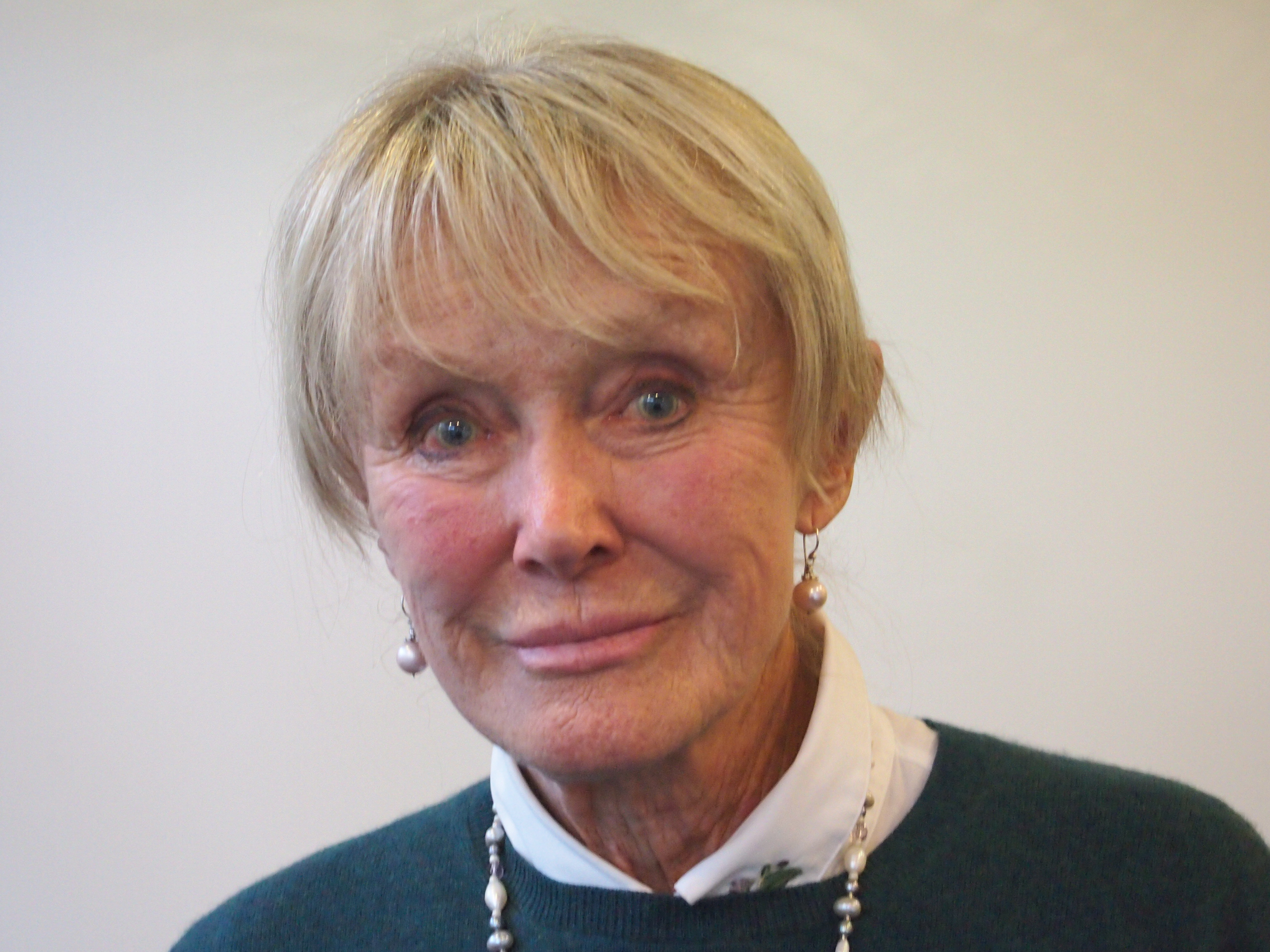
- Born: Valerie May Heighes; 9 November 1935 (age 90); Sydney, Australia
- Occupations: Professional diver, underwater photographer and cinematographer, author, illustrator
- Spouse: Ron Taylor (m. 1963; died 2012)

Valerie May Taylor AM (born 9 November 1935) is an Australian conservationist, photographer, and filmmaker, and an inaugural member of the diving hall of fame. With her husband Ron Taylor, she made documentaries about sharks, and filmed sequences for films including Jaws (1975).

== Early life and education ==
Born in Paddington, Sydney on 9 November 1935, Valerie May Taylor spent her early years in Sydney. Her mother was a housewife and her father an engineer for Exide Batteries. The family moved to New Zealand in 1939 to set up a battery factory there, but were unable to return to Australia when WWII broke out. At 12 years of age, Taylor contracted polio during the 1948 polio epidemic. Isolated from her family, friends and schooling she slowly recovered with the support of the "Sister Kenny Treatment and Rehabilitation Method". Taylor fell behind in her studies and left school at 15 years of age to work for the NZ Film Unit drawing for an animation studio.

Taylor returned to Sydney with her family to settle in the beachside suburb of Port Hacking, where she started diving in 1956 and took up spearfishing in 1960 to provide food for the family. She became an Australian champion scuba and spearfisher and met her future husband, Ron Taylor, at the St George's Spearfishing Club.

== Career ==
In 1967, a Belgian scientific expedition asked the Taylors' to join their endeavour to record life on the Great Barrier Reef. Over several months, Valerie dove the entire length of the Great Barrier Reef from Lady Elliot Island up to the Torres Strait. Taylor and her husband made documentary films about sharks, and were the first people to film great white sharks without the protection of a cage in 1992. Their work also included Blue Water, White Death, in which they swam cageless among a school of oceanic whitetip sharks feeding on a whale carcass. The documentary was successful, and attracted the attention of Steven Spielberg, who called on them to shoot the real great white shark sequences for Jaws.

In addition to their work in film, the Taylors have performed conservation work in Australia and elsewhere. They have campaigned to prevent oil exploration in Ningaloo Marine Park, the overturning of mining rights on Coral Sea Islands, the protection of the Great Barrier Reef prior to its being awarded World Heritage status, and they lobbied for marine sanctuary zones in South Australia.

Taylor worked as an underwater photographer, with some of her work appearing in National Geographic magazine. In 1973, some macro images of coral and invertebrates on the Great Barrier Reef were featured on its front cover.

During the early 1980s, Taylor began experiments with sharks wearing a steel mesh suit. The 1981 front cover of National Geographic magazine featured Taylor, off the coast of California, during one of these experiments with blue sharks wearing a chainmail suit.

Taylor remained active in lobbying in favour of marine conservation into the 21st century. She campaigned against ocean plastic pollution overfishing.

In 2014, Taylor campaigned against an Opposition Bill to remove sanctuary zones from marine parks in South Australia.

== Recognition and awards ==
In 1981, Taylor was awarded the NOGI award for Arts, Academy of Underwater Arts & Sciences, presented by the Academy of Underwater Arts and Sciences (AUAS).

In 1986, Taylor was appointed by Prince Bernhard of the Netherlands, the Rider of the Order of the Golden Ark for marine conservation. She was recognised for her successful efforts protecting of the habitat of the potato cod near Lizard Island, Queensland – the first gazetted protection of the Great Barrier Reef.

She was awarded the 1997 American Nature Photographer of the year award for a picture of a whale shark swimming with her nephew in Ningaloo Marine Park. By 2000, she was inducted into the Women Divers Hall of Fame.

In 2001, she was awarded the Serventy Conservation Medal for her work with Ron Taylor in promoting a greater understanding of the Great Barrier Reef and the need to protect its wildlife.

At 66 years old, she was still diving with sharks, and was awarded the Centenary Medal for service to Australian society in marine conservation and the Australian Senior Achiever of the Year.

In 2008, Taylor received the Australian Geographic Lifetime of Conservation award.

In 2010, Taylor was made a Member of the Order of Australia For service to conservation and the environment as an advocate for the protection and preservation of marine wildlife and habitats, particularly the Great Barrier Reef and Ningaloo Reef, and as an underwater cinematographer and photographer.

In 2021, a feature-length documentary film featuring archival footage as well as Taylor's life as an 85-year-old was made by Australian filmmaker Sally Aitken, called Playing with Sharks: The Valerie Taylor Story. The film screened at the Sundance Film Festival.

=== Personal awards ===
- 1981 – NOGI award for Arts, Academy of Underwater Arts & Sciences
- 1986 – Order of the Golden Ark presented by his Royal Highness, Prince Bernhard of the Netherlands
- 1993 – SSI Platinum Pro 5000 Diver
- 1997: American Nature Photographer of the year award (sponsored by the American Press Club) for a picture of a whale shark swimming with her nephew in Ningaloo Marine Park
- 2000 – Women Divers Hall of Fame
- 2001 – Centenary Medal and the Australian Senior Achiever of the year
- 2001 - Serventy Conservation Medal
- 2010 – Member of the Order of Australia (AM)
- 2021 - Jackson Wild Legacy Award

=== Awards won with Ron ===
- 1992 – Australian Geographic Adventurer of the Year
- 1997 – Jury award for the film Shark Pod at the Antibes Underwater Festival, France
- 1998 – Golden Palm Award for the book Blue Wilderness at the 25th World Festival of Underwater Pictures in Antibes, France
- 2000 – International Scuba Diving Hall of Fame
- 2002 – Wildlife Preservation Society of Australia's Serventy Conservation Medal
- 2008 – Australian Geographic Lifetime of Conservation Award
- 2011 – Australian Cinematographers Society Hall of Fame
- Life membership of the St George Spearfishing & Freediving Club Inc. (date of conferral not stated)
- 2012 – Renaming of the newly-declared Neptune Islands Group Marine Park surrounding the Neptune Islands in South Australia to the Neptune Islands Group (Ron and Valerie Taylor) Marine Park

== Personal life ==
Taylor married Ron Taylor in December 1963, and they worked and lived together until his death from leukemia in 2012.

== Publications ==
She has illustrated and written a children's colouring book, The Undersea Artistry (2017) and published her memoirs in 2019, titled An Adventurous Life.

== Film and television credits ==
=== Documentaries ===
Documentaries in which Taylor was involved in the production include:

- Playing with Sharks for Movietone News, 1962
- Shark Hunters, 1963; with Ben Cropp
- Slaughter at Saumarez, 1964
- Skindiving Paradise, 1965
- Revenge of a Shark Victim, 1965; about Rodney Fox (re-edited by Robert Raymond into SHARK which subsequently received a Logie Award)
- Surf Scene, 1965
- Will the Barrier Reef Cure Claude Clough?, 1966
- Belgian Scientific Expedition, for University of Liège 1967
- The Underwater World of Ron Taylor, 1967, narrated live by Ron Taylor
- The Cave Divers, 1967; for W.D. & H.O. Wills (Aust)
- Sharks, 1975; for Time-Life Television
- The Great Barrier Reef, 1978; for Time-Life Television
- The Wreck of the Yongala, 1981
- The Great Barrier Reef (IMAX), 1982; technical consultants
- Operation Shark Bite, 1982
- Give Sharks a Chance, 1991; with Richard Dennison for National Geographic Society and the Australian Broadcasting Corporation
- Shark Shocker 1993 (with Richard Dennison) for Channel 4 UK
- Shadow over the Reef, 1993
- Mystique of the Pearl, for Film Australia, 1995
- Shark Pod, 1996
- Shadow of the Shark (1999), for Australian Geographic

=== Feature fiction films ===
- Age of Consent, 1968
- The Intruders (also known as Skippy and the Intruders), 1969
- Blue Water, White Death, 1971
- Jaws, 1975
- Sharks and Men - Uomini e Squali, 1976 director Bruno Vailati
- Orca, 1976; live shark sequences
- The Last Wave, 1977; underwater sequences
- Jaws 2, 1978
- Gallipoli, 1981; underwater sequences
- A Dangerous Summer, 1982: underwater sequences
- Year of living Dangerously, 1982
- The Blue Lagoon, 1980; underwater sequences
- The Silent One, 1983
- Sky Pirates, 1984, underwater sequences
- Frog Dreaming, 1986
- The Rescue, for Walt Disney, 1987
- Return to the Blue Lagoon, 1990, underwater sequences
- Honeymoon in Vegas, 1991, underwater sequences
- Police Story 4: First Strike, 1995; underwater sequences
- The Island of Dr Moreau, 1995, live shark sequences

=== Television credits ===
- Skippy the Bush Kangaroo, Episode 3 – Golden Reef (1968) – original story & Episode 57 – The Shark Taggers (1968) – underwater sequences
- Contrabandits (30 episode series), 1967–68; underwater sequences and diving instruction for cast
- Barrier Reef (39-episode series), 1971–1972; direction of underwater photography, stunt work and minor acting roles
- Taylor's Inner Space (13-episode series), 1972–1973 with soundtrack composed by Sven Libaek and narration by William Shatner
- Those Amazing Animals, 1980–1981; contributed to underwater segments
- Fortress, 1985; underwater sequences
- Blue Wilderness (6 episodes)1992 cageless shark-diving expedition, 1992; with Richard Dennison for National Geographic and the Australian Broadcasting Corporation
- Flipper, 1995 series; underwater still photography
