= Malcolm Florence =

Australian game fisherman

Malcolm Florence (1945–1996) was an Australian game fisherman, writer and filmmaker who wrote for various magazines including Fishing World and Australian Outdoors. He made a series of short Documentary films for television broadcast and video release in the 1980s and early 1990s.

== Career ==
Florence played a significant role in the promotion of recreational fishing through his writing, filmmaking work and tourism business, which he operated in the Great Barrier Reef Marine Park. His documentary films were released under the series titles Big Fish Down Under and Action Downunder, as well as some stand-alone titles. He pursued sailfish off Western Australia with his son in Sailfish – A young man's challenge and went deep sea fishing off the Great Barrier Reef in another. In Great Whites of Dangerous Reef he demonstrated shark cage diving before catching a Great white shark on a line in South Australia. The film also features shark attack survivor, Rodney Fox. His commitment to his sport is seen in his 1984 film Beginnings: Sport Fishing History Down Under also variously titled Big Fish Down Under – Beginnings and Sport Fishing Down Under. Florence's films were produced by Dorado TV Cinema Productions and distributed in Australia by Festival Video.

Florence was a member of the Townsville Sportfishing Club.
