= Ron Taylor (diver) =

Australian diver and shark cinematographer

- Born: Ronald Josiah Taylor; 8 March 1934; Sydney, New South Wales, Australia
- Died: 9 September 2012 (aged 78); Sydney, New South Wales, Australia
- Occupations: Professional diver, underwater still photographer and cinematographer
- Known for: Expertise with sharks, conservation advocacy, underwater sports champion
- Spouse: Valerie Taylor (m. 1963–2012)

Ronald Josiah Taylor, AM (8 March 1934 – 9 September 2012) was an Australian shark expert, as is his widow, Valerie Taylor. They were credited with being pioneers in several areas, including being the first people to film great white sharks without the protection of a cage. Their expertise has been called upon for films such as Jaws, Orca and Sky Pirates.

== Biography ==
Ronald Taylor began diving in 1952 and became interested in spearfishing and underwater photography. He met Valerie while both were members of the St George Spearfishing Club in Sydney. They became champion spearfishers, but switched from killing sharks to filming them after becoming fascinated with marine life. They married in December 1963. They made their living in the 1960s by making wet suits and selling underwater cameras, plus doing artwork for magazines.

Taylor won the Australian Open Spearfishing Championships for four years in succession before winning the World Spearfishing Championship in Tahiti in 1965.

Taylor's first major underwater film production, The Shark Hunters (1962), was made with diving and business partner Ben Cropp. In 1964, he made the Slaughter at Saumarez, the first Australian diving adventure to the Coral Sea aboard professional fishing boat Riversong with free divers John Harding, Bob Grounds and Ron Zangari with Captain Wally Muller.

In 1966, the Taylors sold their shark documentary Revenge of a Shark Victim to producer Robert Raymond who won a Logie Award for his adaptation with new footage.

The Taylors were employed by the Belgian Scientific Expedition to the Great Barrier Reef as advisers and 35 mm underwater cinematographers, for six months, the first major educational project of this type on the Great Barrier Reef sponsored by University of Liège, Belgium. In 1969, Ron co-filmed Blue Water, White Death with Stan Waterman, Peter Lake and Peter Gimbel.

In 1974, the Taylors, assisted by Rodney Fox (above water), filmed the live shark underwater sequences for Jaws. They also filmed the live shark underwater sequences for Jaws 2 (1978) and the shark sequences for the film Orca (1976). In 1978, they published Great Shark Stories book.

Taylor first devised an idea of a diver wearing a full-length chain-mail suit over a wet suit as possible protection against shark bite in the 1960s but it was more than a decade before the suit was made and tested but it was found the suit was too small for Ron so Valerie wore it to test it with sharks.

In 1979, the Taylors filmed the underwater scenes for The Blue Lagoon. While on a dive trip in 1981, the Taylors discovered mining claims on several Coral Sea Islands. They brought this to the attention of the Australian Federal Government and saved these remote bird breeding islands.

Wreck of the Yongala, a TV documentary, was made in 1982, showcasing what was then the most spectacular of shipwrecks in shallow water. It was instrumental in having the wreck protected from fishing. The Taylors, inspired by Cairns game fishing charter boat captain Peter Bristow, lobbied via the media, the Queensland Government and National Parks to have the potato cod of Cormorant Pass near Lizard Island protected.

They were the first people to film great white sharks without the protection of a cage or anything else during the making of the series Blue Wilderness, Episode, Shark Shocker in January 1992, a huge milestone in ocean exploration together with South Africans Theo Ferreira, Craig Ferreira, George Askew and Piet van der Walt, founders of the South African great white shark cage diving industry. They tested an electronic shark-repelling barrier there. They were also the first to film sharks by night. Shadow over the Reef (1993) was filmed at Ningaloo Reef, Western Australia and was instrumental in preventing the test drilling for oil inside the Ningaloo Marine Park. The Taylors' documentary Shark Pod (1997) used the Protective Oceanic Device invented in South Africa by Norman Starkey of the Natal Sharks Board against great white sharks, tiger sharks, hammerhead sharks, and other shark species.

Taylor died on 9 September 2012 at age 78, following a two-year battle with acute myeloid leukemia.

The Realm of the Shark is a biographical account of the Taylors' lives between the late 1950s, and the late 1980s.

== Selected works ==
=== Filmography ===
==== Documentary films ====
- Playing with Sharks for Movietone News, 1962
- Shark Hunters, 1963; with Ben Cropp
- Slaughter at Saumarez, 1964
- Skindiving Paradise, 1965
- Revenge of a Shark Victim, 1965; about Rodney Fox (re-edited by Robert Raymond into SHARK which subsequently received a Logie Award)
- Surf Scene, 1965, featuring top surfers Robert Conneeley, Russell Hughes, Kevin Brennan and Tanya Binning surfing new locations at Noosa Head and Double Island Point, Queensland.
- Will the Barrier Reef Cure Claude Clough?, 1966
- Belgian Scientific Expedition, for University of Liège 1967
- The Underwater World of Ron Taylor, 1967, narrated live by Ron Taylor
- The Cave Divers, 1967; for W.D. & H.O. Wills (Aust), filmed in the area surrounding Mount Gambier, South Australia.
- Sharks, 1975; for Time-Life Television
- The Great Barrier Reef, 1978; for Time-Life Television
- The Wreck of the Yongala, 1981
- The Great Barrier Reef (IMAX), 1982; technical consultants
- Operation Shark Bite, 1982
- Give Sharks a Chance, 1991; with Richard Dennison for National Geographic Society and the Australian Broadcasting Corporation
- Shark Shocker 1993 (with Richard Dennison) for Channel 4 UK
- Shadow over the Reef, 1993
- Mystique of the Pearl, for Film Australia, 1995
- Shark Pod, 1996
- Shadow of the Shark, 1999; for Australian Geographic, directed by Tina Dalton-Hagege

==== Television series and movies ====
- Skippy the Bush Kangaroo, Episode 3 – Golden Reef (1968) – original story & Episode 57 – The Shark Taggers(1969) – underwater sequences
- Contrabandits (30 episode series), 1967–68; underwater sequences and diving instruction for cast
- Barrier Reef (39-episode series), 1971–1972; direction of underwater photography, stunt work and minor acting roles
- Taylor's Inner Space (13-episode series), 1972–1973 with soundtrack composed by Sven Libaek and narration by William Shatner
- Those Amazing Animals, 1980–1981; contributed to underwater segments
- Fortress, 1985; underwater sequences
- Blue Wilderness (6 episodes), 1992; with Richard Dennison for National Geographic and the Australian Broadcasting Corporation
- Flipper, 1995 series; underwater still photography

==== Films ====
- Age of Consent, 1968
- The Intruders (also known as Skippy and the Intruders), 1969
- Blue Water, White Death, 1971
- Jaws, 1975
- Orca, 1976; live shark sequences
- The Last Wave, 1977; underwater sequences
- Jaws 2, 1978
- Gallipoli, 1981; underwater sequences
- A Dangerous Summer , 1982: underwater sequences
- Year of Living Dangerously, 1982
- The Blue Lagoon, 1980; underwater sequences
- The Silent One, 1983
- Sky Pirates, 1984, underwater sequences
- Frog Dreaming, 1986
- The Rescue, for Walt Disney, 1987
- Return to the Blue Lagoon, 1990, underwater sequences
- Honeymoon in Vegas, 1991, underwater sequences
- Police Story 4: First Strike, 1995; underwater sequences
- The Island of Dr Moreau, 1995, live shark sequences

=== Bibliography ===
- Taylor, Ron; (1965), Ron Taylor's shark fighters: underwater in colour, John Harding Underwater Promotions, Glebe, NSW.
- Taylor, Ron & Valerie; (1976), Ron and Valerie Taylor's Underwater World, Ure Smith, Sydney (ISBN 072540342X).
- Taylor, Ron & Valerie; (1977), Sangosho no taiwa (publisher not cited), Tokyo. (Japanese translation of Ron and Valerie Taylor's Underwater World as published by Ure Smith in 1976)
- Taylor, Ron & Valerie; Goadby, Peter; editors (1978), Great shark stories, Collins, London, England (ISBN 0002162725)
- Taylor, Valerie; (1981), The great shark suit experiment, Ron Taylor Film Productions (ISBN 0959366903)
- Taylor, Ron & Valerie; Croll, Ian; editor (1982), The Great Barrier Reef: nature's gift to Australia-Australia's gift to the world, Beer Productions, Cairns
- Taylor, Ron & Valerie; Goadby, Peter; editors (1986), Great shark stories, Crowood Press, Marlborough, England (ISBN 0946284733)
- Taylor, R. & Taylor, V.; (1986), Sharks: Silent Hunters of the Deep, Reader's Digest (Australia) Pty Ltd, Surrey Hills, NSW, Australia (ISBN 0864380143) (hardback).
- Taylor, Ron & Valerie; (1987), Papua New Guinea marine fishes, Robert Brown & Associates, Bathurst, NSW (ISBN 9780949267771) (pbk.) (ISBN 0949267775) (pbk.)
- Taylor, Ron & Valerie; (1997), Blue Wilderness, Fourth Day Publishing (ISBN 0964273691) (ISBN 978-0964273696)

== Awards, honours and other recognitions ==
=== Ron ===
- 1962 – Encyclopædia Britannica Award for Playing With Sharks
- 1966 – the NOGI statuette for Education and Sports (then awarded by the Underwater Society of America)
- 1993 – SSI Platinum Pro 5000 Diver
- 2003 – Member of the Order of Australia (AM)

Citation: For service to conservation and the environment through marine cinematography and photography, by raising awareness of endangered and potentially extinct marine species, and by contributing to the declaration of species and habitat protection.

=== Ron and Valerie ===
- 1992 – Australian Geographic Adventurer of the Year
- 1997 – the jury award for the film Shark Pod at the Antibes Underwater Festival, France
- 1998 – the Golden Palm Award for the book Blue Wilderness at the 25th World Festival of Underwater Pictures in Antibes, France.
- 2000 – International Scuba Diving Hall of Fame
- 2002 – Wildlife Preservation Society of Australia's Serventy Conservation Medal
- 2008 – Australian Geographic Lifetime of Conservation Award
- 2011 – Australian Cinematographers Society Hall of Fame
- Life membership of the St George Spearfishing & Freediving Club Inc. (date of conferral not stated)
- 2012 – renaming of the newly declared Neptune Islands Group Marine Park surrounding the Neptune Islands in South Australia to the Neptune Islands Group (Ron and Valerie Taylor) Marine Park
