= 1992 cageless shark-diving expedition =

First recorded cageless dive with great white sharks

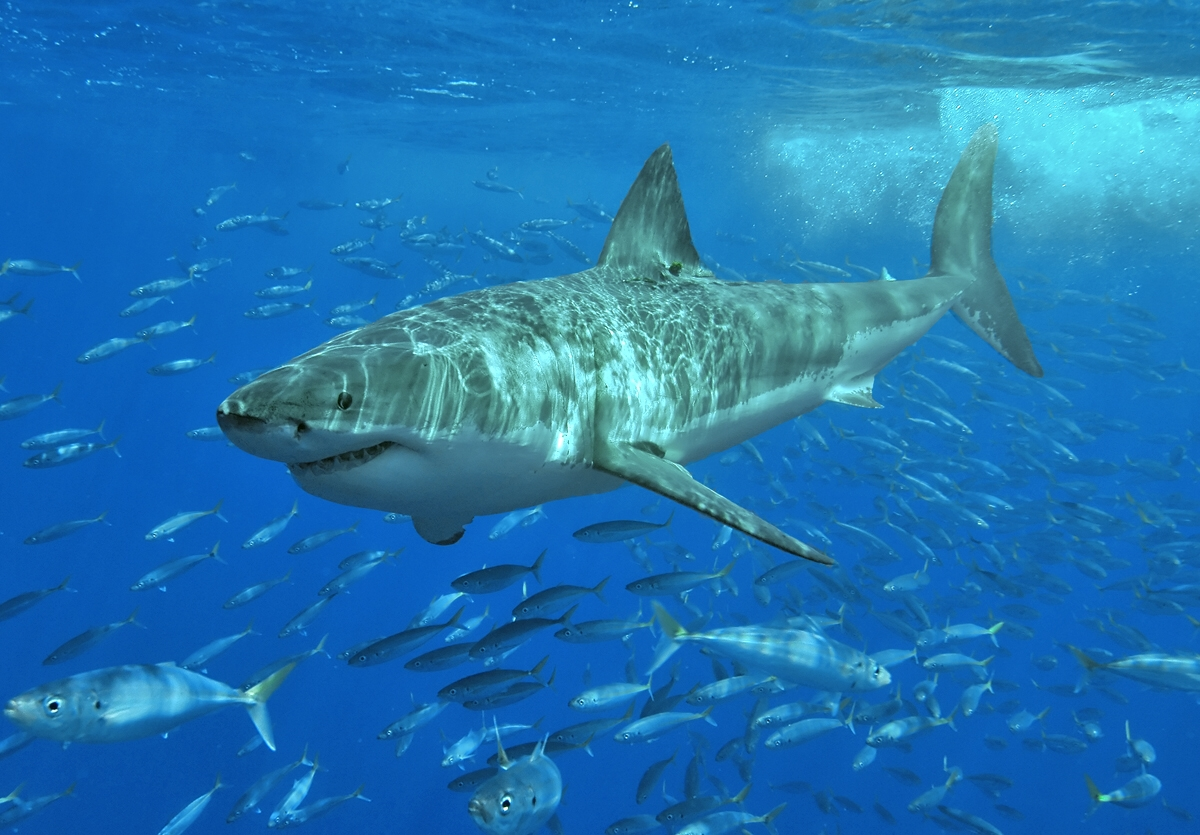
A great white shark

The 1992 cageless shark-diving expedition was the world's first recorded intentionally cageless dive with great white sharks, contributing to a change in public opinions about the supposed ferocity of these animals.

== History ==
The dive took place in January 1992, during the filming of the National Geographic documentary Blue Wilderness, at Dyer Island, South Africa. After 8-10 large Great White sharks had been kept around their boat for about 6 hours using chum and sea mammal flesh, four scuba divers carried out the world's first recorded dive amongst these animals without a safety cage, or any other protection, like chain-mail suits. The divers were Ron and Valerie Taylor, notable Australian film-makers and pioneers of underwater exploration, their friend George Askew, a South African diver and photographer, and Piet 'PJ' van der Walt, who had founded the South African cage-diving industry in 1988.

The Taylors and Askew, recognised shark experts and authorities, were testing their hypothesis that these animals had a much fiercer reputation than they deserved. Their hypothesis was based on many years of experiences with various types of shark, including face to face encounters underwater. In 1978, Askew had written an article entitled "The Jaws fish - Myth or Maneater?", published in the UK magazine Underwater World, proposing that Great Whites did not deserve the horrific image and reputation that Jaws author Peter Benchley and film director Steven Spielberg had imprinted in people's minds. Askew postulated that, as they rely on stealth and surprise when attacking, Great Whites would be unlikely to attack if you were aware of their presence. He had two more articles on the same subject published in 1983 and 1991, and then went on to prove that point with the historic dive in 1992.

Whilst surface testing of the prototype "Shark POD" Protective Oceanic Device (now Shark Shield) for the Natal Sharks Board, the divers discovered that despite having been excited for hours previously by large amounts of blood-laden chum (mashed fish, blood and oil) and chunks of dolphin and whale meat from washed up carcasses, the sharks were actually very shy and difficult to approach, even scared of these unknown intruders. After a long 20 minute wait, the divers had several timid encounters with the very cautious sharks and were never at any time challenged, nor made to feel uneasy. This ground-breaking "Underwater Everest" conquest, a huge leap forward in ocean exploration, strongly challenged the idea of the Great White as a "Mindless Monster" eating machine, and changed the way the world viewed sharks.

The Taylors felt that the Australian sharks may have a slightly different disposition to South African ones, but as it is now known that Great Whites swim between South Africa and Australia, this is open to debate. On two occasions many years before, they had released Great Whites trapped in wire ropes from cages without being harassed, despite touching the animals.

Askew had encountered Great White Sharks several times previously over the years whilst spear-fishing. The first was in 1960, when meeting one was considered to mean certain death. This encounter was with a very gravid female who had come into a small cove to drop her pup/s. She was in such an advanced stage of pregnancy that her body was distorted, with her mouth actually facing forward above her hugely distended stomach. She was what is referred to as a "Drop-Gut". In the animal world a mother is usually very protective and aggressive just before and just after giving birth, and yet this large Apex Predator showed no aggression towards him. Because of this and similar encounters, and those of his colleagues, he became more interested in this question.

Just before the dive, Askew and Ron Taylor were kneeling on the dive platform a few centimetres above water, with their hands in the water filming. Askew stood up and stepped back, and at that moment a four-metre Great White slid onto the platform and stopped 3 inches from his foot before sliding back, but made no attempt to snap or lunge at him. It would have taken his camera and arms, and maybe pulled him in if he had not got up. Askew sees that incident as pure opportunism and not savagery.

The Prototype 'Pod" Valerie is seen wearing during this dive was a dummy for continuity and afforded the divers no protection.

That first close encounter dive demonstrated that Great Whites are not built only to devour people but are very curious and can be quite 'friendly'. This dive is directly responsible for the upsurge in Shark Tourism – especially free-diving (i.e. Out of cage swimming) with big sharks. When existing and potential operators around the world learnt of the theory that the Great White was quite approachable and not likely to attack, it was hypothesised that the same applied to other dangerous sharks such as tiger sharks, bull sharks and oceanic whitetip sharks. This proved to be the case and shark tourism began to expand rapidly. It is now a multibillion-dollar a year industry, and has provided a lot of useful insights into sharks.

Since this dive some divers have attempted cageless dives with big sharks, even hitching rides on their dorsal fins and touching them underwater. However, such attempts are not recommended as sharks are still Apex Predators and very opportunistic. Although there have never been any serious incidents from free-swimming with Great Whites, the same cannot be said for other sharks. There have been a number of fatalities and other injuries.

== See also ==
- Andre Hartman
- Michael Rutzen
- Jaws
