= Longimanus =

Longimanus (Latin, 'long-handed') may refer to:

- Oceanic whitetip shark (Carcharhinus longimanus), a tropical and warm temperate seas shark
- Artaxerxes I, fifth King of Kings of the Achaemenid Empire, from August 465 to December 424 BC
