= You're My Best Friend (disambiguation) =

"You're My Best Friend" is a 1975 song by Queen.

You're My Best Friend may also refer to:

- You're My Best Friend (album), a 1975 album by Don Williams
  - "You're My Best Friend" (Don Williams song), the title song
- "You're My Best Friend" (That '70s Show), an episode of That '70s Show

== See also ==
- My Best Friend (disambiguation)
