= Blue Water, White Death =

- Film poster
- Directed by: Peter Gimbel; James Lipscomb
- Starring: Ron and Valerie Taylor
- Production company: Cinema Center Films
- Distributed by: National General Pictures
- Release date: 1971
- Country: United States
- Language: English
- Budget: $1,050,000

Blue Water, White Death is a 1971 American documentary film about sharks, which was directed by Peter Gimbel and James Lipscomb. It received favourable reviews and was described as a "well produced odyssey" and "exciting and often beautiful". It screened theatrically and was broadcast on television at various times during the 1970s and 1980s. The film was re-released on DVD in 2009.

== Film content ==
The film begins with a concise introduction to the great white shark, providing details about significant incidents involving these formidable creatures. Prompted by this portrayal, Peter Gimbel resolves to capture the great white shark on film. He embarks on a journey to Durban, South Africa, accompanied by a specially assembled film and dive crew, as this region is known for regular white shark sightings. Their documentation spans the country's whaling industry, and they trail the former whaling ship, Terrier VIII, which harpoons sperm whales, inadvertently luring in sharks.

While the first day yields footage of numerous sharks, including Grey Reef Sharks (Carcharhinus amblyrhynchos), Blue Sharks (Prionace glauca), and Oceanic Whitetip Sharks (Carcharhinus longimanus), attracted to a whale carcass, the elusive great white shark remains absent on the second day. In response, the team opts for nocturnal dives using underwater lights, significantly increasing their shark footage until the lights extinguish.

The subsequent day sees the successful filming of numerous sharks in open water, with the team occasionally utilizing electric shark prods and cameras to maintain a safe distance. The crew departs from the whale carcass the following day, navigating north along the East African coast through the waters off Mozambique, Madagascar, and the Comoros, ultimately reaching Grande Comore.

This leg of the journey yields extensive footage in coral reefs and mangroves, showcasing a diverse array of fish, including moray eels, barracudas, groupers, and smaller reef sharks. Despite these rich marine encounters, the Great White Sharks remain elusive. Following the advice of local French residents, the team sets course for Vailheu Shoal, a reported hotspot for Great White Shark sightings. Unfortunately, this expedition proves fruitless, prompting the team to press on to Batticaloa on the east coast of Sri Lanka.

Armed with fresh tips on locating large sharks, they venture to the specified areas, opting to forgo dive cages due to local conditions. This decision sparks doubts within the team about the feasibility of cageless diving. Undeterred, they decide to return to Durban and plan a subsequent dive in Dangerous Reef off the coast of South Australia—a renowned habitat for Australian sea lions and a high concentration of great white sharks.

In Dangerous Reef, the team eventually achieves success, luring three Great White Sharks with bait and capturing captivating footage from the dive cages. The cages come under repeated attack, culminating in a dramatic sequence where Peter Gimbel's cage is assaulted and pulled away from the boats by one of the sharks. Miraculously, the team manages to retrieve the cage, and no injuries are sustained.

== Cast and crew ==
The following people appeared in the documentary – Tom Chapin, Phil Clarkson, Stuart Cody, Peter Lake, Peter Matthiessen, Rodney Fox, Valerie Taylor, Ron Taylor, Stan Waterman, Peter Gimbel, James Lipscomb and Rodney Jonklaas. In 1986 Tom Chapin reflected on his role as an assistant cameraman on the production, joking that his life had "all been downhill since." Some underwater sequences appearing in the film were shot using shark-proof cages.

== Legacy ==
In Jaws at 50: The Definitive Inside Story, Steven Spielberg credited Blue Water, White Death as one of his inspirations for shooting Jaws.

James Lipscomb later made another documentary for Cinema Center Films, Cutting Loose.

== See also ==
- List of American films of 1971
- Dangerous Reef
- Jaws (film)
