= Richard Dennison =

Australian documentary filmmaker

Richard Dennison is an Australian documentary filmmaker.

His adventure films explore the limits of human endurance and survival; sometimes searching beyond those limits. Wildlife films produced by Orana Films are about people who fight for the rights of all creatures - especially sharks.

Historical documentaries focus on the extraordinary by-products of conflict - a Mutiny on the Western Front; or the fascinating process of rebuilding misfits in the French Foreign Legion. Travel and culture programs lead to some strange personal destinations.

== Orana Films ==
Richard Dennison is a founder of ORANA Films, one of Australia's most respected documentary productions. Most documentary makers are slightly twisted. Some are fascinated by the dark side; this one looks at life's struggles through the lens of hope. Richard Dennison is an international award-winning producer and director with a taste for unusual adventures that reveal as much about people as they do about the time and space through which they travel. His company, Orana Films, has produced more than thirty documentaries and many co-productions with the world's leading broadcasters.

Orana Films has produced more than thirty documentaries and many co-productions with the world's leading broadcasters. These include National Geographic; ZDF, Germany; BBC, ITV and Channel 4 UK; Antenne, 2 France; RAI Italy; ABC Australia, and many others.

== Filmography ==
Various documentaries produced by Richard Dennison through Orana Films.

Pioneers of Love.

A Glorious Way to Die.

Lasseter's Lost Gold.

Baseclimb.

Birdman of Kilimanjaro.

Blue Wet and Wild .

Blue Wilderness . (with Ron Taylor and Valerie Taylor)

Bushfire - Animal Rescue.

Chasing the Midnight Sun.

Continent of Fire.

Echo of a Distant Drum.

Everest By Balloon.

Flight of the Wind Horse.

Give Sharks a Chance. (With Ron and Valerie Taylor)

Journey of Origin - Chile.

Legion of the Damned.

Little Dove - Big Voyage.

Miracle at Sea.

Mutiny on the Western Front.

Off the Rails.

On a Wing and a Prayer.

Passage out of Paradise.

Risk.

Rite of Passage.

Russian Brides.

Shark Shocker. (with Ron and Valerie Taylor)

The Fatal Game.

The Fremantle Conspiracy.

The Great Camel Race.

The Human Race.

The Realm of the Shark.

The Social Climbers.

== Awards ==
Dennisons films are highly acclaimed worldwide and have won many awards.

Graz Film Festival - Austria

Off The Rails - Winner Best Adventure Film 2002

The Fatal Game - Winner Best Alpine Film 1997

Mountainfilm in Telluride - USA

The Fatal Game - Best Climbing Film, Telluride

A Glorious Way To Die - Mountain Spirit Award, Telluride

International Mountaineering Film Festival - Czech Republic

Off The rails - Winner Man and Mountain Award

A Glorious Way To Die - Winner Best Mountain Film

International Festival of Mountain Films - Poprad, Slovakia

Off The rails - Winner Grand Prize 2003

A Glorious Way To Die - Winner Grand Prize

The Fatal Game - Winner Grand Prize 1997

Film Festival Maritime Exploration - Toulon France

Miracle At Sea - Winner Best Film Toulon Festival 1998

The Fatal Game - Winner Best Extreme Film Toulon 1996

Banff Mountain Film Festival - Canada

The Fatal Game - Best Film about Climbing 1997

A Glorious Way To Die - Best Mountain Sport Film

The Human Race - People's Choice Award Banff

Special Awards

Mutiny on the Western Front

Winner of United Nations Peace Prize

Logie Award for Best Documentary

AFI Award for best editing

== Sources ==
- ORANA Films website
