= My Best Friend =

My Best Friend may refer to:

- My Best Friend (2001 film), Greek film
- My Best Friend (2006 film) (Mon Meilleur Ami), French film
- My Best Friend (2018 film) (Mi mejor amigo), Argentine film
- Minha Melhor Amiga (My Best Friend), 2026 Brazilian film
- "My Best Friend" (Skippy the Bush Kangaroo), episode of Skippy the Bush Kangaroo
- "My Best Friend" (Tim McGraw song), 1999
- "My Best Friend" (Jefferson Airplane song), 1966
- "My Best Friend", song by Annie from Anniemal
- "My Best Friend", song by Weezer from Make Believe
- "My Best Friend", a song by Yui Horie, see Music of Kurogane Communication
