= Ben Cropp =

Australian documentary filmmaker, conservationist and spearfisherman

- Born: 19 January 1936 (age 90); Skotolan Buka Island near Bougainville Island, Territory of Papua
- Known for: documentary filmmaker, conservation and underwater sports champion (spearfishing)
- Awards: Member of the Order of Australia (AM), 1999; International Scuba Diving Hall of Fame, 2000

Benjamin Cropp AM (born 19 January 1936) is an Australian documentary filmmaker, conservationist and a former Open Australian spearfishing champion. Formerly a shark hunter, Cropp retired from that trade in 1962 to pursue oceanic documentary filmmaking (having produced some 150 wildlife documentaries) and conservation efforts. One of his efforts for The Disney Channel, The Young Adventurers, was nominated for an Emmy award.

== Personal life ==
Cropp was born on Buka Island near Bougainville Island on 19 January 1936. His father was a Methodist missionary on the island. He lived in various places such as Casino, Ballina and Bellingen as his father moved to different parishes. He grew up at Lennox Head in New South Wales. Cropp had a very religious upbringing, but when he was 18 "broke totally away from that". His first marriage was to Van Laman, which "didn't last very long". His second wife was Eva Papp, to whom he was married for eight years. His third marriage was to Canadian Lynn Patterson. This marriage lasted 18 years and the Cropps had two sons, Dean and Adam, who are both making their names as cameramen.

As of 2007, Cropp was residing in Port Douglas, Queensland, where for twenty years he ran a shipwreck museum. Since then, he has resided on his vessel Freedom IV, mostly in the Trinity Park marina area, when not at sea diving, boating, fishing, and searching for uncharted shipwrecks. His "bucket list" includes finding a shipwreck that pre-dates James Cook's 1770 arrival in Australia, as he believes one exists.

== Career ==
Cropp was Ron Taylor's partner in the making of The Shark Hunters, a 60-minute black and white documentary sold for television screenings in 1961.

He discovered his first shipwreck in 1963: the Catharine Adamson. It was found off Sydney and became known colloquially as "the booze ship" owing to its cargo of alcoholic drinks. In 1964 he and two others found Matthew Flinders's ships Caro and Porpoise that were wrecked in the Coral Sea.

He became a conservationist after an experience off Montague Island in 1964 where he filmed diver George Meyer riding on the back of a whale shark.

In 1977, he discovered the wreck of HMS Pandora, almost concurrently with veteran film maker John Heyer and boat owner Steve Domm. At that time, Heyer had done extensive research to establish the area the Pandora wreck was likely to be found in and had launched an expedition to locate it with the help of Domm. Cropp had also done extensive research on the wreck and planned his own search jointly at the same time as Domm's arrival because of a pre-arranged date with a RAAF plane doing a magnetometer search for both of them. Cropp found the Pandora wreck on the Great Barrier Reef just before Heyer did. Cropp also lays claim to over 100 other shipwreck discoveries.

His searching techniques include wearing polarised glasses while looking along reef edges for signs of anchors, chain, hulls or timbers. In the 21st century, Cropp has taken to using underwater drones. In December 2019, Cropp discovered another wreck off Sudbury Reef, near Cairns with his son, Adam. In March 2020, the wreck was believed to be either Undine or Mermaid. Cropp has noted that sometimes part of the hull of a timber vessel has been located 50 miles (80 km) or more from the site of the vessel's last known whereabouts, owing to buoyancy and drift.

== Awards ==
In 1970, Cropp became an accredited member of the Australian Cinematographers Society and given a Life Membership in 2014. This was due to his winning numerous film awards, including the World Underwater Photographer Award in 1964, and his still photography was published in international magazines, including National Geographic and the cover of Time.

In 1999, he was appointed a Member of the Order of Australia.

In 2000, he was part of the International Scuba Diving Hall of Fame's inaugural induction.
