= Andre Hartman =

South African diving guide

Andre Hartman (born in Bellville, Western Cape, South Africa, 13 April 1952) is a South African diver best known for his work with great white sharks. In a Discovery Channel documentary known as "Great White Sharks: Uncaged" he is filmed free-diving unprotected with several great white sharks.

He is also seen free-diving with a white shark along with Jean-Michel Cousteau in one of Cousteau's documentaries, where he shows Jean-Michel how to grab a ride on the shark's dorsal fin. Another video, from Tow Surfing Adventures, shows Andre not only free-diving with a white, but petting it as it swims by, and even touching its nose as it opens its mouth toward him.

Hartman also appeared on an episode of MTV's "Wildboyz", in which Steve-O and Chris Pontius jumped off a boat with a great white shark. Hartman also did a trip with Steve Irwin off Gansbaai, South Africa in 2004. In February 2004, while chumming the waters during a cage-diving expedition, Andre's foot was bitten by a great white shark as they dangled over the edge of his boat. The South African newspapers claimed that Andre was free-diving with the sharks in the chummed water at the time of the incident, which is illegal in South Africa. The actual sequence of events that took place are disputed. Andre's foot never fully recovered.
