= Rodney Fox =

Australian diver, film maker and conservationist

- Born: Rodney Winston Fox; November 9, 1940 (age 85); Adelaide
- Occupations: Film maker and conservationist
- Known for: Survivor of great white shark attack

Rodney Winston Fox (born 9 November 1940) is an Australian film maker, conservationist, survivor of an attack by a great white shark, and one of the world's foremost authorities on that species.

== Shark attack ==
He was born on 9 November 1940 in Adelaide. On 8 December 1963, whilst participating in the 1963 South Australia Spearfishing Championship at Aldinga Beach, Fox was attacked by a great white shark, and badly bitten around the chest and arm. His story of the attack and escape has been published many times. He is regarded as a miracle survivor of one of the world's worst non-fatal shark attacks.

In the attack, Fox's abdomen was fully exposed and all his ribs were broken on his left hand side. His diaphragm was punctured, his lung was ripped open, his scapula was pierced, his spleen was uncovered, his artery was exposed, and he was minutes away from his veins collapsing due to the loss of large amounts of blood. The tendons, fingers, and thumb in his right hand were all cut and to this day he has part of a shark tooth embedded in his wrist. His wounds required 462 stitches after the attack.

== Later life ==
Fox went on to design and build the first underwater observation cage to dive with the great white shark, and for over 40 years has led major expeditions to film and study his attacker. He arranged and hosted the first great white shark expedition to welcome sport divers, and has run hundreds of expeditions in the thirty years since.

Fox is regarded as a world authority on the great white shark and has a great reputation as an expedition leader and producer of shark documentaries. He has been involved in some way with most great white shark films made in the 20th century. He has hosted expeditions for over 100 major feature and documentary films with film makers and shark researchers from 16 different countries. Disney, Universal, IMAX, Cousteau Society, and National Geographic have enlisted his help and have filmed and studied the great white shark from his cages.

Fox's life since the attack has involved consulting and co-ordinating film crews and arranging and guiding ecotourism adventure trips and expeditions specialising in great white sharks and other marine creatures. He also travels the world giving talks to people about his experiences with sharks and the need for conservation efforts to continue. His talks and films on the great white shark have educated swimmers and divers to the realistic potential of a shark attack. He delivers a firm message that "sharks are not all that bad, we have very few confrontations with them and we should look after all our fishes especially the great white". He positions it as an important "keystone predator" directly controlling the diversity and abundance of other species in the great web of life.

Fox has a large private collection of displays and items from 40 years film making on the ocean which are on tour around Australia and the world. They feature great white shark models, shark proof cages from the film Jaws (which he was one of the consultants for along with Ron Taylor and Valerie Taylor), giant and ancient fossil shark teeth, plus photos and video highlights from many films that he has been involved in.

Fox, along with his son, Andrew, after more than 40 years, still continue to run Rodney Fox Great White Shark Expeditions, a shark cage diving operation to view great white sharks in the wild off Southern Australia. This operation also acts as a platform for much needed further research of great white sharks as well as encouraging quality natural history documentaries on the species.

Fox and Andrew, along with shark researcher Dr. Rachel Robbins, founded the Fox Shark Research Foundation (FSRF) which is devoted to the study and conservation of the great white shark.

The great white shark is listed by the IUCN as a vulnerable species. The Fox Shark Research Foundation is endeavouring to expand our understanding of great white sharks, using the latest technologies and methods of research and working in collaboration with other scientific institutions.

Fox currently strives to further raise public awareness of the plight of all shark species through his dive operation and research foundation, via publications, public speaking, and the films his operations facilitate.

He was inducted into the International Scuba Diving Hall of Fame in 2007. In 2009, Fox was nominated for the 2010 Indianapolis Prize, the world's largest individual monetary award for animal species conservation.

The Rodney Fox Shark museum is in Mile End, South Australia.

== Bibliography ==
- Sharkman, ISBN 9780439474450

== See also ==
- Blue Water, White Death
