= Shark cage diving =

Diving inside a protective cage to observe sharks in the wild

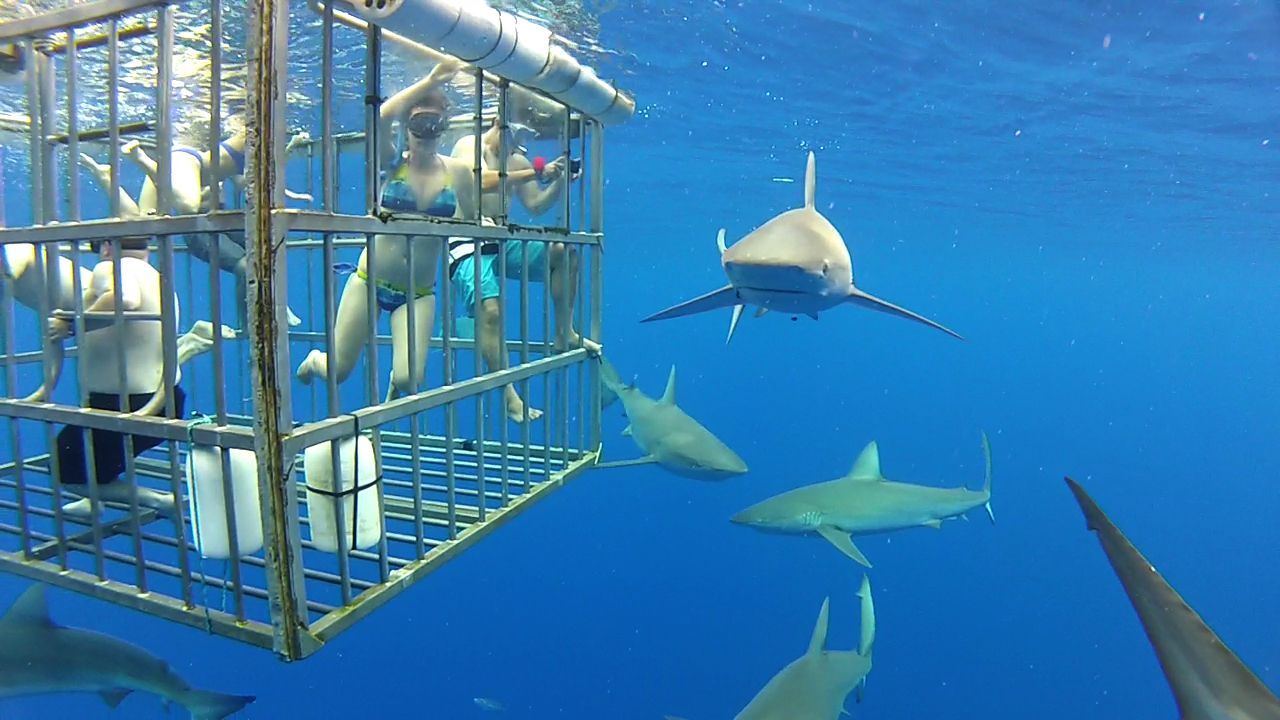
Sharks swimming outside shark-proof cage with people inside

Shark cage diving is underwater diving or snorkeling where the observer remains inside a protective cage designed to prevent sharks from making contact with the divers. Shark cage diving is used for scientific observation, underwater cinematography, and as a tourist activity.

Sharks may be attracted to the vicinity of the cage by the use of bait in a procedure known as chumming. This procedure has attracted controversy due to claims that it could potentially alter the natural behaviour of sharks in the vicinity of swimmers.

Similar cages are also used as a protective measure for divers working in waters where potentially dangerous shark species are present. In this application, the shark-proof cage may be used as a refuge, or as a diving stage during descent and ascent, particularly during staged decompression where the divers may be vulnerable while constrained to a specific depth in mid-water for several minutes. In other applications, a mobile cage may be carried by the diver while harvesting organisms such as abalone.

== Shark-proof cage ==
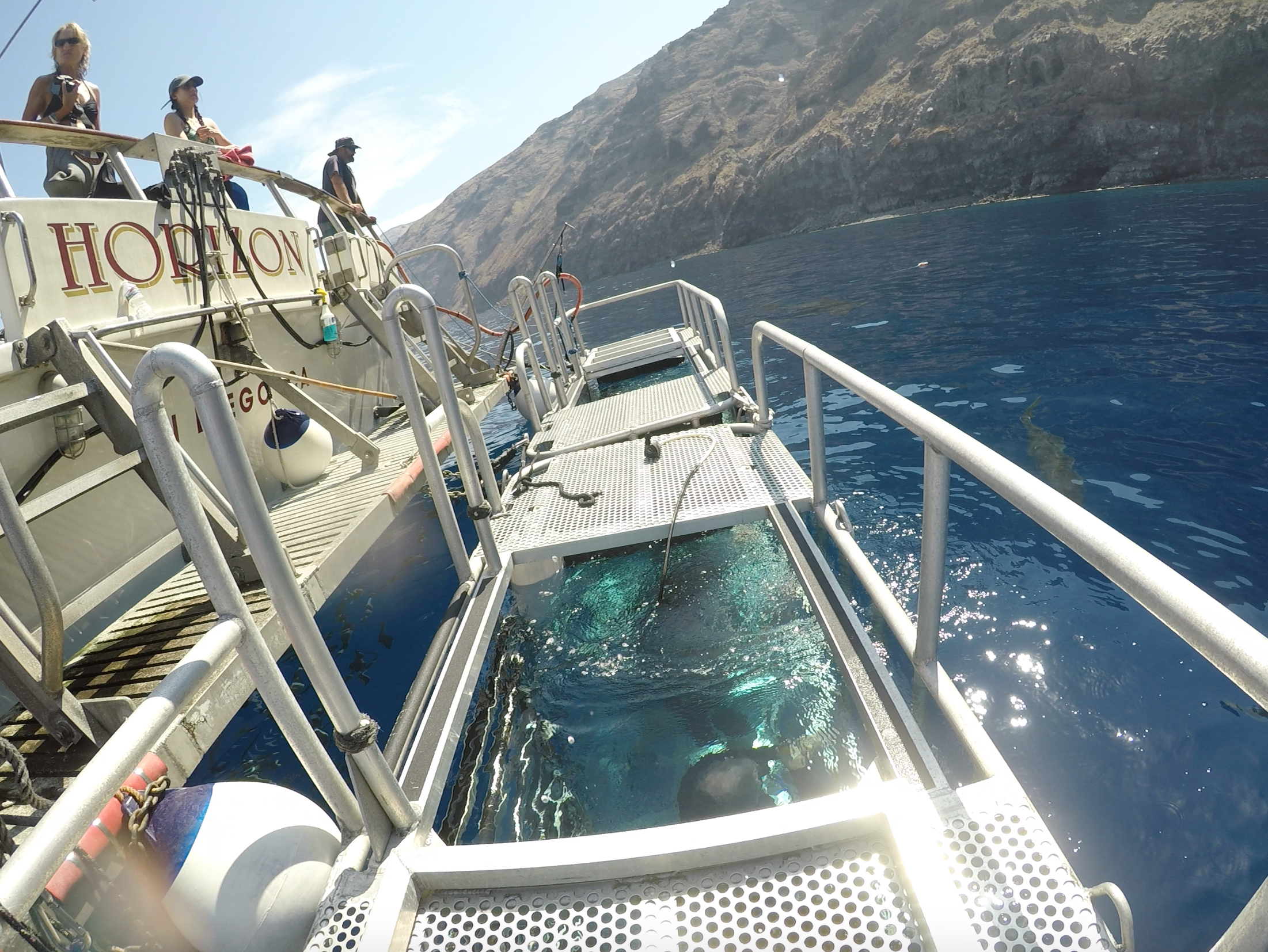
Great white shark cages at Isla Guadalupe, Mexico

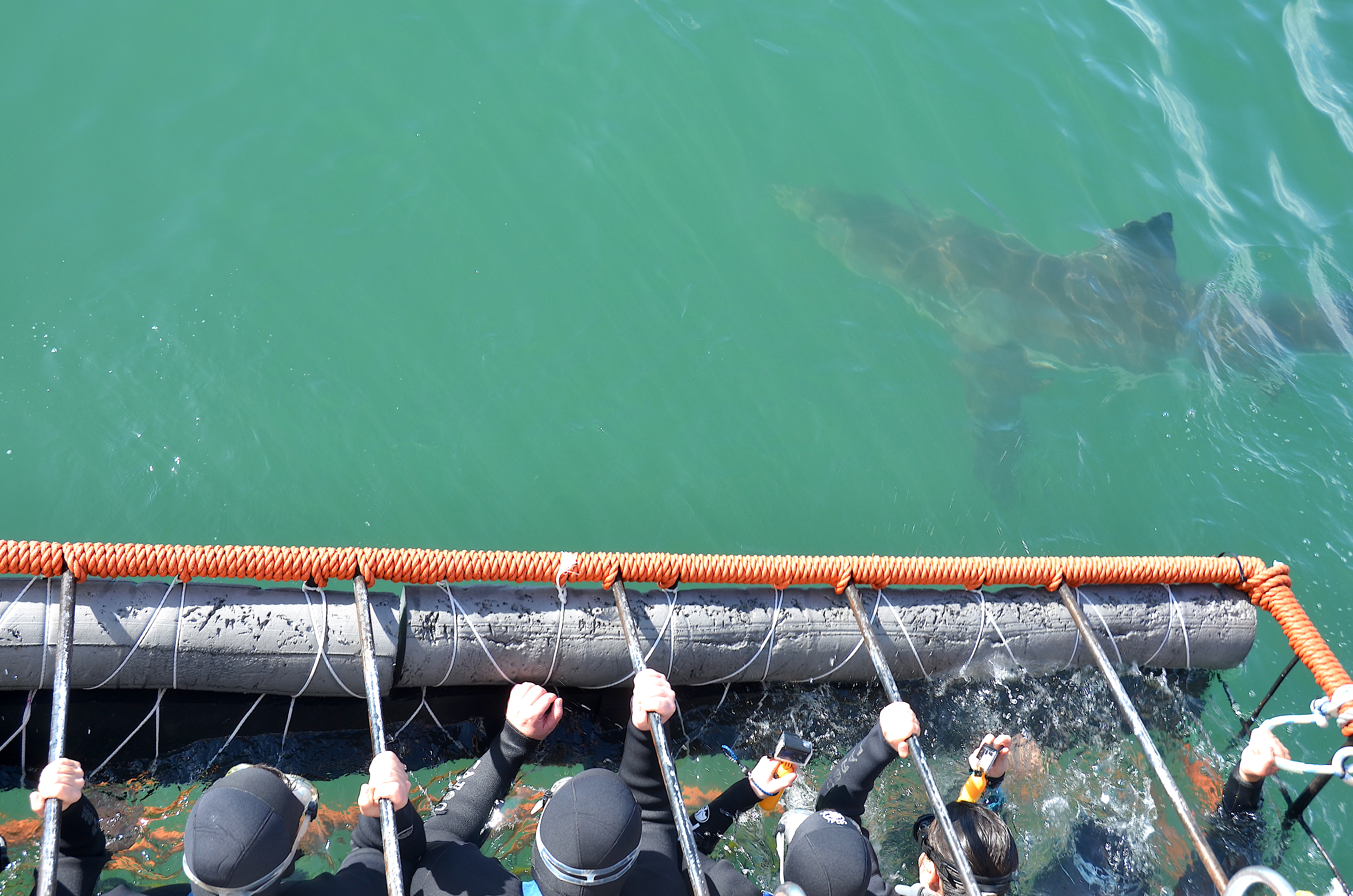
White shark cage diving near Gansbaai in South Africa (2015)

A shark-proof cage is a metal cage used by an underwater diver, to observe dangerous types of sharks up close or to harvest seafood in relative safety. Of the various species of shark, those most commonly observed from a cage are the great white shark and the bull shark, which are both known to be aggressive at times.

The shark-proof cage is also used in the controversial exercise of shark baiting, where tourists are lowered in a cage while the tour guides bait the water to attract sharks or stimulate certain behavior.

=== Early development ===
Shark cages were first developed by Jacques Cousteau. Cousteau used a shark cage when producing The Silent World, released in 1956. Australian recreational diver and shark-attack survivor Rodney Fox helped develop a shark-observation cage in the late 1960s. Fox's first design was inspired by a visit to a zoo he made after surviving a near-fatal shark attack in 1963. Filmmaker Peter Gimbel was involved in the design of a shark-proof cage for the production of Blue Water, White Death (1971).

=== Self-propelled version ===
In 1974, after several reported shark attacks on working divers in Australia, Australian abalone diver James "Jim" Ellis developed a self-propelled cage to protect abalone divers from sharks, which he patented in 1975. Mounting the motor in gimbals in the front of the cage makes the vehicle highly maneuverable. Movement and speed are controlled with a "joystick". The design allowed abalone divers to work without becoming vulnerable to attack. Due to the propulsion system, the divers would exert themselves less and, therefore, might be able to collect molluscs for longer periods. The patent abstract details a self-propelled cage with at least one access opening and a mounting frame that carries both an air motor and a propeller. Buoyant material is attached to the frame so that the cage may be made neutrally buoyant. The diver can control warm water piped to the diver's suit in cold environments. Propulsion was later changed to hydraulics supplied from the boat through the diver's umbilical. The patent expired in 1996, although Ellis continued to make improvements.

A 1975 version of the cage was acquired by the Australian National Maritime Museum in 1988.

== Tourism ==
During the 2000s, shark cage diving became more popular as a tourist activity. In South Australia, tourists are taken by boat from Port Lincoln to the Neptune Islands in the southern Spencer Gulf, where they view great white sharks either from a cage tethered to the back of a boat near the surface or from a cage lowered to the seabed. The government considers the activity to be one of South Australia's "iconic nature-based tourism experiences", which supports 70 jobs and contributes over $11 million to the state's economy.

On April 13, 2008, there was a fatal capsize of a shark cage diving boat off the coast near Gansbaai, South Africa, where three tourists died - two Americans and one Norwegian. The cage diving vessel was anchored on the Geldsteen reef near Dyer Island (South Africa) and engaged in shark cage diving viewing activities when it was capsized by a large wave estimated at 6m in a swell estimated at 4m significant wave height. The boat engines were off while anchored over the reef, and the skipper was at the back of the vessel handling the bait line attracting sharks towards the cage. A videographer was in the cage at the time of capsize filming underwater footage for the DVDs sold as a tour souvenir. During the capsize, all of the 19 people on board were thrown overboard. It was unknown at the time of the capsize how many passengers were onboard the vessel, and two American tourists were trapped underneath the capsized hull for more than forty minutes before it was realized that passengers were still unaccounted for. It was claimed by one of the defendants during the 2014 Western Cape High Court trial in Cape Town, South Africa that the wave that capsized the vessel was a freak wave, but statistically it was probably simply a larger wave in a 4 meter swell, that picked up over the reef. Since the vessel was anchored over a reef with engines off, it made a larger than normal wave more likely to break near the boat, and a capsize more difficult to avoid. There were other breaking waves shown in photos and videos which showed the increasing danger. The trial judge ruled that the skipper, cage diving operators, and boat owners were guilty of negligence. Being anchored over a reef in a large sea in dangerous conditions was ruled as the primary reason for the capsize and death of the three tourists, Shark cage diving was incidental, but was the reason for the vessel to have remained anchored over a shallow reef, with engines off, despite increasing swells and breaking waves. If sharks had not been present and if the videographer had not still been in the cage filming they would have probably have already left.

=== Shark baiting ===
Shark baiting is a procedure where the water is baited by chumming with fish or other materials attractive to sharks. Tourists remain inside a shark-proof cage while tour guides bait the waters to attract sharks for the tourists to observe. There have been claims that this could lead to potentially aggressive behavior by the shark population. Some conservation groups, scuba divers, and underwater photographers consider the practice undesirable and potentially dangerous.

In South Australia, abalone divers have been attacked by great white sharks, and divers believe that shark cage diving tourism has altered shark behavior, including making them more inclined to approach boats. The government of South Australia claims that there is "no scientific evidence" to suggest that the general public is at elevated risk of shark attack as a result of shark cage tourism.

Opponents of the cage diving industry include shark attack survivor Craig Bovim, who was reportedly bitten by a ragged-tooth shark while snorkeling for lobster off Scarborough Beach. Since the attack occurred near where shark cage boats operate, Bovim alleged that the chumming used to lure sharks to the tourist cages altered the natural behaviour of the sharks. There is evidence that the baiting of sharks for tourism does alter the patterns of movement of great white sharks.

== Notable incidents ==
In 2005, a British tourist, Mark Currie, was exposed to a high risk of injury or death when a 5-metre (18 ft) great white shark bit through the bars of a shark cage being used during a recreational shark dive off the coast of South Africa. The shark circled the boat several times, and began to attack the side of the cage, then started to crush and bite through. The captain attempted to free the cage by trying to distract the shark, hitting it on the head with an iron pole. The shark bit into one of the buoys at the top of the cage, which caused the cage to begin sinking. Currie quickly swam out of the top of the cage and was pulled to safety by the boat's captain, who fended off the shark with blows to its head.

In 2007, a commercial shark cage was destroyed off the coast of Guadalupe Island after a 4.6-metre (15 ft) great white shark became entangled and tore the cage apart in a frantic effort to free itself.

Another incident reported in 2016 occurred off the coast of Mexico, when a shark that lunged for the bait broke into the cage and the diver was able to escape uninjured.

== See also ==
- Shark net – Submerged barrier that protects swimmers from shark attacks
- Shark Shield – Personal electromagnetic field shark deterrent device
