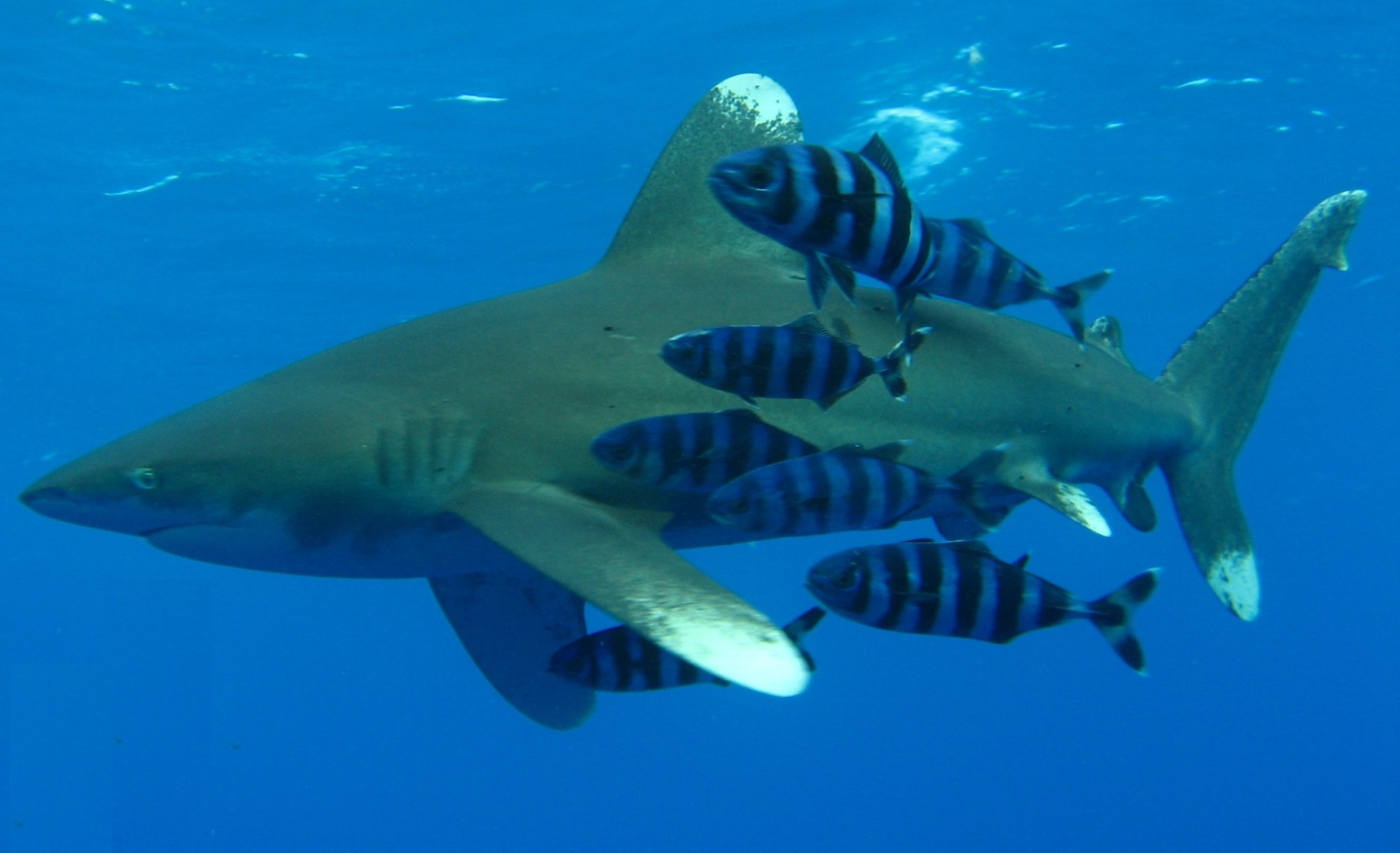
- Female, surrounded by pilot fish, Red Sea

Conservation status
- Critically Endangered (IUCN 3.1)
- CITES Appendix I

Scientific classification
- Kingdom: Animalia
- Phylum: Chordata
- Class: Chondrichthyes
- Subclass: Elasmobranchii
- Division: Selachii
- Order: Carcharhiniformes
- Family: Carcharhinidae
- Genus: Carcharhinus
- Species: C. longimanus

Binomial name
- Carcharhinus longimanus (Poey, 1861)
- Range of the oceanic whitetip shark

Synonyms
- List: Squalus maou Lesson, 1831; Carcharhinus maou (Lesson, 1831); Squalus longimanus Poey, 1861; Carcharias longimanus (Poey, 1861); Pterolamiops longimanus (Poey, 1861); Carcharinus longimanus (Poey, 1861) (typo); Carcharias obtusus (Garman, 1881); Carcharias insularum Snyder, 1904; Pterolamiops magnipinnis Smith, 1958; Pterolamiops budkeri Fourmanoir, 1961

= Oceanic whitetip shark =

Oceanic whitetip shark Temporal range: Early Miocene to present

Species of requiem shark

The oceanic whitetip shark (Carcharhinus longimanus) is a large requiem shark inhabiting the pelagic zone of tropical and warm temperate seas. It has a stocky body and iconic elongated rounded fins, with white tips. The species is typically solitary, though they may gather in large numbers at food concentrations. Bony fish and cephalopods are the main components of its diet and females give live birth.

Though slow-moving, the shark is opportunistic and aggressive, and is reputed to be dangerous to shipwreck survivors. The IUCN Red List considers the species to be critically endangered. As with other shark species, the whitetip faces mounting fishing pressure throughout its range, with recent studies show steeply declining populations as they are harvested for their fins and meat.

== Taxonomy ==
The oceanic whitetip shark is also known as the brown shark, shipwreck shark, whitetip shark, or lesser white shark.

The species was described in 1831 by naturalist René-Primevère Lesson, who named the shark Carcharhinus maou. It was next described by zoologist Felipe Poey in 1861 as Squalus longimanus. The name Pterolamiops longimanus has also been used. The rules of the International Commission on Zoological Nomenclature are that in general the first-published description has priority; therefore, the valid scientific name for the oceanic whitetip shark should be Carcharhinus maou. However, Lesson's name remained forgotten for so long that Carcharhinus longimanus remains widely accepted. The species epithet longimanus refers to the size of its pectoral fins (longi-manus means "long hands" in Latin).

The earliest fossil teeth of this species are known from the Early Miocene of Odisha, India. They are also known from the Pliocene of Italy and Spain.

== Distribution and habitat ==
This shark is found worldwide between 45°N and 43°S latitude. It lives in deep, open oceans, with a temperature greater than 18 °C (64 °F), It prefers water temperatures above 20 °C (68 °F), and up to 28 °C (82 °F) but can also be found in waters as cool as 15 °C (59 °F) but avoids temperatures lower than this. It was once extremely common and widely distributed, and still inhabits a wide band around the globe; however, recent studies suggest that its numbers have drastically declined.

The shark spends most of its time in the upper layer of the ocean—to a depth of 150 m (490 ft)—and prefers off-shore, deep-ocean areas. According to longline capture data, increasing distance from land correlates to a greater population of sharks. It is sometimes found close to land, in waters as shallow as only 37 m (120 ft) deep, mainly around oceanic islands and narrow continental shelves.

== Description ==
C. longimanus' most distinguishing characteristics are its long, wing-like pectoral and dorsal fins. The fins are significantly larger than most other shark species, and have conspicuously rounded tips. The shark's snout is rounded and its eyes are circular, with nictitating membranes.

The species is grey-bronze dorsally and white ventrally, being countershaded. As its name suggests, most of its fins (dorsal, pectoral, pelvic and caudal) have white tips. Along with white tips, the fins may be mottled, and young specimens can have black marks. A saddle-shaped patch may be apparent between first and second dorsal fins. The shark has two morphs of teeth; those in the mandible (lower jaw) are thinner with a serrated tip, while the teeth in the upper jaw are triangular, but much larger and wider with entirely serrated edges. The lower jaw has between 13 and 15 teeth on either half of the jaw, while the upper has 14 or 15 on each half. The denticles are nearly flat and wide, typically have between five and seven ridges. There is little overlap between them, revealing some bare skin.

The oceanic whitetip shark is a robust, large-bodied shark. The largest specimen ever caught measured at more than 4 m (13 ft) in length, though they usually grow up to 3 m (10 ft) in length and 150 kg (330 lb) in weight. However, the all-tackle record listed by the International Game Fish Association (IGFA) is 167 kg (368 lb) for a 2.2-metre (7.2 ft) long individual, suggesting that weight is likely much more in larger individuals. The female is typically larger than the male by 10 cm (3.9 in). In the Gulf of Mexico in the 1950s, the mean weight of oceanic whitetip sharks was 86.4 kg (190 lb). In the 1990s, the sharks of the species from the same area averaged only 56.1 kg (124 lb).

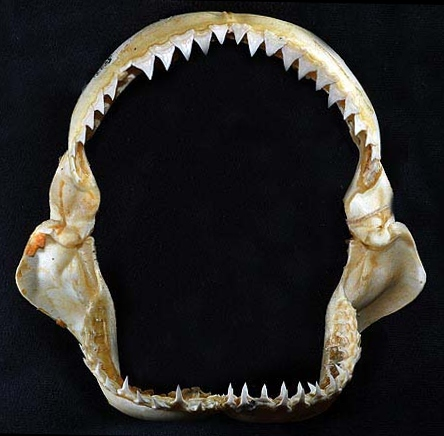
Jaws

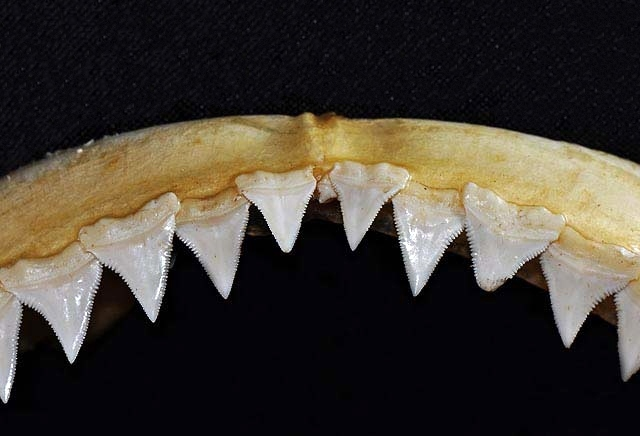
Upper teeth

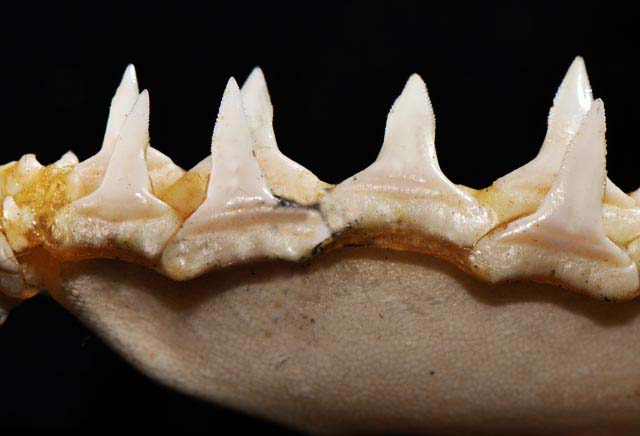
Lower teeth

== Biology ==
The oceanic whitetip is typically solitary, though gatherings have been observed where food is plentiful. It swims during the day and night. The oceanic whitetip usually moves slowly, cruising near the top of the water column in open water. During summer, when the ocean surface is warmer, oceanic whitetips tend to swim more quickly and at deeper depths. They have been observed to breach out of the water (akin to a whale).

The oceanic whitetip shark feeds mainly on pelagic cephalopods, like squid, and bony fish, such as lancetfish, threadfins, oarfish, barracuda, jacks, mahi-mahi, marlin, tuna, and mackerel. However, its diet can be far more varied and less selective—it is known to eat stingrays, sea turtles, seabirds, gastropods, crustaceans, and marine mammal carcasses. Its feeding methods include swimming through schools of frenzied tuna with an open mouth, waiting for the fish to swim in before biting down; when whaling formerly took place in warm waters, oceanic whitetips were the most common scavengers of floating carcasses, which may explain why they are sometimes considered one of the "whaler sharks". Whitetips commonly compete for food with silky sharks, and the two species are often found together but oceanic whitetip sharks are more aggressive despite a more leisurely swimming style. They are known to trail pilot whales as they both feed on squid. Evidence in the form of sucker scars on the skin of an individual filmed off Hawaii indicate that the species may also dive deep enough to battle with large squid, such as the giant squid.

Groups often form when individual sharks converge on a food source. They are recorded to segregate by both sex and size. They commonly get into feeding frenzies. Oceanic whitetips gather in large numbers off Cat Island, Bahamas from winter to spring, due to the abundance of large bony fish.

Pilot fish, dolphinfish, and remora may follow these sharks.

=== Life cycle ===
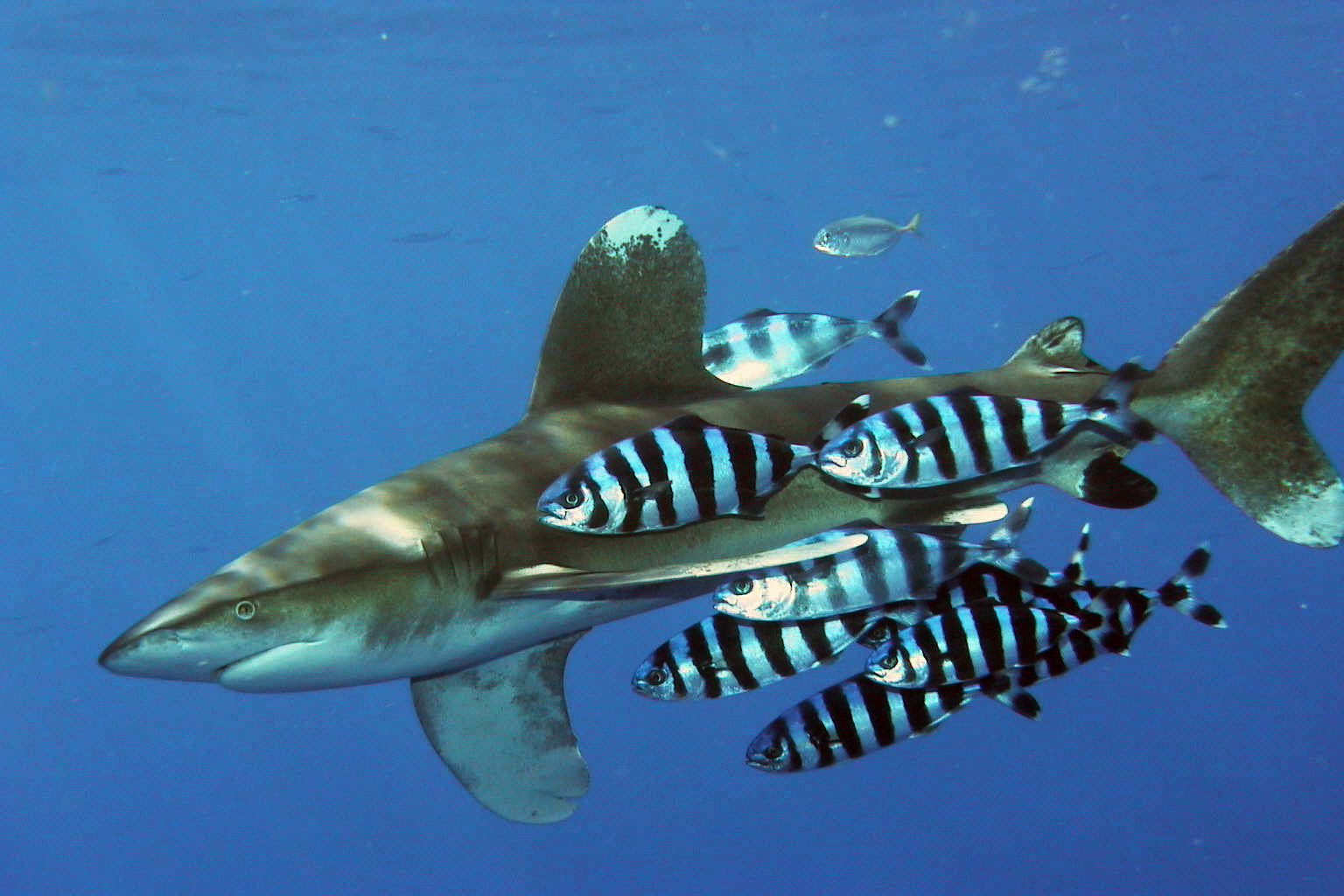
Oceanic whitetip photographed at the Elphinstone reef, Red Sea, Egypt, accompanied by pilot fish

Mating and birthing seems to occur in early summer in the northwest Atlantic Ocean and southwest Indian Ocean, although females captured in the Pacific have been found with embryos year round, suggesting a longer mating season there. The shark is viviparous—embryos develop in utero and are fed by a placental sac. Its gestation period lasts nine months to one year. In the northwest Atlantic, shark pups are born 65–75 cm (26–30 in) long while off South Africa, birth length is 60–65 cm (24–26 in) long. In the Pacific Ocean, newborns average 45–55 cm (18–22 in) long, and number two to fourteen per litter.

In one population off Brazil, sharks were recorded to grow an average of 25.2 cm (9.9 in) in one year, reducing to 13.6 cm (5.4 in) per year up to four years and then 9.7 cm (3.8 in) in their fifth year. Both sexes reached maturity at 180–190 cm (71–75 in) between the ages of six and seven and continued to grow at 9.10 cm (3.58 in) per year. The average length of maturity for sharks averages in the greater equatorial and southwestern Atlantic is 170 cm (67 in) for females and 170–190 cm (67–75 in) for males. In the Pacific, sharks appear to mature at four to five years. One oceanic whitetip shark was estimated to have lived 22 years.

== Relation to humans ==
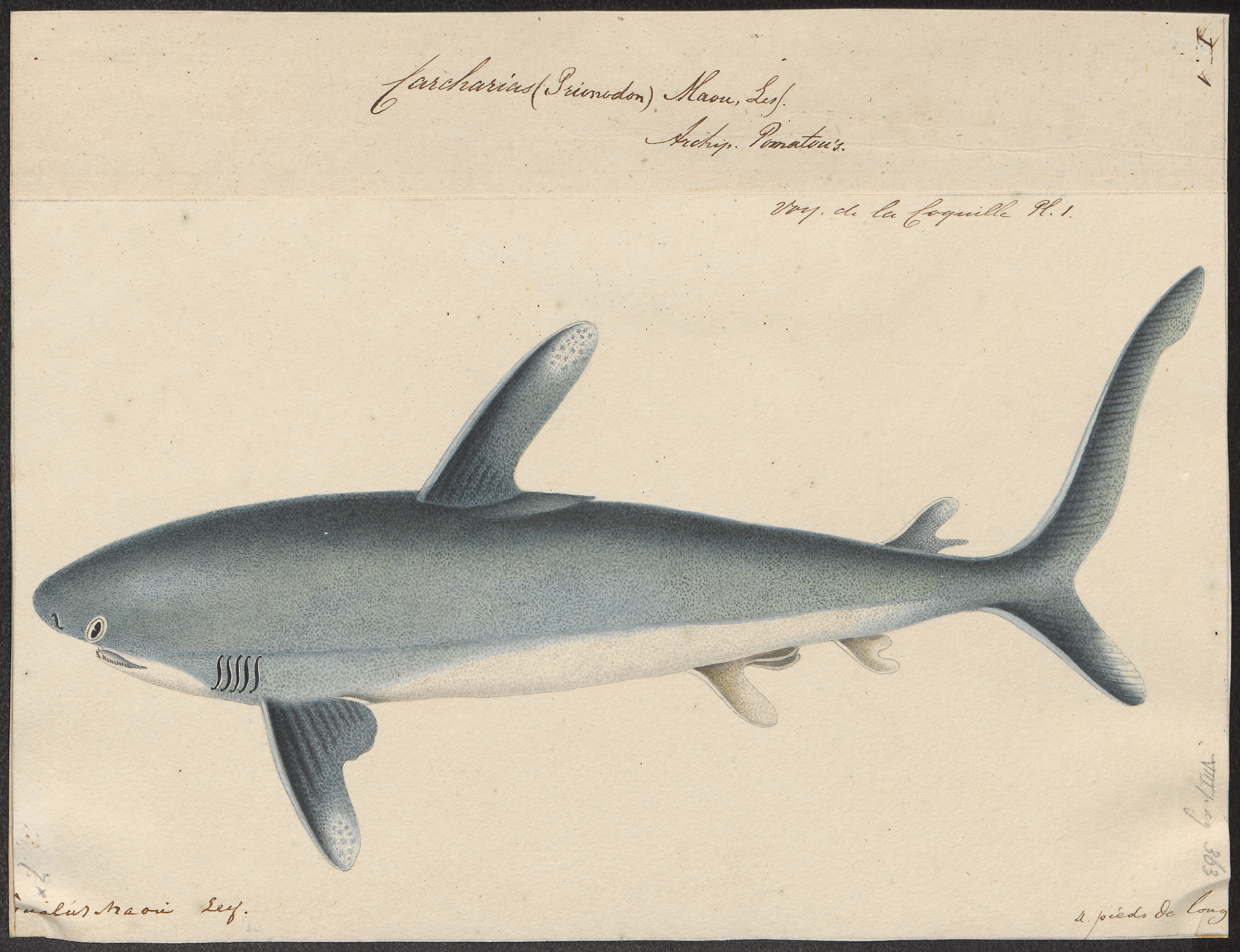
Illustration of "Carcharias maou"

Until the 16th century, sharks were known to mariners as "sea dogs" and the oceanic whitetip the most common ship-following shark. Oceanographic researcher Jacques Cousteau described the oceanic whitetip as "the most dangerous of all sharks". Author and big-game fisherman Ernest Hemingway depicted them as aggressive opportunists that attacked the catch of fishermen in The Old Man and the Sea, which may be based on Hemingway's experience fishing from his boat, the Pilar.

During World War II, the RMS Nova Scotia, a steamship carrying about 1,000 people near South Africa, was sunk by a German submarine in the morning of 28 November 1942. One hundred and ninety-two people survived; many deaths were attributed to the whitetip. Later in the war, the USS Indianapolis was torpedoed on 30 July 1945. Some sailors who survived the sinking reportedly died from exposure to the elements, while some died from shark attacks, per the eyewitness report of those who survived the night.

Whitetip shark swimming near a diver, Red Sea

Subsequently, the species is recorded to have attacked 21 people between 1955 and 2020, including nine divers, eight swimmers, two fishermen, one shipwrecked person and one fallen pilot. Five of these attacks were fatal. In 2010, one oceanic whitetip was implicated in several bites on tourists in the Red Sea near Sharm El Sheikh, Egypt, resulting in four injuries to humans. Accumulating evidence revealed this shark to have been conditioned to being hand fed. In October 2019, an oceanic whitetip shark attacked a female snorkeler off Mo'orea, French Polynesia, but the person survived. Based on eyewitness reports and examinations of the bites, the shark appears to have been acting like a predator attacking prey.

The oceanic whitetip has been kept in captivity. Among five recorded captive oceanic whitetips, the three with time records all lived for more than a year in captivity. One of these, a female in Monterey Bay Aquarium's Outer-Bay exhibit, lived for more than three years before dying in 2003, during which it grew 0.3 m (1 ft). The two remaining lack a time record, but grew about 0.5 m (1.6 ft) during their time in captivity.

== Conservation status ==
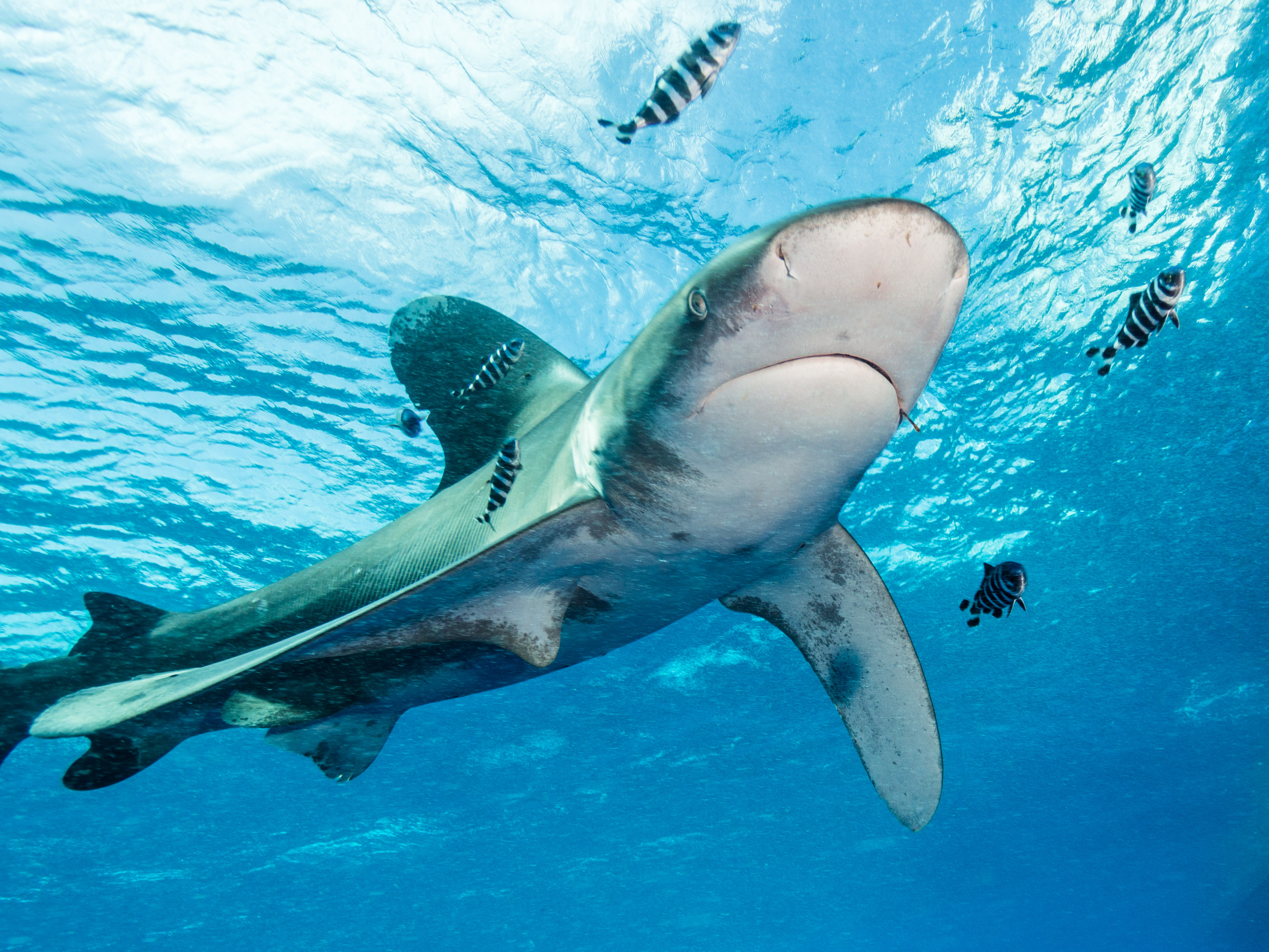
Whitetip with a rusted fish hook in its mouth

Oceanic whitetip sharks are mainly threatened by fisheries, sometimes intentional but usually as bycatch. They are victims of longlines, hook-lines, gillnets and trawls. The sharks are used for their fins and meat. It is eaten fresh, smoked, dried, or salted, and its skin made into leather. Bycatching of oceanic whitetip sharks may be reduced by removing hooks from longliners when they are in shallow water. This species may also be threatened by pollution; sharks in the northwest Atlantic have been found to accumulate high amounts of mercury.

As of 2019, the IUCN Red List list the oceanic whitetip shark as critically endangered, as their numbers appear to have decreased in every ocean region they inhabit. While their total global population is unknown, they are estimated to have declined by around 98 percent "with the highest probability of >80% reduction over three generation lengths (61.2 years)".

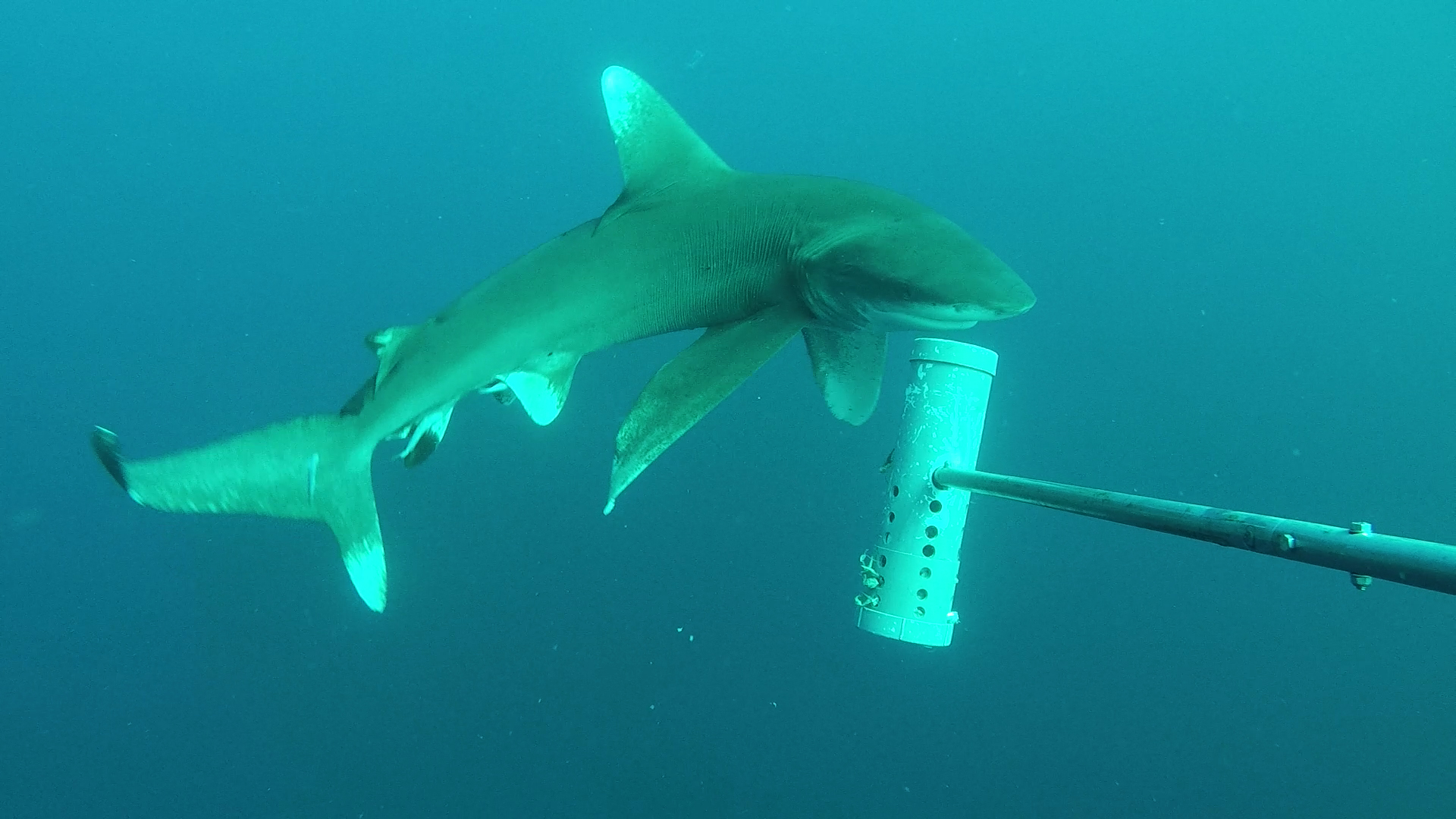
Whitetip examining the bait canister of a BRUVS

In 1969, Lineaweaver and Backus wrote of the oceanic whitetip: "[it is] extraordinarily abundant, perhaps the most abundant large animal, large being over 100 lb (45 kg), on the face of the earth". A study focusing on the northwest Atlantic and Gulf of Mexico, using a mix of data from US pelagic longline surveys from the mid-1950s and observations from the late 1990s, estimated a decline in numbers in this location of 99.3% over this period. However, changes in fishing practices and data collection methods complicate estimates. According to a January 2021 study in Nature which studied 31 species of sharks and rays including the oceanic whitetip, the number of these species found in open oceans had dropped by 71 per cent in around 50 years.

In March 2013, the oceanic whitetip was added to Appendix II of CITES, which means the species (including parts and derivatives) require CITES permits for international trade. On 30 January 2018, NOAA Fisheries published a final rule to list the oceanic whitetip shark as a threatened species under the United States Endangered Species Act (ESA) (83 FR 4153). From 3 January 2013, the shark was fully protected in New Zealand territorial waters under the Wildlife Act 1953. The New Zealand Department of Conservation has classified the oceanic whitetip shark as "Migrant" with the qualifier "Secure Overseas" under the New Zealand Threat Classification System.

On November 27, 2025, CITES CoP20 Parties voted to uplist oceanic whitetip sharks to Appendix I, which, as the highest level of protection offered by CITES, generally prohibits international commercial trade in the species. Eighty-three percent of the vote at CoP20 was in favor of the listing.

== See also ==
- List of sharks
- List of threatened sharks
- Outline of sharks
