= List of Skippy the Bush Kangaroo episodes =

This is the list of episodes for the original Skippy the Bush Kangaroo series, aired from 1968 to 1970.

It has been difficult to determine a proper order for Skippy episodes. The official numbering has many anomalies. The airdate order is also difficult to obtain, as the series was screened in a completely different sequence in different cities.

== Season 1 (1968) ==
No.	Title
Pilot	"Man From Space"
Skippy and Sonny come across an injured airman hanging by the cord of his parachute from a tree. Realising that the weight of his body is ripping the parachute and that it is only a matter of time before he falls to his death, Sonny sends Skippy for help. This pilot was later aired as episode 36 during season 1.
1	"The Poachers"
Sonny, Mark and Jerry investigate an expensive game fishing cruiser with three men aboard after Skippy and Sonny come across men trapping animals at night. Swimming out to the cruiser, Jerry finds out that they are collecting animals for Dr. Stark's private zoo.
2	"Sports Car Rally"
There is a rally going through the park and animals are in danger of being run over. There are also branches blocking the road and avoiding them, the car is turned upside down and the driver is pinned under the car which is on the edge of the cliff. It's up to Skippy to deliver the message from Sonny to Matt and then Jerry and Mark are needed with the chopper and a grappling hook to pull the car off the driver. However when lowering the hook, it gets caught around a tree and again Skippy is the only one able to release the hook.
3	"The Golden Reef"
Skin diving geologists find alluvial gold. Thieves move in with spear guns, and once again, Matt, Sonny, and Skippy are there to stop them.
4	"Long Way Home"
Skippy is in trouble when she is kidnapped by Dr. Alexander Stark who wants her in his zoo, after Matt refuses to sell her, Skippy escapes, but can she find her way home?
5	"Cage Of Koalas"
Matt Hammond is annoyed and angry when research scientist, Dr. Anna Steiner starts trapping koalas in the Waratah National Park. But he has to put his personal feelings aside, when she gets into trouble.
6	"The Lyre Bird"
Sonny makes a new friend, Lisa, who is a ballerina. Together they find an aged botanist, and bring about his rescue.
7	"Dead Or Alive"
A mysterious disease threatens to wipe out all wildlife in Waratah National Park and the evidence is Skippy is to blame. Sonny is heartbroken at the thought of losing Skippy and after releasing her, Sonny finds a poacher and his dogs who are the real cause of the problem.
8	"The Marine Biologist"
Mark is unhappy when Matt asks him to accompany a Marine biologist. But his misery turns to delight when he discovers the biologist is a spunky young woman with whom he falls completely in love with immediately. They find themselves having to rescue Skippy and Sonny from an out-of-control speedboat.
9	"No Time For Clancy"
Clancy's father, Tom Merrick, is moving his family as he is going to be the Head Ranger of a new park. Matt offers to take in Clancy, so she can finish her school exams and then join them. What they don't know yet is, Clancy likes to play the piano, early in the morning!
10	"Time And Tide"
Clancy loses Dr. Anna Steiner's camera after a spider jumps onto her and startles her. After going into the water to search for it, she gets her foot stuck under a rock. The tide starts rising, and it's up to Jerry and Mark to rescue Clancy.
11	"Can You Keep A Secret?"
Sonny is bored and goes to his secret cave with Clancy. But when they get there, there is an escaped convict waiting for them, who holds Clancy hostage. He forces Sonny to get food and clothes for him. Later, when the convict tries to escape from the park, in the boat, he takes Sonny as a hostage, and it's up to Skippy to rescue Sonny.
12	"The Swagman"
Sonny meets an Irish swagman, Mr. Trundle, and has a difficult time believing that the stories he tells Sonny are lies. The pocketwatch that he owns is believed to be stolen and the police are after him. It later turns out that Miles Vincent Archer and Mr. Trundle are the same person.
13	"The Honeymooners"
A millionaire and his wife are in their boat in the park and the wife aims to have Skippy's coat for her collection. Sonny is trapped, locked in the boat, Skippy knocks the couple into the water and it's up to Skippy to save Sonny before the boat crashes.
14	"Many Happy Returns"
It's Sonny's birthday, and he wishes to learn to fly the chopper. After he leaves, Mark is sick in his stomach because of food poisoning from eating fish. Jerry receives the same pain soon after. It's up to Sonny to fly the chopper, and Jim Ferguson to help Sonny land it and give Jerry the medication he needs.
15	"My Best Friend"
Sonny has to paint a painting for school. But when it's finished, Clancy and Mark think that his painting is terrible and wanted him to get a good mark in class. so they substitute his with their own each in turn. First Mark, then Clancy.
16	"When The Bough Breaks"
A couple are out on the lake canoeing when their baby rolls down the shore and into the water. When the baby is rescued by Skippy, she goes to find Sonny to pick up the baby.
17	"The Waratah Festival"
A diamond thief loses a valuable necklace while on the run from the police in the park. The thief sees Skippy find it and places it in her pouch, and follows her back to Ranger Headquarters where everyone is busy constructing a float for the Waratah Festival. The thief stows away on the float and Mark and Sonny start fighting the thief, and they win the fight and the trophy.
18	"Summer Storm"
When a storm hits the Waratah National Park, the communication lines go down. What makes matters worse is that Matt is bitten by a snake and with the radios out no one can radio for help. It is up to Skippy to go for help and the antidote to save Matt's life.
19	"The Rustlers"
Skippy interrupts Sonny's radio lesson to show Sonny shearers rustling sheep who con Sonny into working for them.
20	"Double Trouble"
Still determined to have Skippy in his Zoo, Doctor Alexander Stark hires an actor to pose as a Park Ranger, and tries to get Matt fired from his job as Head Ranger.
21	"Trapped"
Dr. Stark sends an operative into the park to collect a rare ant eating specimen, using a gas emitting camera. Clancy stumbles across the collector and is temporarily paralysed by the device. Skippy returns a cassette back to Ranger headquarters leading to the thief's capture and Clancy's safe return.
22	"They're Singing Me Back"
Sonny comes across an Aboriginal woman, Noonar who has run away from her tribe and says they're "singing her back". As her tribe searches for her, she becomes more and more agitated. Noonar, is a very talented singer who wants to become a professional singer. Matt tries to help her by giving her clothes and accommodation, but her life and sleep are still disturbed. She gives in to the tribal elder when he wants to make an exchange for Sonny. He then relents when Matt negotiates with him about the benefits that each other can learn from one another.
23	"Tara - Part One"
Sonny and Skippy discover the hidden entrance to a remote valley thought to be uninhabited. There, Sonny makes friends with an old aboriginal, who lives alone. One day Sonny finds Tara weak, in a Semi Coma and that he has been visited by a "Death Spirit" and he is about to die.
24	"Tara - Part Two"
Matt locates Judd, the man whose life Tara saved, hoping he will bring in people from Tara's tribe who will have the ability to free Tara from death.
25	"Surf King"
At a beach (not Bondi), Jerry wants to win the Championship, but instead swims out to rescue a trapped swimmer. While back at the Waratah National Park, Clancy and Matt have to fight a fire before it gets out of control.
26	"The Runaway"
A young runaway holds Mark and Jerry at gunpoint demanding to be flown out of the park. Skippy leaps to the rescue and the boy flees on foot only to go over a ravine. Jerry risks his life to save for the boy who would rather fall to his death than accept help.
27	"The Last Chance"
An ageing film star attempts a comeback on a new movie being filmed in the Park. When Skippy inserts herself into a scene a new star is born-much to the annoyance of the leading man who tries to have Skippy "taken care of".
28	"No Trespassers"
Skippy stumbles upon a secret boxing training camp illegally set up in Waratah National Park. A young boxer, Rocky Miller, takes a forbidden joy ride in the chopper with Jerry and a forced landing has surprise results. Guest stars Jimmy Carruthers and Chips Rafferty.
29	"Mayday - Part One"
Jerry breaks Waratah National Park regulations when a chopper flight is the only way he can keep a date with his girlfriend Barbara "Babs" Mason. A dramatic crash results and it's Skippy to the rescue.
30	"Mayday - Part Two (aka Where There's Smoke)"
Two crash detectives investigate Jerry's helicopter accident and are unable to substantiate his story of going off course to check on a bushfire. Skippy and Sonny head off to find the evidence needed to clear Jerry of the charges. Meanwhile, Jerry hands in his resignation, effective immediately.
31	"Date In Dalmar"
With Sonny as hostage and a rifle pointed at Matt's head, bank robber Keeler forces Matt to drive him from Waratah National Park to keep his rendezvous with his accomplices.
32	"Ten Little Visitors"
Sonny and Skippy become guides for foreign children stopping at Waratah National Park while touring Australia.
33	"The Empty Chair"
Sonny travels to Sydney to persuade his friend Mr. Trundle (Alias Miles Vincent Archer) to return temporarily to his desk as chairman of a vast corporation and reverse the board's decision to despoil Waratah National Park by drilling for oil.
34	"Aunt Evelyn"
When Aunt Evelyn comes to Waratah National Park determined to persuade Matt that he should put Sonny in boarding school in Sydney, Sonny and Skippy save her from death by drowning and Sonny is saved from a fate he'd consider worse than death.
35	"The Bushrangers"
Alone at Ranger Headquarters, Jerry is overpowered by burglars who take everything movable. Later Sonny and Skippy come across a group wearing Ned Kelly Armour entering a cave. Sonny suspects they are the burglars but they turn out to be a pop group, "The Bushrangers", who have set up their instruments in the Park after being driven from their town by neighbours complaining about the noise. The group eventually help catch the burglars after a mud fight.
36	"Man From Space"
Sonny has been placed in charge of an automatic recording unit deep in the bush of Waratah National Park, supervised by Matt. While servicing the box, Skippy and Sonny come across an injured airman who has ejected from his plane, hanging by the cord of his parachute from a tree. In trying to rescue him, Sonny slips and becomes trapped on a cliff face. Realising that the weight of his body is ripping the parachute and that it is only a matter of time before he falls to his death, Sonny sends Skippy for help. who returns with Matt and who rescues Sonny, with help from Jerry and Mark in the chopper as well.
37	"Be Our Guest"
Thrown from her horse deep in the bush of Waratah National park, Clancy is hopelessly lost, and her mother is due at Ranger Headquarters to see how Matt has been looking after her. A band of Aboriginal Nomads finds Clancy and brings her back to headquarters, just in time.
38	"The Long Night"
A pair of industrial spies on the trail of a roll of secret microfilm, masquerade as detectives and try to cover their tracks by accusing Mark of a hit and run accident. Only Skippy is aware of their true identities.
39	"View Matt"
Overhearing Dr. Morton that Matt ought to marry again, Sonny tries his hand at matchmaking, when he answers lonely hearts advertisements in Matt's name. Asking Clancy's advice, Sonny types out an answer and sends in Matt's Photograph. However, Jerry manages a switch and gives Mr. Stubbs Matt's uniform and identity which suits the lady.

== Season 2 (1968-1969) ==
No.	Title
40	"The Raft"
Sonny rescues a boy who has run away from home. When they paddle down the river on Sonny's raft, and it falls apart, the boy admits he can't swim. His father rescues him, and Sonny sees the father as a hero for a moment.
41	"The Perfect Hosts"
A case of mistaken identity for an armed robber leads Sonny and Clancy to tie up a Very Important Person in knots - literally.
42	"Honest Jack"
Sonny finds a man chopping down trees in the Park and when he tells him it is illegal, the man says he owns the land. It transpires that "Honest Jack" has been selling blocks of land in Waratah National Park. For his final scam, he tries to sell off Ranger Headquarters as an "ideal home". Guest star John Laws.
43	"Follow My Leader"
A spoiled young violin prodigy, a friend of Clancy's insists on acquiring a baby koala, but Skippy saves him from losing his life in the process.
44	"Tex N. Ranger"
A school for stuntmen moves into Waratah National Park, and Skippy saves their injured teacher. Guest star Tom Oliver.
45	"Chicken"
Sonny discovers two dead possums in their tree trunk home and Matt is disturbed by the number of animals that have died. Skippy is poisoned and nearly dies. Matt tricks the culprit into revealing his guilt and the location of the poison.
46	"Belinda"
A beautiful thoroughbred mare has escaped from the men who have stolen her. Following Sonny and Skippy, the horse finds refuge at Waratah National Park Ranger Headquarters. The thieves attempt to recapture the horse three times but each time it escapes. On the final attempt, the real owner turns up with papers of ownership, and the horse is rescued just in time from the thieves. Guest star Ross Higgins.
47	"The Mine"
Matt is expecting a visit by a man to assist with blowing up an abandoned mine. The man turns out to be Matt's old Army buddy, Toby Boughton. Later, following an accidental detonation caused by a wombat, Matt and Toby are trapped in the mine and it is slowly filling with water. Matt sends Clancy for the doctor and Skippy for help. Guest stars Chuck Faulkner and Harold Hopkins.
48	"Rockslide"
A Young National Service deserter risks recapture to look after Sonny, who has been injured in a rockslide. Guest star Sandy Harbutt.
49	"Hide and Seek"
Clancy notices someone lurking near the helicopter hangar, and Mark and Jerry go to investigate. Jerry is astounded to find someone he has known since childhood. His friend, Rich, involved in an armed robbery and with a bloodied bandage around his head, convinces Jerry he is innocent and asks for refuge in Waratah National Park. Jerry refuses and his friend won't listen. It's up to Skippy to save the day and find Rich.
50	"Flying Saucers"
After saving up to buy a camera and film, Sonny and Skippy see a flying saucer. Sonny takes a photograph of it, but loses the photograph. Matt, Jerry and Mark don't believe him, but Clancy does. While Sonny is away with Matt, Clancy answers the phone and tells a couple of people about the flying saucer, and it snowballs. Skippy finds the photograph and Matt, Jerry and Mark looks at it. Skippy goes searching for the truth and Matt finds the answer to Sonny's flying saucer. It turns out to be an experimental weather balloon.
51	"Esmeralda"
An old gypsy woman, wanting retribution for the imprisonment of her sons, takes revenge on Matt, Sonny and Mark in a way that proves more embarrassing than harmful. Even Skippy is powerless to prevent the trick. When Clancy goes looking for them, it is to everyone's relief that there is a tape recording of the explosion, rather than a real one. Guest star Neva Carr Glyn.
52	"Puppets"
When Sonny follows Skippy, he discovers a young puppeteer. Mark later discovers the same man. Steven, who lives with his uncle Carl, won't let him be a puppeteer. When there is a fundraiser for the RSPCA, and Steven is asked to use the puppets, he is told to leave by his uncle, and it is up to Skippy to save the day. Matt has a word to Carl that it would be better if he was proud of his nephew rather than jealous of him, and both Carl and Steven perform with their puppets in the show. (Puppets by Norman Hetherington.)
53	"Vice Versa"
Sir Adrian comes to the park, for Professor Clifton, and the Park Trust has given permission, wanting to take Skippy away to Sydney to study her for 6 to 9 months. Sonny concocts a plan to have Skippy pretend to act dumb, doing the opposite of what she's told.
54	"Oats"
An aggressive National Parks Inspector is determined to make everyone at Ranger Headquarters jump, but through his own uncontrollable fear in a crisis, he learns to respect the others.
55	"The Black Spider"
While Sonny is reading a book called "The Black Spider". Clancy's music teacher Miss Masters turns up at Ranger Headquarters and tells Matt about Clancy's absence from lessons and loss of interest in music. Mark suggests to Sonny Clancy is leading a double life or worse she is in the clutches of "The Black Spider". Something is bothering Clancy but she won't tell anyone what it is. Sonny sneaks into Clancy's room, and finds out what her letter says. When Matt later drops her off in Sydney, and watches her leave the Conservatorium of Music, he follows her to see what is going on. Sonny and Skippy make a trap, but end up catching Mark instead! It turns out that Clancy is helping Sonny with his lessons and Mark switched Clancy's mother's letter. And that Clancy could win a scholarship.
56	"Tread Softly"
Finding a koala, Skippy helps it but it falls into a hole. Matt and Mark rescue the koala. More traps are found by Jerry. Skippy finds the culprit, and follows him. It turns out that a friend of Ben Schyler is responsible, and is paying him for it. Getting trapped, Matt is caught in one but Sir Adrian comes to his rescue. Skippy is also trapped in a hole and Schyler's dog is missing and blames Matt. Schuyler's wife leaves him and when he finds his dog is missing, he goes looking for him, and is caught by one of his own traps. Then Sonny appears with Skippy and Schuyler's dog, being friends.
57	"Shark Taggers"
Sonny notices a diver, Paula Howard, who is a shark researcher in the lake, which is shark infested. Going to watch her with the binoculars, Sonny and Skippy help her research work on sharks in the dinghy with her. On one of her dives, she cuts herself. While trying to escape one of the sharks, the dinghy is overturned and Sonny and Skippy fall into the water. Skippy swims past the sharks and locates help, and Sonny struggles to keep her out of the water. Jerry and Mark leave in the chopper and Matt and Skippy in the car. Only the last minute arrival of Jerry and Mark in the Ranger chopper can save them from a school of maneaters. After she is rescued, Sonny falls in the water while being rescued and is nearly eaten by sharks but the chopper scares them away and Matt comes to his rescue.
58	"Surprise, Surprise"
It's Clancy's birthday and she thinks everyone has forgotten her special day. But unbeknownst to her there is a surprise party in store for her. But she has to be away until 4 o'clock. And Mark unfortunately has forgotten to invite any girls to the party. Having problems finding girls and not knowing what to do, Mark decides to drive the car into Sydney with Sonny and Skippy to see if Betsy can help. But it turns out Skippy is the answer to Mark's prayers, as half a dozen girls like Skippy. Meanwhile the Ranger Patrol Boat is out of action with a broken propeller after Clancy's accident, and Matt and Clancy are forced to walk back to Ranger Headquarters. "Lucky" Johnson picks them up on the way so that they don't have to walk the rest of the way.
59	"Marco Polo"
Mark wants to go around the world with his friend Bob. But Matt refuses to give him permission. However, on a psychology suggestion from Jerry, Matt decides to go along with it. When Mark and his mate try to ride the tandem bicycle, they have a puncture then a collision with a stick buckles the front wheel. Bob's father changes his mind and Mark decides to let Sonny come with him when he is old enough, rather than go alone.
60	"Wombat"
Sonny finds an orphaned baby wombat and not finding its parents, brings it back to Ranger Headquarters where havoc ensues when Mark tries to recapture it. Skippy finds its mother and Sonny gets her out and reunites mother and baby.
61	"Axeman"
A man mistakenly chops down trees thinking it is crown land. The man is a professional axeman, and two koalas, a mother and baby, are in the tree. However since the park needs a new helipad for the chopper, he is given permission to cut down the required area of trees for the helipad. However, two men don't want him chopping in the show. Skippy shows the broken distributor to Jerry and Jim Roberts is flown to the show in Jerry's chopper, after which he wins the chopping contest. Guest star Reg Gorman.
62	"Up and Beyond"
A man and a woman have to parachute from a balloon when it tears. Skippy sees it and shows Sonny. The balloonists make their way to Ranger Park Headquarters after landing. Meanwhile Sonny and Skippy are in the Balloon Basket, and Sonny accidentally turns on the burner. Matt, Jerry, Mark and the two balloonists try to bring it down with the drag rope that is hanging from the balloon but fail. Matt grabs it after giving chase in the patrol boat, but lands in the water. Jerry and Mark and one of the balloonists fly after it in the chopper. Locating the balloon, Mark climbs down the ladder with a grappling hook but that fails. Sonny puts on the parachute, and jumps with Skippy and is picked up by Matt.
63	"Round-Up"
Skippy discovers wild horses in the park and the horses damage vegetation in the park when Matt, Jerry and Mark try to capture them on a day that scientists are to examine the vegetation, so Matt hires rodeo champions to round them up. When the horses go into hiding and most of the rodeo riders leave to go to the rodeo, Matt, Clancy and Pete round them up by themselves. Pete's brother Cole comes back and Sonny and Skippy lead him to the horses.
64	"The Hikers"
Two teachers of botany and nature studies, Helen Macauley and Judith Wright, go hiking through the bush. They meet Sonny and Skippy. Sonny is worried about them getting lost going to Mt. Lofty so he goes to find Matt, and asks Skippy to keep an eye on them. Matt isn't at Ranger Headquarters, so he tells Jerry. Jerry finds Skippy who shows him the way to the teachers. Jerry advises them of a better route but they ignore him. Skippy follows them and Judith falls over and the compass is damaged. Judith blames Skippy for their bad luck. Judith is bitten by a snake and Skippy takes the snake to Jerry, who is able to identify that it is harmless. Skippy shows Jerry where the teachers are and are able to allay their fears. Guest stars Pat Lovell and Clarissa Kaye.
65	"For My Next Trick"
Sonny and Skippy spot a travelling showman, Alfred the Great, and his partner. They want to stay in the park. Sonny and Skippy show them the way to the place set aside for camping. They give a private performance for Sonny and Skippy. They use Skippy in their disappearing act, then use an excuse to get rid of Sonny then leave with Skippy. Skippy pretends to be dead then escapes. The kidnappers try to chase Skippy down. The animals help Skippy and they chase the kidnappers. Guest star Barry Crocker.
66	"A Bird In The Hand"
Mark spots a man up a tree, who claims is a birdwatcher. He is capturing birds, and putting them in a bag, and selling them. Jerry has to meet an ornithologist who is a nun. Sonny and Skippy discover the birds stolen, from the Quarantine area and are put into bags by the thieves. Skippy escapes to tell Matt who tells Jerry. The thieves are captured by the nun and Jerry. Guest stars Kirrily Nolan, Ken Shorter, and Henri Szeps.
67	"Marathon"
Sir Adrian Gillespie has given permission for the athletics association use the park for a cross country marathon. Mark wants to run but Matt doesn't think he can last the distance. After visiting Ranger Headquarters, Mr. Hogan accidentally knocks one of the signs the wrong way. When Mark comes to the signpost, he goes the right way while every one else goes the wrong way. Skippy wins the race and Mark doesn't get a trophy and declares that was his last marathon he'll run. Guest stars Willie Fennell and Harry Lawrence.
68	"The Best Man"
When Jerry is asked to be best man at a wedding, he finds it hard to make it to the church on time. First he has to round up two youths on the river in a boat. Then he has to rescue a man caught on a ledge. There are no cars available as everyone seems to be out so Jerry has to ride a horse to the wedding. He leaves his hat and gloves behind but Skippy arrives with his hat and gloves.
69	"Plain Jane"
A plain shy country girl, Jane Holland, who has led a very sheltered life is transformed into a beauty much to the amazement of Jerry and Mark. Jane gets sick when Mark takes her out in the boat with Sonny and Clancy. Mark invites her to a party but Jerry doesn't want her to come. Clancy's friend Georgie helps Jane out and she becomes instantly popular.
70	"Hi Fi"
On a rainy day, while Sonny is visiting Aunt Evelyn, Mark is trying to assemble a hi-fi set. Stan Wiley and Matt leave to put up temporary phone line. While Matt is installing the line, Stan Wiley goes to the mine, on the way and finds the bridge is near collapse. A storm short circuits the communication system. Skippy and Clancy head off to try and warn Matt. Mark gets his hi-fi working just in time and Skippy arrives in time to stop Matt driving onto the bridge.
71	"Maggie"
While Matt, Mark and Sonny are away, a loveable, zany girlfriend of Jerry's finds herself embroiled with smugglers and turns to Jerry for help. The smugglers hold Jerry and Maggie at gunpoint and Skippy alerts the police.
72	"Mixed Company"
An elderly ornithologist is determined to prevent a group of young waterskiers using the river because they disturb his birdwatching. While attempting to sabotage the youths' boat, the ornithologist accidentally knocks over a jerrycan, starting a fire which threatens the animals of Waratah National Park. The animals are rescued, the fire is put out, and the ornithologist apologises to the youths.
73	"Treasure Hunt"
There's been a bank robbery, and the thieves have hidden their loot in Matt's truck. By coincidence, there is a treasure hunt going on and they've put $8000 in the chest of the treasure hunt. While Matt, Jerry, Clancy are away, the thieves arrive at Ranger Headquarters and Sonny tells them about the treasure hunt. The thieves go through the different clues to find the treasure chest in which they've hidden their loot and end up tripping over Clancy's dress.
74	"The Sport of Kings"
Mark is to ride in a horse race at Royal Randwick, and Matt, Sonny, Clancy and Skippy are attending with Sir Adrian. When the horse Stormaway knocks Mark over in a horse float and he hits his head, he is injured, and Clancy takes his place. Skippy bets $1 on "Wallaby Bill" and collects $34. Stormaway starts badly but makes up ground and wins the race. But Stormaway is disqualified. Skippy shows off her winnings.
75	"Bon Voyage"
Years of practising the piano have paid off as Clancy passes her music examinations. She also wins a Randolf Scholarship to study music in London. Her parents come to collect her. but her parents can't afford to fly her to London for the scholarship and accommodation. Sir Adrian and Mr. Neilson from England need Matt to send his best Ranger to England on an exchange program. So Matt sends Clancy's father so that Clancy can study music in England, and the whole family move to England. This is the last appearance of Liza Goddard as Clancy.
76	"Cobber"
Toby Bell and his dog, Cobber are at war with Joe Farrell and his dog, Judy. They both used to be best friends. Skippy tells Matt and Sonny about Joe stealing Toby's dog. And Toby, Matt and Sonny follow Skippy. Skippy outsmarts Joe and makes him crash his truck by forcing it off the road. Matt stages an impromptu sheep dog trial to end a hostile rift between two old, hard-headed bushmen, Toby Bell and Joe Farrell over a sheep dog named Cobber. Matt says they should go into partnership together. Sonny says that Skippy says they should let the dogs decide. And Toby and Joe win best sheep dog trial together at the sheep show thanks to Cobber.
77	"Tiger"
Mark and Mr. Crompton are photographing animals drinking at the waterhole and after developing them, a tiger is discovered. Matt says that it is too small to be a tiger but may be a Tasmanian Tiger. Matt calls Dr. Tollkine, an expert on animals. While Mark is developing his photos, Sonny finds the tracks and Skippy finds some screwed up photos which he gives to Mark. After Matt takes Dr. Tollkine to see Mr. Crompton, and leaves them, it appears that they are both imposters and con men. Mark is suspicious and it seems the men are capturing animals and putting them in cages. Sonny sees the tiger. which is later revealed to be a dog with painted stripes on it. When they attempt to escape, Matt stops them, and tells Mark and Sonny that he rang up and checked.
78	"Luna Park"
Sonny wins a competition and the prize is a trip to Luna Park. Mark takes Sonny and Skippy and leaves them there to come back at 5 O'Clock. While Sonny and Skippy are on the Ferry to the Park, a man, Nimble Norris, steals someone's wallet, and escaping, he jumps onto the ferry where he meets Sonny and Skippy. Before he is arrested by the police, he puts the wallet into Skippy's pouch. When Mark arrives to pick Sonny and Skippy up, the police arrest Nimble Norris. Guest star John Meillon.

== Season 3 (1970) ==
No.	Title
79	"A Work Of Art"
An eccentric artist, Mr. Nash, comes to Waratah National Park to paint the wildlife. He complains to Matt that someone has vandalised his paintings and Sonny is out looking for Skippy. After catching Skippy he is at first angry with him, but then becomes friends. After "painting" on his canvas, Skippy poses for him. Later a well-known politician, a senator and his wife come to the park to buy one of the paintings. Skippy comes back to Ranger headquarters and shows them where Mr. Nash is hiding. After a short argument the painting is sold and the cheque made out to Waratah National Park.
80	"A Manner Of Speaking"
When a new girl, Theresa, comes to the area, Mark tries to make friends with her but finds her father, Mr. Fiorini is unwilling to allow it. Mark then makes an effort to learn their language, Italian, but struggles, Mr. Fiorini calling him "crazy". Matt catches Mr. Fiorini going to shoot some animals and takes him to see Mark to translate the park rules of no shooting animals, but to no avail. When Mr. Fiorini tries to climb a tree to catch a couple of koalas, he falls and breaks his leg and it's up to Skippy to get help. Mr. Fiorini gives permission for Mark to see Theresa in gratitude and gives everyone a big spaghetti dinner at his home. And it turns out Matt is very good at Italian.
81	"The Prince Of Siam"
After Matt says to Sonny that there are a lot of children in the world that don't have enough food to eat, after he throws an apple away, Sonny decides to raise money for charity and Matt says he'll match it. He gets a job on a tomato farm to raise money for a children's charity. When his employer's beloved Siamese cat, Sammy, is lost for four days, Skippy finds the cat – and collects the reward of $200.
82	"High Fashion"
Skippy and Sonny are helping Mark fix the 4WD and Matt asks Mark to show some fashion people around. As they are finishing the photography session, the photographer asks for filters and as Sonny is bringing them, he trips over a rock and all of the filters spill out, cracked and ruined. Mark goes to new ones and the photographer decides to shoot black and white pictures and as the model leans her arm across a rock, Skippy tries to warn her and the photographer but the photographer tells Skippy to go away and she is bitten by a spider. Sonny takes charge of the situation and Skippy takes a message written by Sonny to Matt and Mark and the spider bite is identified to be non poisonous. Guest star Jack Thompson.
83	"El Toro"
A man called Gus brings a bull named Brutus into the Park, but Brutus is stung by an echidna. The bull then goes on a rampage, disturbing and terrorizing numerous other campers, and Sonny and Skippy search for the campers to warn them of the Bull. Matt says later if they hadn't run from the bull he wouldn't have done anything, as he was frightened. Guest stars Michael Caton and Maggie Dence.
84	"Mr. Duffy"
Sonny is tidying up his room and an Irishman, Patrick Duffy turns up. He claims to be a cobbler. While Sonny is getting permission from Matt to repair his shoes, he disappears. He then turns up speaking to Mark, and Mark's shoes just happen to suddenly have holes in them. As Mark is leaving, without explanation it suddenly rains and the man disappears again. Meanwhile Matt is also puzzled by the sudden downpour. And Sonny receives a brand new pair of shoes without any explanation to his amazement. Later, when Sonny finds him, he claims to be able to talk to animals. When Mark tells Matt his name is Mr. Duffy, Matt says he thinks he might know him. Skippy meanwhile, finds aboriginal art in a cave behind a waterfall. It turns out that Mr. Duffy has been painting fraudulent paintings. Finally, Matt himself has holes in his shoes.
85	"The Medicine Man"
Sonny is ill, and Matt asks a neighbour, Joe Hogan, to get some cough medicine for him. All of the animals in the park come to visit Sonny. The neighbour agrees as he is going to get some medicine for his horse (which he accidentally gives to Matt). He decides to get a home remedy instead of going to the chemist. A stubborn Sonny doesn't want the medicine, which gives the neighbour enough time to return and swap them back. Meanwhile, Mark has problems evicting Sonny's visitors.
86	"The Veteran"
A red MG convertible is abandoned when Matt finds it on the side of the road. Matt finds the man, struggles with him, is overpowered, and then knocked to the ground unconscious. After Matt regains consciousness, he radios Mark and asks him to put out a yellow alert for him. The man nearly kills Sonny, speeding. The police later turn up at Ranger Headquarters with the man's wife. It is revealed the man, Steven Lansbury, was a prisoner of war. Matt then asks Mark to put out a red alert for him as he has got Sonny. The man steals a plane, and when the engine cuts out, he lands it, thinking he is in Burma.
87	"The Rainmakers"
There is a severe shortage of rain in the park, and Mr. Pearson has arrived to inform Matt about activating rainclouds. Matt and Mark meet an aboriginal backpacker, an artist Johnny Bombada. Mr. Bombada, Mr. Pennyweather, and Mr. Pearson all claim to have caused the rain. When the rain becomes too much, Matt demands that someone turn it off, and Johnny Bombada does so, successfully. Guest stars Athol Compton, Rod Hull, and Noel Ferrier.
88	"Up The Waratahs"
It's the final of Mark's football team against the Koalas. Two criminals are looking for a way to put Mark out of the game so that they can collect on a bet against the Waratahs. They use Nimble Norris for their dirty work and try threatening him, but fail.
89	"Merry-Go-Round"
Carrie Mason, a girl who wants nothing in the world but to be a clown, finds she has much in common with Skippy when they both decide to run away from home, and join an itinerant carnival. Guest star Peter Adams.
90	"Pigeon Pair"
Skippy and Sonny find a device which they think is a bomb, but is a pigeon racing clock. When they take it back to the owner, they find that there are two people competing in the National Pigeon Racing Championships. The owner of the racing clock, Miss Dougall's "Penelope" comes second with help from Skippy. Colonel Crothers, retired, wins with "Sergeant".
91	"Fred"
Sir Adrian, Mark, Matt, and Skippy set out to find a flower thief who picks protected flowers in the National Park, but all they know of him is his name, "Fred". They are a team of two who use a machete to cut the flowers. They are then sold by flower sellers. Skippy shows Matt the location of the thieves. Matt, Sir Adrian, and Mark pursue the thieves and bring them in.
