= Shark Attack (disambiguation) =

A shark attack is a biting incident involving a shark.

Shark Attack (or Shark Bite) may also refer to:

== Lists of shark attacks ==
- International Shark Attack File, a global database of shark attacks
- Shark attacks in South Australia
- Lists of fatal shark attacks

== Films ==
- Jersey Shore: Shark Attack (2012 film), a SyFy telemovie monster film
- Malibu Shark Attack (2009 film), a SyFy telemovie monster film in the Maneater film series produced by RHI Entertainment
- Spring Break: Shark Attack (2005 film), a CBS telefilm monster movie
- Shark Attack (film), a 1999 monster film telemovie produced by Nu Image Films
- Shark Attack 2, a 2000 direct-to-video monster film produced by Nu Image Films
- Shark Attack 3: Megalodon, a 2002 direct-to-video monster film produced by Nu Image Films
- 2-Headed Shark Attack, a 2012 SyFy telefilm monster movie produced by The Asylum
- 3-Headed Shark Attack, a 2015 SyFy telefilm monster movie produced by The Asylum
- 5-Headed Shark Attack, a 2017 SyFy telefilm monster movie produced by The Asylum

== Music ==
- "Shark Attack", a song by Grouplove from Spreading Rumours
- "Shark Attack", a song by Limp Bizkit from Gold Cobra
- "Shark Attack", a song by Split Enz from True Colours
- "Shark Attack", a song by Math the Band

== Video games ==
- Lochjaw, a 1982 video game by Games by Apollo later renamed to Shark Attack

== See also ==
- Shark attack prevention
- List of killer shark films
- Attack (disambiguation)
- Shark (disambiguation)
