= Lists of fatal shark attacks =

Lists of fatal shark attacks include:

- List of fatal shark attacks in Australia
- List of fatal shark attacks in Réunion
- List of fatal shark attacks in South Africa
- List of fatal shark attacks in the United States

== See also ==
- Shark attack
- Shark Attack (disambiguation)
