= Black December =

Shark attacks in South Africa, 1957–1958

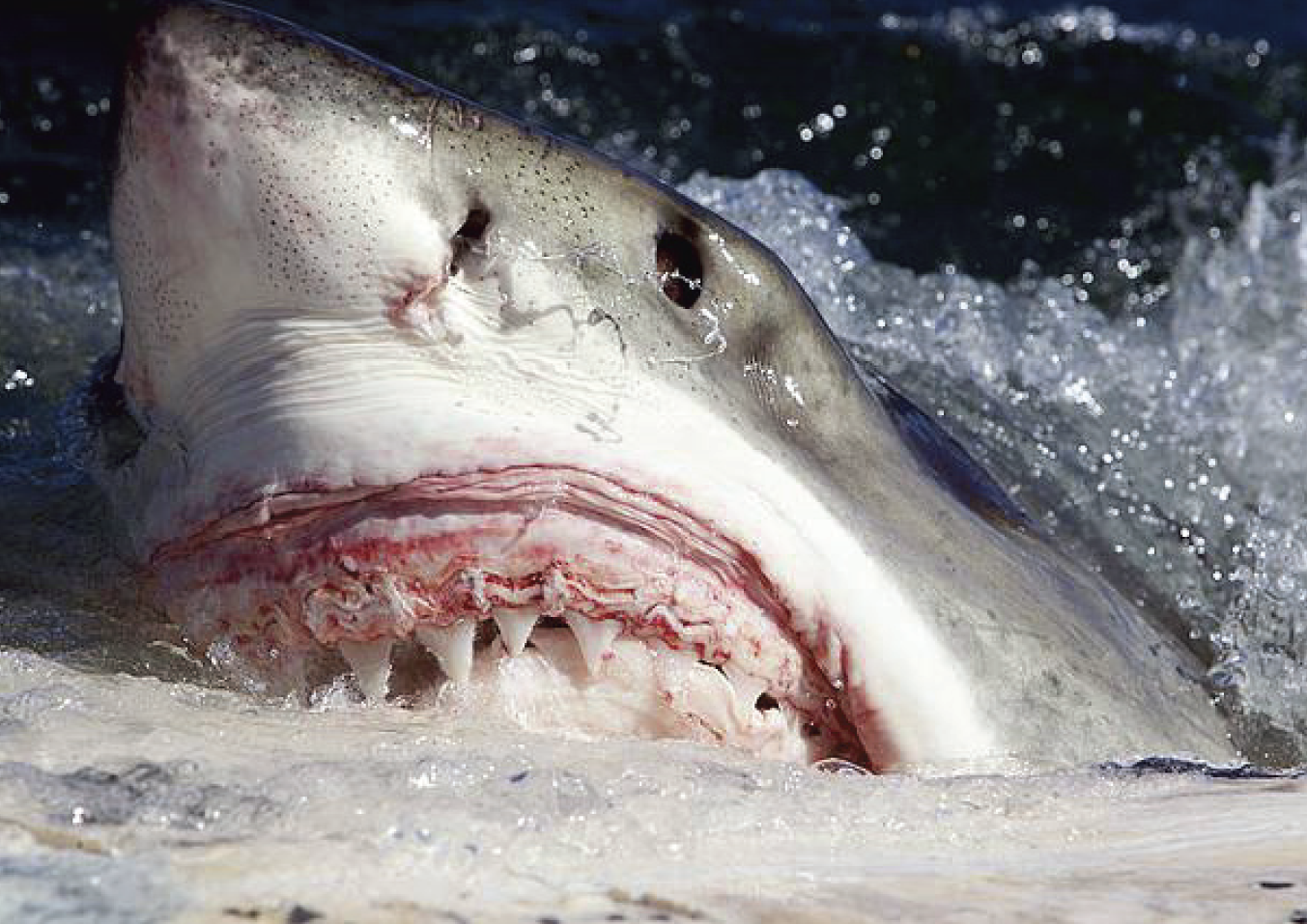
Great white shark scavenging whale carcass

Black December refers to at least nine shark attacks on humans causing six deaths that occurred along the coast of Natal Province in the Union of South Africa, from December 18, 1957, to April 5, 1958.

In December 1957 several key factors occurred simultaneously to attract sharks to the Durban area, including: (1) whaling ships operating in the area; (2) rivers had flooded and washed livestock into the Indian Ocean and made the river deltas murky; and (3) recent resort development had increased the number of tourists swimming off the beaches.

== Attack victims ==
Name	Age	Date	Species	Location	Nature of injury(s)	Ref.
Fay Jones Bester	28	1958-04-05	Unknown	Uvongo	Fatal attack, while surfing.	
Nicholaas Badenhorst	29	1958-04-03	Unknown	Port Edward	Fatal attack, arm severed above elbow, abdomen and leg bitten, while swimming.	
Derryck Garth Prinsloo	42	1958-01-04	Great white shark	Scottburgh	Fatal attack, mauled below waist, femoral artery severed, while standing.	
Unknown male	--	1958	Unknown	MaKakatana River	Fatal attack, right leg severed above knee, while fishing.	
Julia Painting	14	1957-12-30	Unknown	Margate	Non-fatal attack, left arm severed, torso bitten, thigh lacerated, many abrasions, while standing.	
Donald Webster	20	1957-12-26	Unknown	Port Edward	Non-fatal attack, lacerations on head and neck, while skindiving.	
Vernon James Berry	23	1957-12-23	Unknown	Margate	Fatal attack, right arm broken and stripped of flesh, left hand severed above wrist, lower abdomen, buttocks, & thigh bitten, while floating.	
Allan Green	15	1957-12-20	Unknown	Uvongo	Fatal attack, multiple severe injuries, while standing.	
Robert Wherley	16	1957-12-18	Unknown	Karridene	Non-fatal attack, left leg severed at knee, part of left thigh removed, while body surfing.	

== Attempted solutions ==
Tourists fled the Durban area during Black December, impacting the local economy. The local authorities made various attempts to protect swimmers and surfers from sharks, including enclosures built from wooden poles and netting which were ineffective and destroyed by the surf. A South African Navy frigate dropped depth charges causing some shark fatalities, while also attracting more sharks into the area that feasted on the dead fish.

== KwaZulu-Natal Sharks Board ==
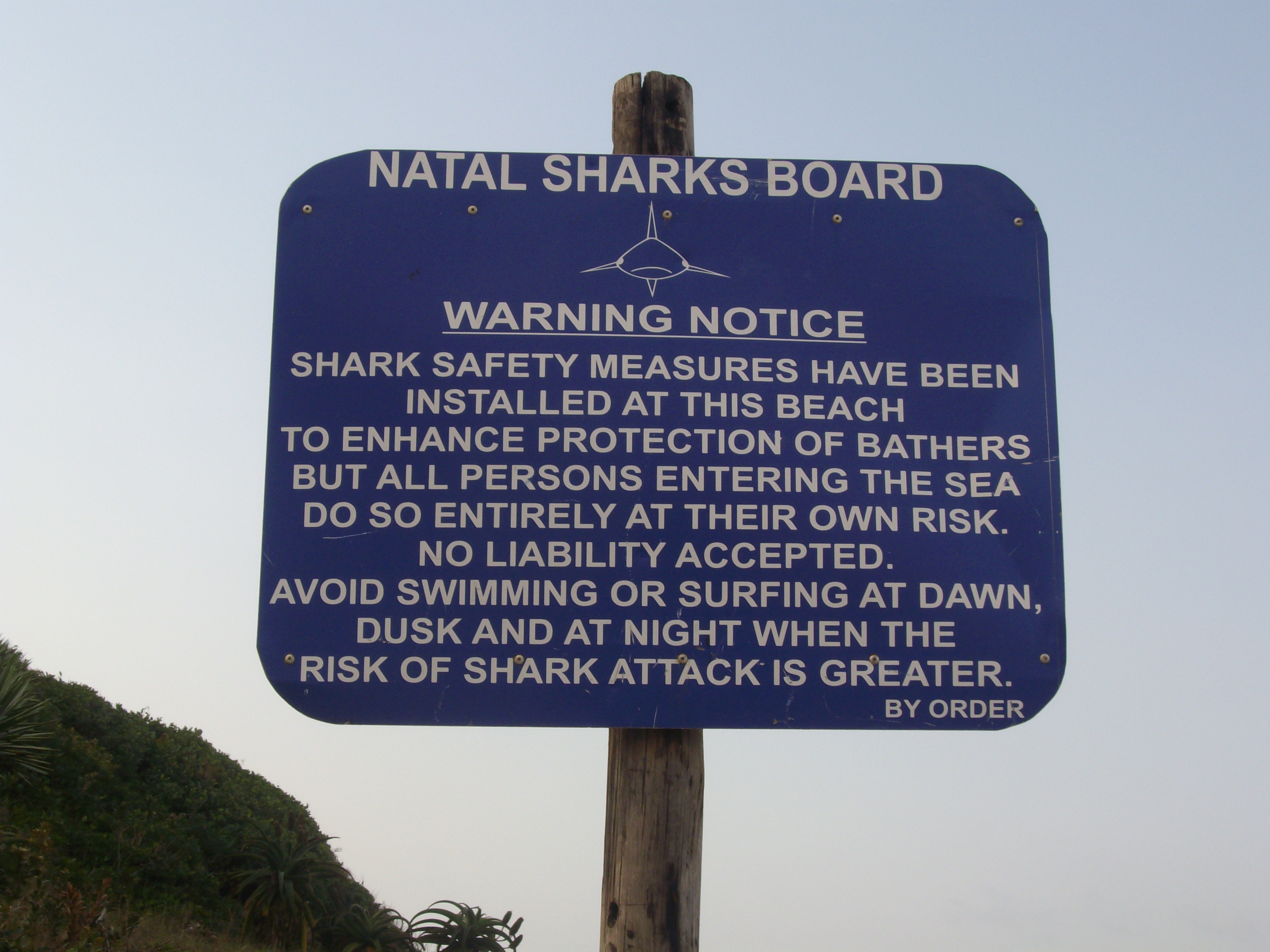

As a result of Black December the KwaZulu-Natal Sharks Board, previously the Natal Sharks Board and Natal Anti-Shark Measures Board, was formed in 1962. The organization's mandate is to maintain shark nets and drum lines at 38 places, along 320 km of coastline of the KwaZulu-Natal Province, South Africa, to protect bathers and surfers from possible shark attacks.

== See also ==
- List of fatal shark attacks in South African territorial waters
- List of shark attacks in South African territorial waters
- 2010 Sharm El Sheikh shark attacks
- Jersey Shore shark attacks of 1916
- Red Triangle (Pacific Ocean)
- Summer of the Shark
