= List of shark attacks in South African territorial waters =

List of shark attacks in South African territorial waters.

== List ==
Name	Age	Date	Species	Location	Comments
Mathew Smithers		2014-08-01	Great white shark	Muizenberg Beach, Western Cape	The victim sustained serious injuries to both his legs.
Fundile Nodumla	39	2013-03-03	Unknown	Second Beach, Port St. Johns	Injuries on both arms, chest and abdomen, fought off the shark with his bare hands in shallow water.
Liya Sibili	20	2012-12-25	Unknown	Second Beach, Port St. Johns	Killed by shark in waist-deep water at approximately 4:20pm. Only his bathing trunks were recovered despite a three-day search for his body.
Michael Cohen	42	2011-09-29	Great white shark	Fish Hoek, Western Cape	Leg bitten off and the other severed below the knee in a shark attack
Lloyd Skinner	37	2010-01-12	Great white shark	Fish Hoek, Western Cape	Skinner was eaten alive by a great white shark, described as "being as large as a dinosaur"
Achmat Hassiem	24	2006-08-13	Great white shark	Muizenberg Beach, Western Cape	In 2006 his right leg was severed by a four-and-a-half metre long great white shark whilst he was training for lifesaving exams at Muizenberg beach with his brother Tariq; the lower portion of his leg was subsequently amputated. Because of the manner in which he sustained his disability Hassiem is nicknamed "Sharkboy".
Black December		1957 to 1958	Unknown	KwaZulu-Natal	At least five fatal attacks.

== See also ==
- List of fatal shark attacks in South African territorial waters
