= Shark attacks in Australia =

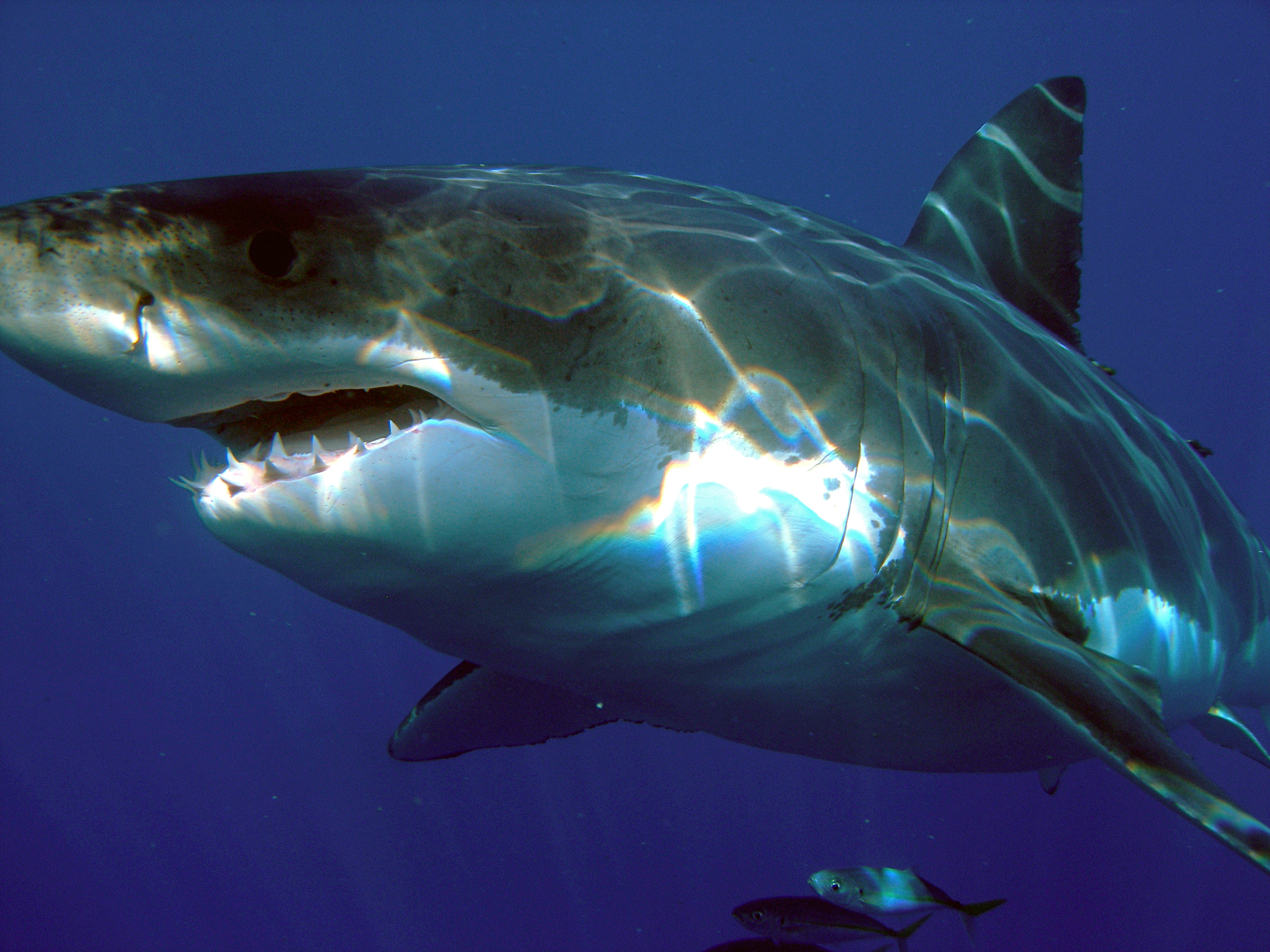
Great white shark

Between 1791 and April 2018 it was reported that there have been 1,068 shark attacks in Australia with 237 of them being fatal.

Four species of sharks account for the vast majority of fatal attacks on humans: the bull shark, tiger shark, oceanic whitetip shark and the great white shark.

In 2021 Australian authorities pushed to rebrand shark attacks as "negative encounters" or "interactions" to boost conservation efforts and alter perceptions of sharks as vicious.

== Precautions against attacks ==
The Australian Department of the Environment, Water, Heritage and the Arts states precautions which can be taken to reduce the risk of shark attacks. These include avoiding swimming far from the shore, at the mouth of a river or on drop-offs to deeper water; avoiding swimming in dirty water, alone or with domestic animals, near people fishing, or at dusk or night; and to leave the water if schools of fish behave erratically or group in large numbers. The Australian Institute of Marine Science also states many of these and other precautions including not wearing jewelry or reflective clothing while swimming, and not swimming with any bleeding wounds.

== Non-fatal attacks ==
Name, age	Date	Species	Location; Comments
Leah Stewart, 35	13 June 2026	Great white shark	Swimming with friends 100 feet offshore of off Sydney's Coogee Beach when she was attacked. An off-duty lifeguard pulled her onto his paddleboard. She suffered 12-inch wide bites exposing bone on her thigh and arm; she was airlifted to St. Vincent's Hospital.
Lauren O'Neill, 29	29 January 2024	Bull shark	Local resident Lauren O'Neill was swimming at dusk close to the shore at Elizabeth Bay in Sydney Harbour, when a bull shark was believed to have bitten her on the leg below the knee. Residents of the nearby waterfront apartment building heard her cries for help and assisted in stemming blood flow until medics arrived. O'Neill was taken to nearby St Vincent's Hospital and is expected to make a full recovery.
Joe Hoffman, 25	5 July 2021	Great white shark	Hoffman, a surfer, was mauled by a white shark while surfing at Crescent Head on the NSW Mid North Coast. He suffered severe injuries to his right arm but surgeons expected it would be saved.
Unnamed, 25	23 June 2021		A surfer was attacked by an unidentified species off the coast of Leeman.
Jackson Bartlett, 10	11 June 2021	Bronze whaler	Snorkeling at Five Finger Reef near Coral Bay.
Lucas Arnott, 10	17 July 2020	Great white shark	Five km offshore from Stanley, Tasmania, a ten-year-old boy was grabbed by a shark and pulled into the water from a 6 m fishing boat. The boy's father jumped into the water and retrieved the child, who suffered lacerations to his arm and cuts to his head and chest. Appears the child's lifejacket protected the boy, which was shredded.
Wil Schroeter, 59	17 January 2020		Wil Schroeter, a 59-year-old father of two from Albion Park, bitten around the foot while surfing at Windang Beach.
Chris Blowes, 26	25 April 2015	Great white shark	Blowes and friends were surfing at Fishery Bay, 35 km from Port Lincoln in South Australia when a 6 m great white attacked. Blowes' life was saved when his friends wrapped a leg rope as a tourniquet until he was air lifted to the Royal Adelaide Hospital. He lost his left leg and was clinically dead (his heart stopped for 90 minutes following the attack) but has made a remarkable recovery.
Paddy Trumbull, 60	13 February 2010		Trumbull, a 60-year-old grandmother from Sydney, survived a shark attack off north-eastern Australia. She suffered severe lacerations to her buttocks and lost several pints of blood in the attack, which took place on the afternoon of Saturday, 13 February 2010, while she and her husband were snorkeling off Dent Island in Queensland.
Paul de Gelder, 31	11 February 2009	Bull shark	An Australian navy diver was attacked by a shark whilst training near Garden Island in Sydney Harbour. He lost an arm and a leg in the attack.
Dirk Avery, 52,	November 2000	Great white shark	Dirk Avery, a friend of Ken Crew, was badly wounded by his legs when he tried to defend him from the shark. Crew lost his leg and died.
Rodney Fox, 23	December 1963	Great white shark	Attacked while spearfishing and badly bitten around the chest and arm and survived.
Albert Pride, 20	February 1951		Lake Illawarra, fought off an attacking shark with a penknife.
Oates, youth	December 1929		Currumbin, punched and kicked shark and fought it off.

== Mitigation ==
Measures have been implemented in Australia to help reduce the severity or risk of shark attacks in Australia.

=== Shark netting ===
Example of a shark net

Since shark netting began in 1937, the number of deaths from sharks on beaches in New South Wales has decreased, with only one fatal attack recorded at a netted beach during that period. In Queensland, there have been no fatal attacks on netted beaches since nets were introduced in the 1960s.

Shark nets have been installed at numerous beaches to help reduce shark encounters near designated swimming areas, but have been criticized for marine bycatch. These nets are typically lifted every 24 to 48 hours for servicing and to remove sharks and other marine life that have become entangled in them. Sharks caught in the nets often die by drowning, as they need to swim to force water over their gills to breathe.

According to Humane World for Animals, the majority of animals caught in shark nets are not target shark species and include "Critically Endangered wildlife". Additionally, 40% of sharks that have become entangled in the nets were caught on the beach side of the net, suggesting that these sharks were able to easily swim around the net. Due to the environmental concerns and questions on their effectiveness, the use of shark nets remains a subject of debate.

=== Shark bite trauma kits ===
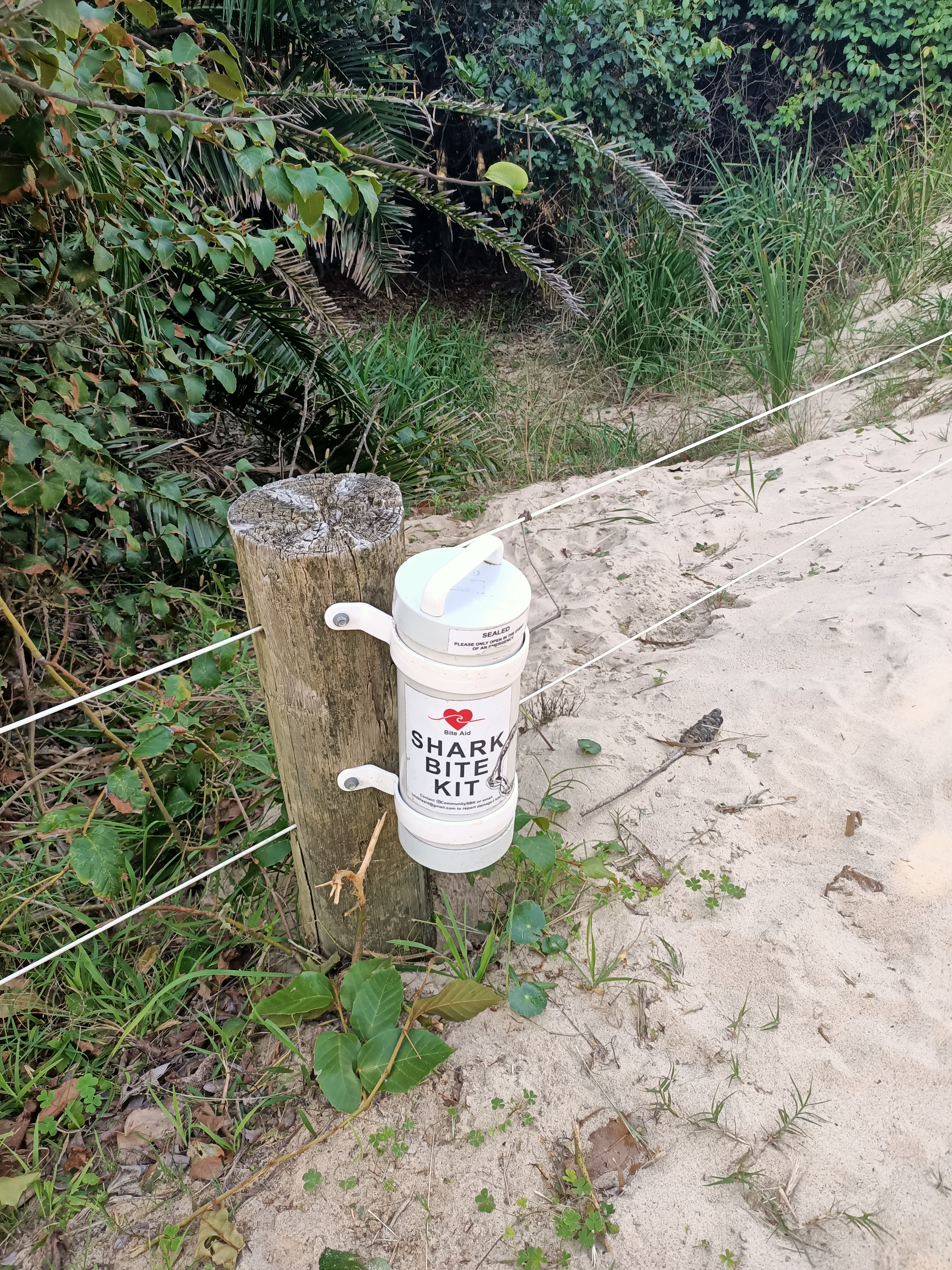
Shark bite kit located on a sandy path leading to a beach in NSW

Shark bite trauma kits are containers that contain emergency bleeding-control equipment, such as tourniquets, wound dressings, thermal blanket, whistle, gloves and first aid instructions. The kit is intended for immediate use to help reduce blood loss following shark bite incidents before first responders arrive. In 2026, Surf Life Saving NSW announced that publicly accessible shark bite trauma kits would be installed at all 129 surf clubs in New South Wales.

=== Drone monitoring ===
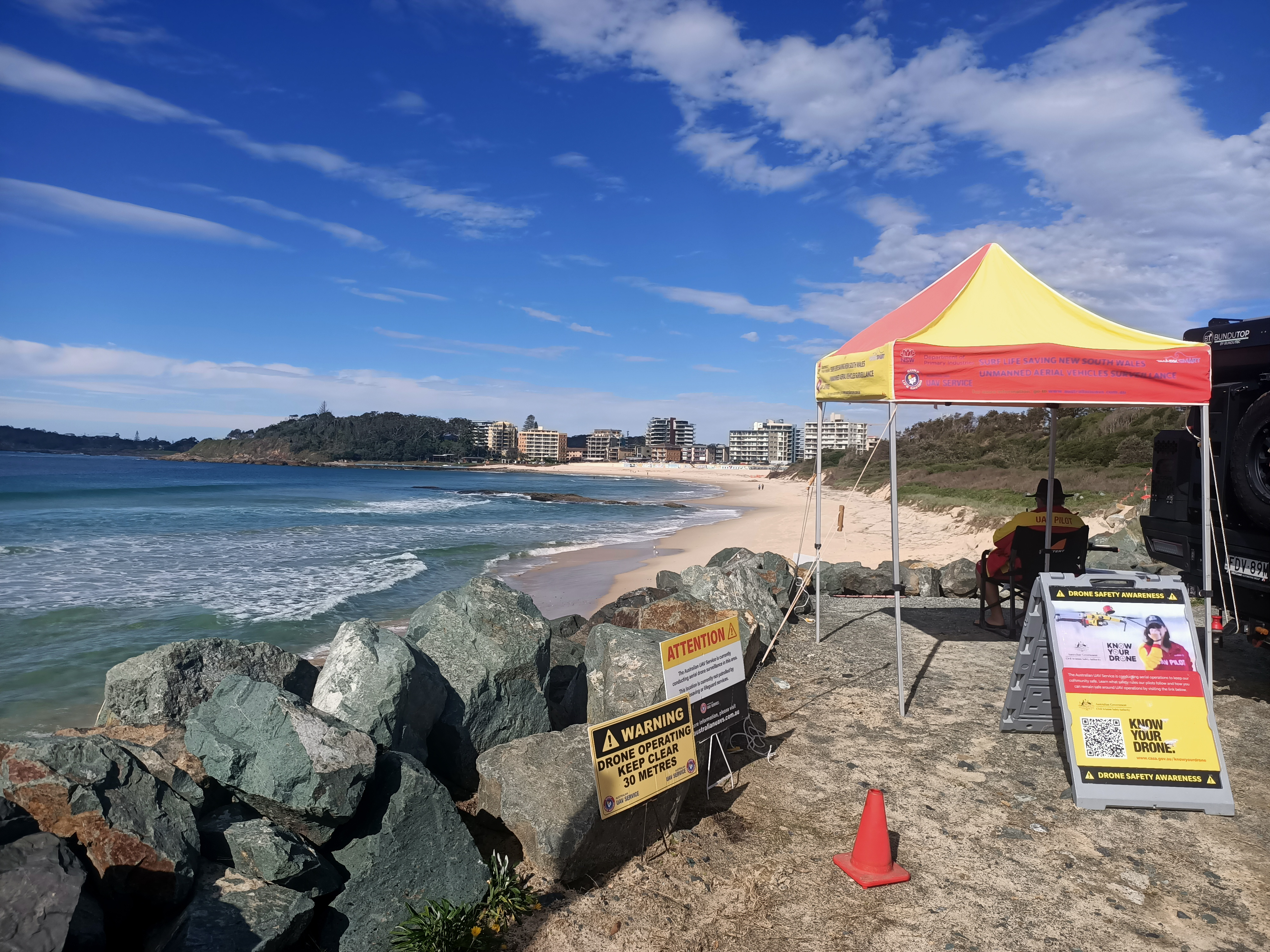
UAV surveillance station in operation at Forster Beach

In New South Wales, the UAV shark surveillance program deploys UAVs to monitor coastal waters for sharks. When target sharks are detected by UAVs, sirens are sounded to warn nearby swimmers. The program first started in 2017 and is delivered by the Australian UAV Service (AUAVS), which is a part of the SLSNSW. As of 2026, there are over 300 UAVs patrolling 80 beaches across NSW on a daily basis.

== See also ==
- Shark attack
- Shark attack prevention
- Shark attacks in South Australia
- List of fatal shark attacks in Australia
