= Mathieu Schiller =

French bodyboarder

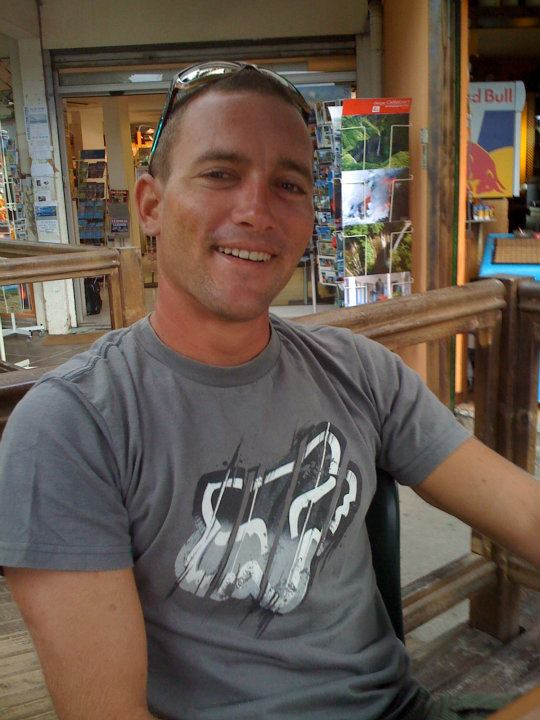

Personal information
- Born: 14 April 1979 Paris, France
- Died: 19 September 2011 (aged 32) Saint-Paul, Réunion, France

Surfing career
- Sport: Surfing
Medal record
Event	1st	2nd	3rd
French championship	1	1	0
European team championship	1	0	0
Total	2	1	0

Mathieu Schiller (14 April 1979 – 19 September 2011) was a French bodyboarder. Crowned French champion in 1993, he later won the team event of the European championships in 1995. He died in a shark attack off Saint-Gilles, Réunion. The attack was likely caused by multiple tiger shark or bull sharks. The presence of sharks and turbulent conditions forced rescuers to abandon an immediate attempt to retrieve his body; his remains were never recovered.

Schiller was certified as a state sports coach in 2007 after being a lifeguard since 2004. In 2008 Schiller founded a surfing school, Boucan Surf S'cool, which operated until 2013. In 2009 he created a brand of surfwear called Local Brothers which was a sponsor of Reunion Island bodysurfers since 2010.

== Bodyboarding ==
Schiller started bodyboarding in La Réunion in his youth. In 1993 he finished 3rd in the La Réunion junior championship and second in La Réunion for competitors under 14 years of age. That same year he placed second in France in the championship at Guadeloupe.

In 1994, he was crowned French bodyboard champion. In 1995 he ranked 7th in the individual European championship and became European team champion, defeating on 11 July, 9 times world champion Mike Stewart. Sponsored in 1996, he competed throughout France, Portugal, and England. He was 9th in the Hollywood bodyboard pro and 45th in the world. Following this competition, he was invited to participate in the Pipe Master. In 2001, he placed second for La Réunion in bodyboarding and in 2007, he was a finalist in this championship.

In 2005 in La Réunion, Schiller pioneered the practice of tow-in surfing with jet skis.

== Death ==
On 19 September 2011 at approximately noon Schiller was surfing along with over a dozen other surfers on Reunion Island. After diving under a wave he was seen being attacked by several sharks. The first shark bit his legs. Schiller was witnessed beating the shark with his boogie board. A second shark bit his torso while another shark was seen snapping his jaws around Schiller. Vincent Rzepecki was the first guard to attempt a rescue. Fellow surfer Yves Delaplin arrived to the scene and held Schiller on his board while Rzepecki arrived. Rzepecki took Schiller on his board but was quickly knocked out by newly forming waves. Rzepecki held on to Schiller but subsequent waves forced the now deceased surfer from his arms. After swimming to shore the fire department initiated the recovery of Schiller's body, but were quickly overwhelmed by the number of sharks in the vicinity of the impact zone. After three hours of searching, a police helicopter found Schiller's body 15 metres (50 ft) out on a 23 metres (75 ft) rock jetty. Bite wounds were discovered along his side. It was the fourth shark attack that year.

Since Schiller's death in 2011, the number of licensed surfers in Reunion has fallen from 1,600 to 400 in 2015.
