= Summer of the Shark =

Media sensationalism about sharks in 2001

The Summer of the Shark refers to the coverage of shark attacks by American news media in the summer of 2001. The sensationalist coverage of shark attacks began in early July following the Fourth of July weekend shark attack on 8-year-old Jessie Arbogast, and continued almost unabated—despite no evidence for an actual increase in attacks—until the September 11 terrorist attacks shifted the media's attention away from beaches. The Summer of the Shark has since been remembered as an example of tabloid television perpetuating a story with no real merit beyond its ability to draw ratings.

== Outline ==
The media's fixation with shark attacks began on July 6, when 8-year-old Mississippi boy Jessie Arbogast was bitten by a bull shark while standing in shallow water at Santa Rosa Island's Langdon Beach. The shark, which measured approximately 7 feet (2.1 m) in length, bit off Arbogast's arm in the attack; it was then caught and killed after being dragged by its tail onto shore by Arbogast's uncle, Vance Flosenzier. Although Arbogast was immediately pulled out the water by an unidentified bystander, the severe blood loss he suffered caused damage to his organs and brain, complicating his recovery. Arbogast's arm was later removed from the captured shark's mouth and surgically reattached.

Immediately after the near-fatal attack on Arbogast, another attack severed the leg of a New Yorker vacationing in The Bahamas, while a third attack on a surfer occurred about a week later on July 15, six miles from the spot where Arbogast was bitten. In the following weeks, Arbogast's spectacular rescue and survival received extensive coverage in the 24-hour news cycle, which was renewed (and then redoubled) with each subsequent report of a shark incident. The media fixation continued with a cover story in the July 30th issue of Time magazine.

In mid-August, many networks were showing footage captured by helicopters of hundreds of sharks coalescing off the southwest coast of Florida. Beach-goers were warned of the dangers of swimming, despite the fact that the swarm was probably part of an annual shark migration. The repeated broadcasts of the shark group has been criticized as blatant fear mongering, leading to the unwarranted belief of a so-called shark "epidemic".

Two additional shark attacks, both fatal, occurred during the first three days of September—one in Virginia and one in North Carolina. By early September, there were calls to pass legislation to help "control the problem." The Summer of the Shark came to a quick end following the September 11 terrorist attacks, as the media had shifted attention to the destruction at the Pentagon, lower Manhattan and Shanksville, Pennsylvania.

Investigative journalist John Stossel explains the media's shark fixation in his book Give Me a Break, stating:

Instead of putting risks in proportion, we [reporters] hype interesting ones. Tom Brokaw, Katie Couric, and countless others called 2001 the "summer of the shark." [...] In truth, there wasn't a remarkable surge in shark attacks in 2001. There were about as many in 1995 and 2000, but 1995 was the year of the O.J. Simpson trial, and 2000 was an election year. The summer of 2001 was a little dull, so reporters focused on sharks.

=== Statistics ===
In terms of absolute minutes of television coverage on the three major broadcast networks—ABC, CBS, and NBC—shark attacks were 2001's third "most important" news story prior to September 11, behind the western United States forest fires, and the political scandal resulting from the Chandra Levy missing persons case. However, the comparatively higher shock value of shark attacks left a lasting impression on the public. According to the International Shark Attack File, there were 76 shark attacks that occurred in 2001, lower than the 85 attacks documented in 2000; furthermore, although five people were killed in attacks in 2001, this was fewer than the 12 deaths caused by shark attacks the previous year.

== See also ==
- Media circus
- List of fatal unprovoked shark attacks in the United States
