= Shark attack =

Attack on a human by a shark

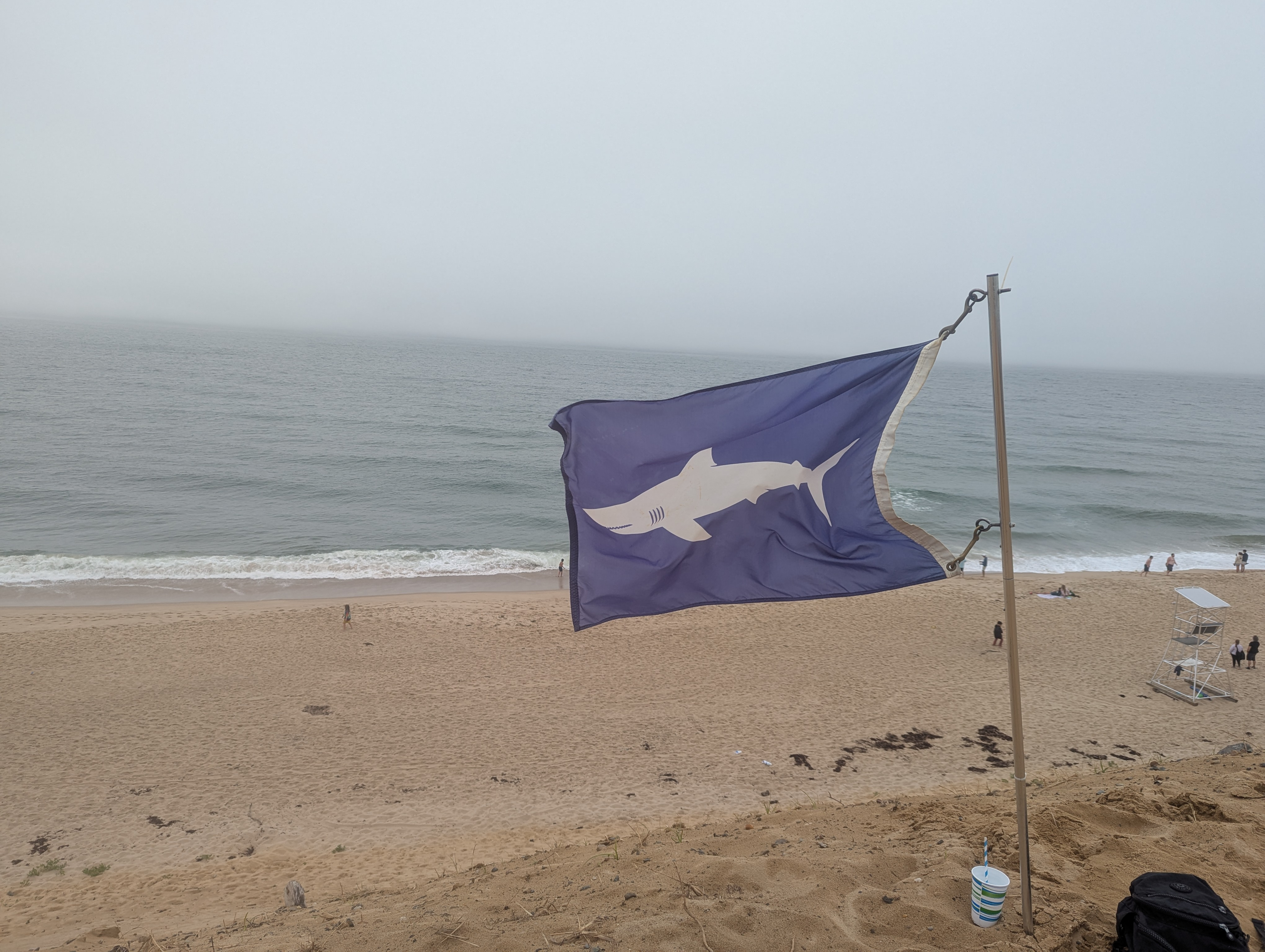
- A flag at Cahoon Hollow Beach in Wellfleet, Massachusetts warning of shark activity
- Symptoms: Bleeding, lacerations from the shark's teeth
- Complications: Amputation, blood loss, sepsis
- Causes: Sharks
- Risk factors: Swimming, Surfing, Spearfishing, Diving, Snorkelling, being stuck adrift
- Prevention: Shark barrier, Shark nets, Drum lines, range of other methods
- Frequency: Rare

A shark attack is an incident in which a shark bites or otherwise injures a human. Every year, around 80 unprovoked attacks are reported worldwide. Despite their rarity, many people fear shark attacks after occasional serial attacks, such as the Jersey Shore shark attacks of 1916, and horror fiction and films such as the Jaws series. Out of more than 500 shark species, only three are responsible for a double-digit number of fatal, unprovoked attacks on humans: the great white, tiger, and bull. Humans are not part of a shark's normal diet. Sharks usually feed on small fish and invertebrates, seals, sea lions, and other marine mammals. A shark attack will usually occur if the shark feels curious or confused.

== Terminology ==
While the term "shark attack" is in common use for instances of humans being wounded by sharks, it has been suggested that this is based largely on the assumption that large predatory sharks (such as great white, bull, and tiger sharks) seek humans as prey. A 2013 review recommends that only in instances where a shark clearly predates on a human should the bite incident be termed an "attack," implying predation. Otherwise, it is more accurate to class bite incidents as "fatal bite incidents". Sightings do include physical interaction, encounters including physical interaction with harm, shark bites include major shark bite incidents, including those that require medical attention, and fatal shark bite incidents that result in death. The study suggests that only where an expert validates the predatory intent of a shark would it be appropriate to term a bite incident an attack.

== Types of attacks ==
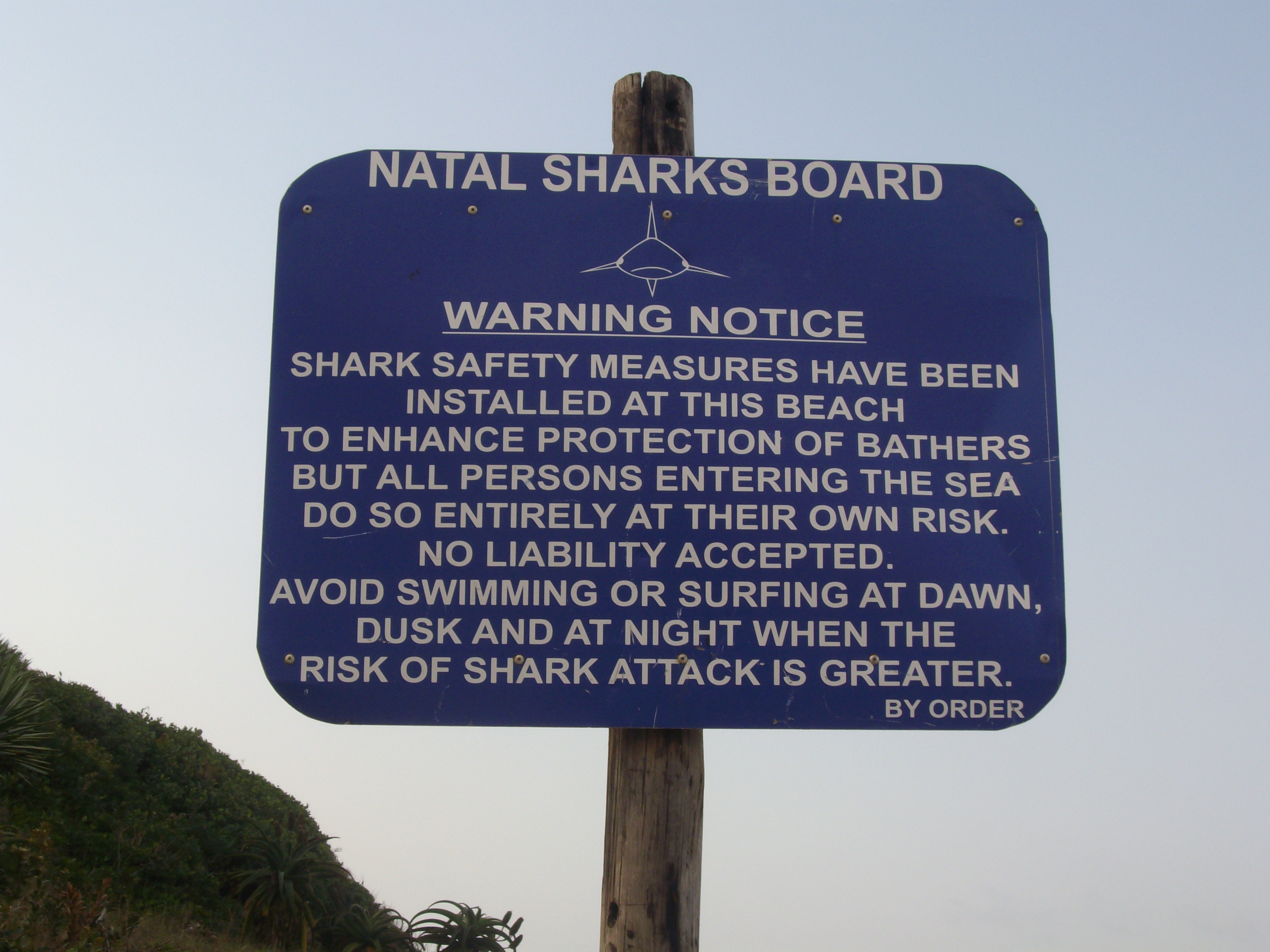
A sign warning about the presence of sharks off Salt Rock, South Africa

Shark attack indices use different criteria to determine if an attack was "provoked" or "unprovoked." When considered from the shark's point of view, attacks on humans who are perceived as a threat to the shark or a competitor to its food source are all "provoked" attacks. Neither the International Shark Attack File (ISAF) nor the Global Shark Attack File (GSAF) accord casualties of air/sea disasters "provoked" or "unprovoked" status. Rather, these incidents are considered a separate category. Postmortem scavenging of human remains (typically drowning victims) are also not accorded "provoked" or "unprovoked" status. The GSAF categorizes scavenging bites on humans as "questionable incidents." The most common criteria for determining "provoked" and "unprovoked" attacks are discussed below:

=== Provoked ===
Provoked attacks occur when a human touches, hooks, nets, or otherwise aggravates the animal. Incidents that occur outside of a shark's natural habitat, such as aquariums and research holding-pens, are considered provoked, as are all incidents involving captured sharks. Sometimes humans inadvertently provoke an attack, such as when a surfer accidentally hits a shark with a surf board.

=== Unprovoked ===
Unprovoked attacks are initiated by the shark—they occur in a shark's natural habitat on a live human and without human provocation. There are three subcategories of unprovoked attack:

- Hit-and-run attack – usually non-fatal, the shark bites and then leaves; most victims do not see the shark. This is the most common type of attack and typically occurs in the surf zone or in murky water. Most hit-and-run attacks are believed to be the result of mistaken identity.
- Sneak attack – the victim will not usually see the shark, and may sustain multiple deep bites. This kind of attack is predatory in nature and is often carried out with the intention of consuming the victim. It is extraordinarily rare for this to occur.
- Bump-and-bite attack – the shark circles and bumps the victim before biting. Great whites are known to do this on occasion, referred to as a "test bite", in which the great white is trying to identify what is being bitten. Repeated bites, depending on the reaction of the victim (thrashing or panicking may lead the shark to believe the victim is prey), are not uncommon and can be severe or fatal. Bump-and-bite attacks are not believed to be the result of mistaken identity.

An incident occurred in 2011 when a 3-meter long (~500 kg) great white shark jumped onto a 7-person research vessel off Seal Island, South Africa. The crew were undertaking a population study using sardines as bait and initially retreated to safety in the bow of the ship while the shark thrashed about, damaging equipment and fuel lines. To keep the shark alive while a rescue ship towed the research vessel to shore, the crew poured water over its gills and eventually used a pump for mechanical ventilation. The shark was ultimately lifted back into the water via crane and, after becoming disoriented and beaching itself in the harbor, was successfully towed out to sea. The incident was judged an accident.

== Reasons for attacks ==
Large shark species are apex predators in their environment, and thus have little fear of any creature (other than orcas) with which they cross paths. Like most sophisticated hunters, they are curious when they encounter something unusual in their territories. Lacking any limbs with sensitive digits such as hands or feet, the only way they can explore an object or organism is to bite it. These bites are known as test bites. Generally, shark bites are exploratory, and the animal will swim away after one bite. For example, exploratory bites on surfers are thought to be caused by the shark mistaking the surfer and surfboard for the shape of prey. Nonetheless, a single bite can grievously injure a human if the animal involved is a powerful predator such as a great white or tiger shark.

A shark will normally make one swift attack and then retreat to wait for the victim to die or weaken from shock and blood loss, before returning to feed. This protects the shark from injury from a wounded and aggressive target; it also allows humans time to get out of the water and survive. Shark attacks may also occur due to territorial reasons or as dominance over another shark species.

Sharks are equipped with sensory organs called the Ampullae of Lorenzini that detect the electricity generated by muscle movement. The shark's electrical receptors, which pick up movement, detect signals like those emitted from wounded fish. For example, someone who is spearfishing, leading the shark to attack the person by mistake. According to George H. Burgess, director of the International Shark Attack File, "Attacks are basically an odds game based on how many hours you are in the water".

== Statistics ==
Total shark attacks per year, 1749 to 2018

According to the International Shark Attack File (ISAF), between 1958 and 2016 there were 2,785 confirmed unprovoked shark attacks around the world, of which 439 were fatal. Between 2001 and 2010, an average of 4.3 people per year died from shark attacks.

In 2000, there were 79 shark attacks reported worldwide, 11 of them fatal. In 2005 and 2006, this number decreased to 61 and 62 respectively, while the number of fatalities dropped to only four per year. The 2016 yearly total of 81 shark attacks worldwide was on par with the most recent five-year (2011–2015) average of 82 incidents annually. By contrast, the 98 shark attacks in 2015 was the highest yearly total on record. There were four fatalities worldwide in 2016, which is lower than the average of eight fatalities per year worldwide in the 2011–2015 period and six deaths per annum over the past decade. In 2016, 58% of attacks were on surfers.

Despite these reports, however, the actual number of fatal shark attacks worldwide remains uncertain. In most Third World coastal nations, no method of reporting suspected shark attacks exists. Therefore, losses and fatalities near-shore or at sea often remain unsolved or unpublicized.

Of these attacks, most occurred in the United States (53 in 2000, 40 in 2005, and 39 in 2006). On average, there are 16 shark attacks per year in the United States, with one fatality every two years. The US states in which the most attacks have occurred are Florida, Hawaii, California, Texas and the Carolinas, though attacks have occurred in almost every coastal state.

Australia has the highest number of fatal shark attacks in the world, with Western Australia the deadliest place in the world for shark attacks with total and fatal shark bites growing from three to 29 total, and from zero to seven fatal bites per five years over the last 40 years. Since 2000, there have been 23 fatal shark attacks along the West Australian coast, with divers now facing odds of one in 16,000 for a fatal shark bite.

Other shark attack hotspots include Réunion Island, Boa Viagem in Brazil, Makena Beach in Maui, Hawaii, and Second Beach, Port St. Johns, South Africa. South Africa has a high number of shark attacks along with a high fatality rate of 27 percent.

As of 28 June 1992, Recife in Brazil began officially registering shark attacks on its beaches (mainly on the beach of Boa Viagem). Over more than two decades, 64 victims were attacked, of whom 26 died. The last deadly attack occurred on 10 July 2021. The attacks were caused by the bull shark and tiger shark species. The shark attacks in Recife have an unusually high fatality rate of about 37%. This is much higher than the worldwide shark attack fatality rate, which is currently about 16%, according to Florida State Museum of Natural History. Several factors have contributed to the unusually high attack and fatality rates, including pollution from sewage runoff and a (now closed) local slaughterhouse.

The place with the most recorded shark attacks is New Smyrna Beach, Florida. Developed nations such as the United States, Australia and, to some extent, South Africa, facilitate more thorough documentation of shark attacks on humans than developing coastal nations. The increased use of technology has enabled Australia and the United States to record more data than other nations, which could somewhat bias the results. In addition, individuals and institutions in South Africa, the United States, and Australia keep a file which is regularly updated by an entire research team, the International Shark Attack File, and the Australian Shark Attack File.

The Florida Museum of Natural History compares these statistics with the much higher rate of deaths from other causes. For example, an average of more than 38 people die annually from lightning strikes in coastal states, while less than 1 person per year is killed by a shark in Florida. In the United States, the likelihood that a person who goes to beaches will be attacked by a shark is 1 in 11.5 million, and a person's chance of getting killed by a shark is less than 1 in 264.1 million.

However, in certain situations the risk of a shark attack is higher. For example, in the southwest of Western Australia the chances of a surfer being fatally bitten by a shark in winter or spring are 1 in 40,000 and for divers it is 1 in 16,000. In comparison to the risk of a serious or fatal cycling accident, this represents three times the risk for a surfer and seven times the risk for a diver.

In comparison to previous years, ISAF reported a total of 57 unprovoked shark bites worldwide in 2022, which is lower than the past five-year average of 70 incidents annually. There were also 32 provoked bites, 4 boat bites, and a few other incidents classified differently, totaling 108 cases investigated by ISAF in 2022. This reflects a decrease in both fatal and non-fatal shark bites.

Confirmed unprovoked shark attacks, 1958–2023
Region	Total attacks	Fatal attacks	Last fatality
United States (Note: Excluding Hawaii)	1106	37	2021
Australia	647	261	2025
Africa	347	95	2023
Asia	129	48	2000
Hawaii	137	11	2024
Pacific Islands / Oceania (Note: Excluding Hawaii, Australia and New Zealand)	129	50	2023
South America	117	26	2018
Antilles and Bahamas	71	17	2023
Middle America	56	27	2011
Europe	52	27	1989
New Zealand	50	10	2021
Réunion Island	39	19	2019
Unspecified / Open ocean	21	7	1995
Bermuda	3	0	—
Total:	2900	633	2023
Sources: Shark Attack Data Australia Australian Shark Attack File for unprovoked attacks in Australia; International Shark Attack File for unprovoked attacks in all other regions Last Updated: 9 February 2023

== Species involved in incidents ==
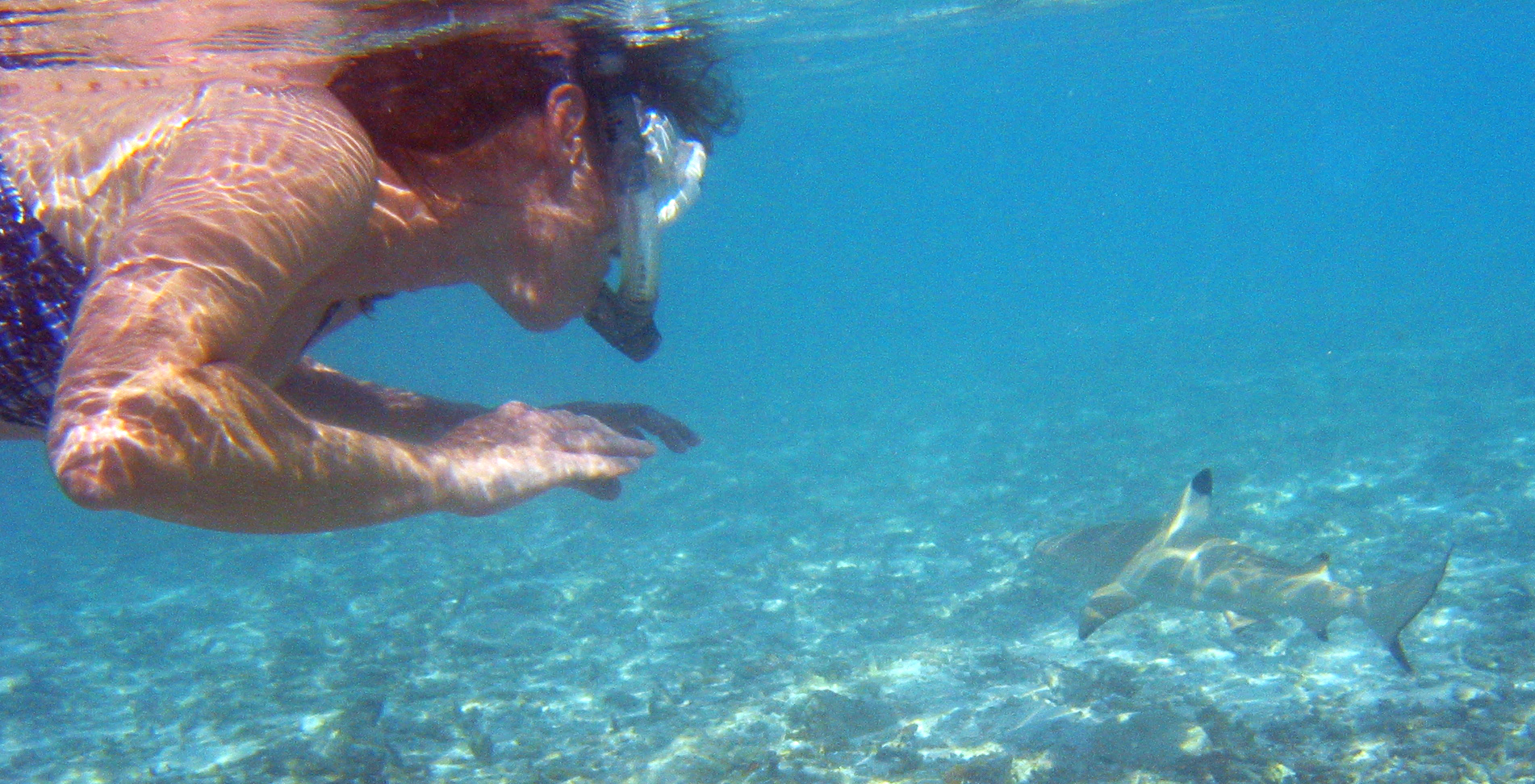
A blacktip reef shark. In rare circumstances such as poor visibility, blacktips may bite humans, mistaking them for prey. Under normal conditions, however, they are harmless and often even quite shy.

Only a few shark species are dangerous to humans. Out of more than 480 shark species, only three are responsible for two-digit numbers of fatal unprovoked attacks on humans: the great white, tiger and bull. However, the oceanic whitetip has probably killed many more ship wreck and plane crash survivors, who have not been included in the statistics. These sharks, being large and powerful predators, may sometimes attack and kill people, even though all have been filmed in open water by unprotected divers. The 2009 French film Oceans shows footage of humans swimming next to sharks in the ocean. It is possible that the sharks can sense the presence of unnatural elements on or about the divers, such as polyurethane diving suits and air tanks, which may lead them to accept the divers as more of a curiosity than prey. Uncostumed humans, however, such as those surfboarding, light snorkeling or swimming, present a much greater area of exposed skin surface to sharks. In addition, the presence of even small traces of blood, recent minor abrasions, cuts, scrapes, or bruises, may lead sharks to attack a human in their environment. Sharks seek out prey through electroreception, sensing the electric fields that are generated by all animals due to the activity of their nerves and muscles.

Most of the oceanic whitetip shark's attacks have not been recorded, unlike the other three species mentioned above. Famed oceanographic researcher Jacques Cousteau described the oceanic whitetip as "the most dangerous of all sharks".

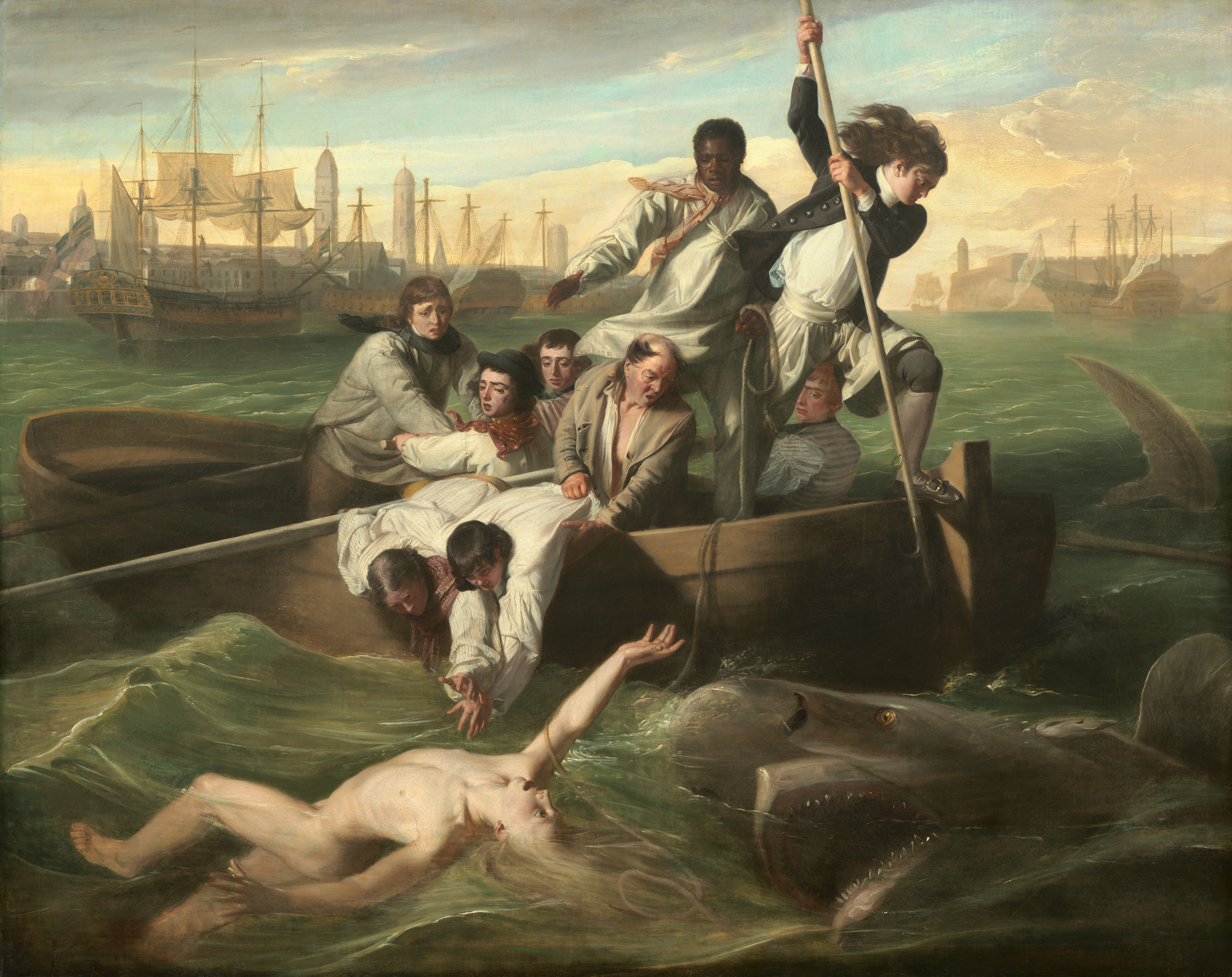
Watson and the Shark by J.S. Copley, based on the attack on Brook Watson in Havana Harbor in 1749

Modern-day statistics show the oceanic whitetip shark as seldom being involved in unprovoked attacks. However, there have been a number of attacks involving this species, particularly during World War I and World War II. The oceanic whitetip lives in the open sea and rarely shows up near coasts, where most recorded incidents occur. During the world wars, many ship and aircraft disasters happened in the open ocean, and because of its former abundance, the oceanic whitetip was often the first species on site when such a disaster happened.

Infamous examples of oceanic whitetip attacks include the sinking of the Nova Scotia, a British steamship carrying 1,000 people that was torpedoed by a German submarine on 18 November 1942, near South Africa. Only 192 people survived, with many deaths attributed to the oceanic whitetip shark. The same species is believed to have been responsible for many of the 600–800 or more casualties following the torpedoing of the USS Indianapolis on 30 July 1945.

Black December refers to at least nine shark attacks on humans, causing six deaths, that occurred along the coast of KwaZulu-Natal Province, South Africa, from 18 December 1957 to 5 April 1958.

In addition to the four species responsible for a significant number of fatal attacks on humans, a number of other species have attacked humans without being provoked, and have on extremely rare occasions been responsible for a human death. This group includes the shortfin mako, hammerhead, Galapagos, grey reef, blacktip, lemon, silky shark, and blue sharks. These sharks are also large, powerful predators which can be provoked simply by being in the water at the wrong time and place, but they are normally considered less dangerous to humans than the previous group.

On the evening of 16 March 2009, a new addition was made to the list of sharks known to have attacked human beings. In a painful but not directly life-threatening incident, a long-distance swimmer crossing the Alenuihaha Channel between the islands of Hawaiʻi and Maui was attacked by a cookiecutter shark. The two bites were delivered about 15 seconds apart.

The three most commonly involved sharks

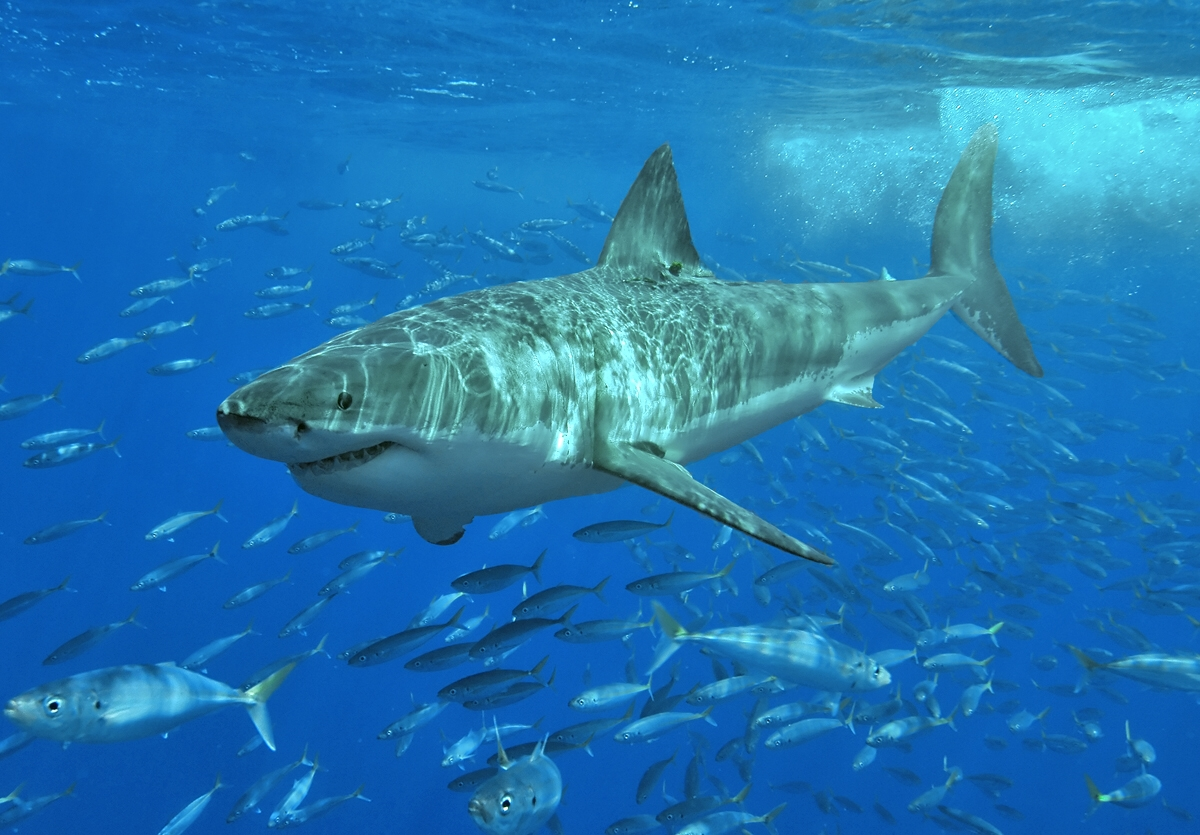
The great white shark is involved in the most fatal unprovoked attacks

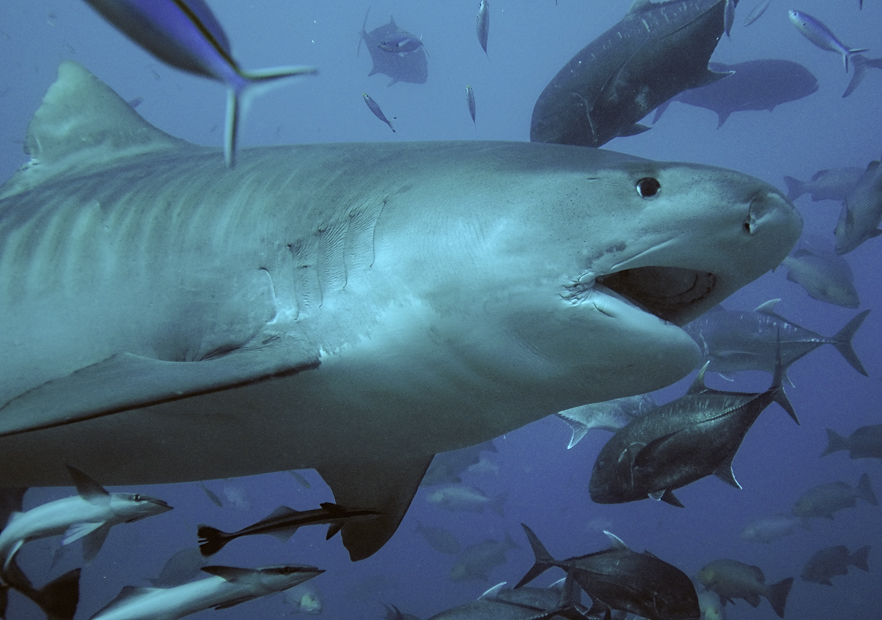
The tiger shark ranks as the second most fatal in unprovoked attacks

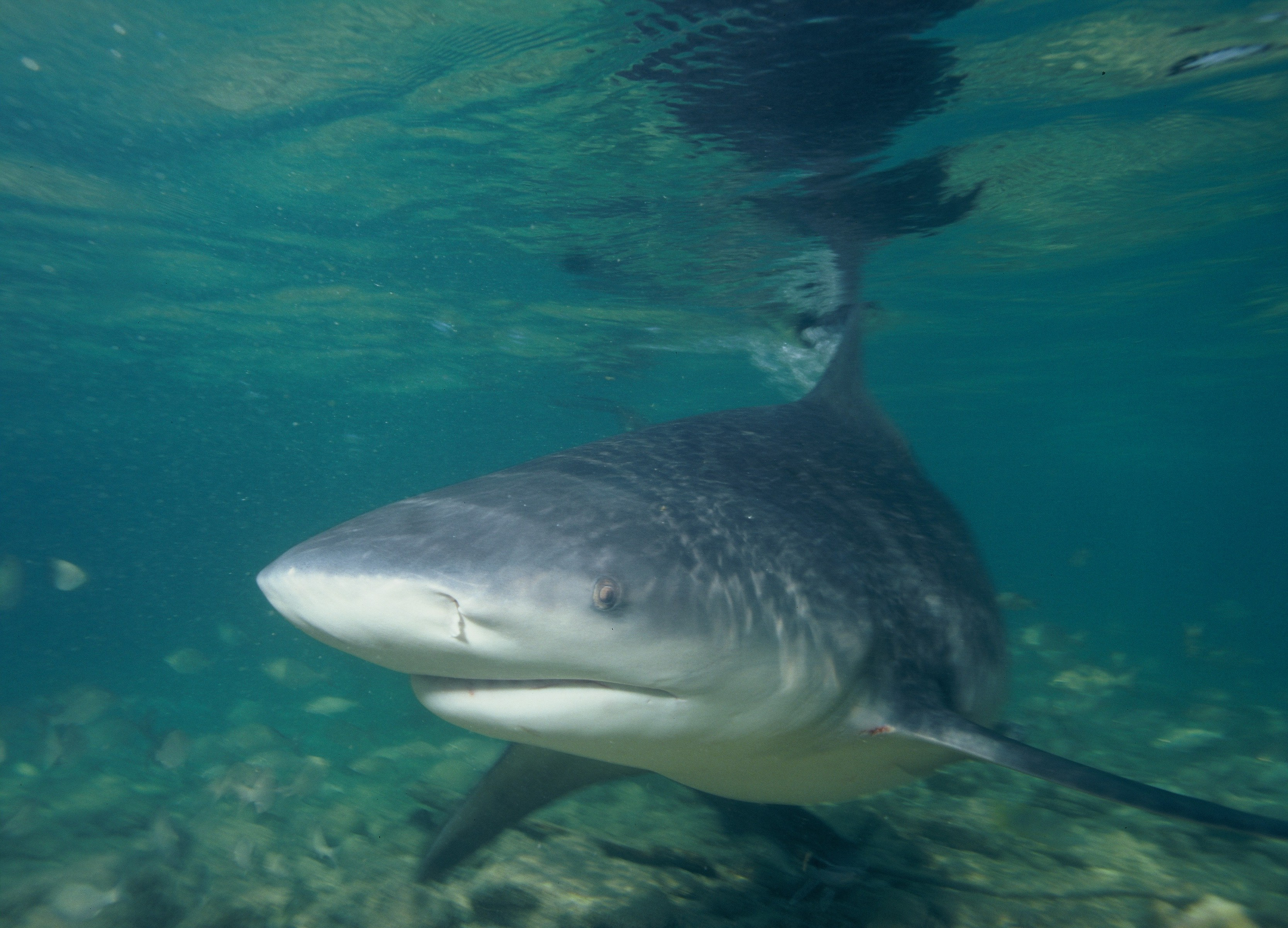
The bull shark ranks as the third most fatal in unprovoked attacks

== Media impact ==
The Jersey Shore shark attacks of 1916 killed four people in the first two weeks of July 1916 along the New Jersey shore and Matawan Creek in New Jersey. They are generally credited as the beginning of media attention on shark attacks in the United States of America.

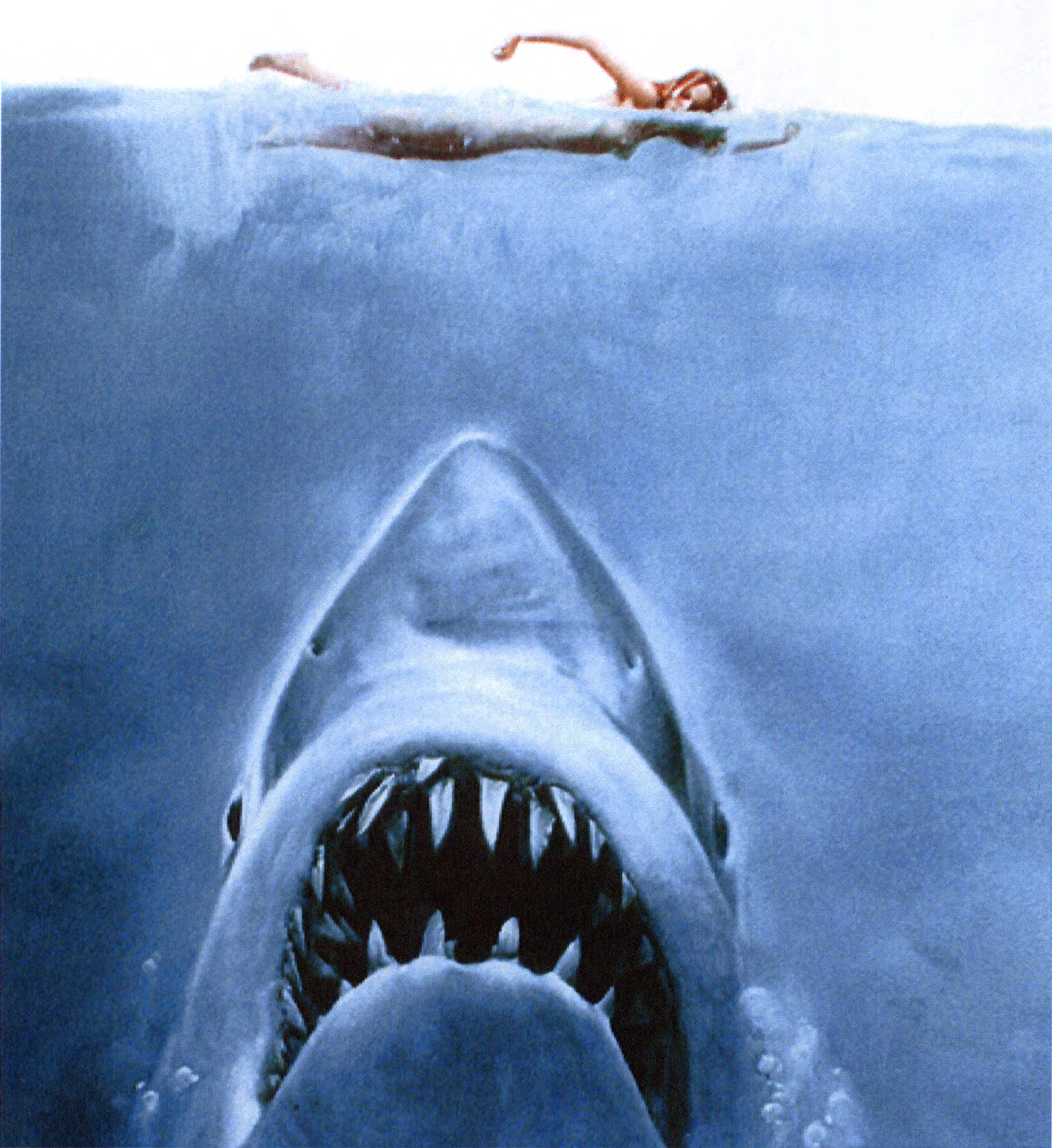
The film Jaws gave viewers an unrealistic view of shark attacks

Media portrayals such as the 1975 film Jaws were the cause of large-scale hunting and killing of thousands of sharks. Jaws had a significant impact on people and gave them an unrealistic view of sharks, causing them to fear them more than they probably should. The media has continued to exploit this fear by sensationalizing attacks and portraying sharks as vicious man-eaters.

After three shark attacks on Americans in July 2001, news media in the United States were accused of giving excessive focus to reports of shark attacks, to increase readership and ratings. The period became known as the Summer of the Shark.

In 2010 nine Australian survivors of shark attacks banded together to promote a more positive view of sharks. The survivors made particular note of the role of the media in distorting the fear of sharks. There are some television shows, such as Shark Week, that are dedicated to the preservation of these animals. They demonstrate, through scientific studies, that sharks are not interested in attacking humans and generally mistake humans as prey. A 2013 paper by Robert Hueter and Christopher Neff analyzed how shark attacks were covered in the Australian press. They found that 38% of reported "shark attacks" the shark did not touch the human. It simply swam near a human.

== Notable shark attacks and victims ==
- Tsukumo No. 24 ca. 1200 BC, world's oldest documented shark attack victim
- George Coulthard (1856–1883), Australian cricketer and Australian rules footballer
- Rodney Fox (b. 1940), Australian filmmaker and conservationist
- Bethany Hamilton (b. 1990), American surfer
- Mathieu Schiller (1979–2011), French body-boarder
- Brook Watson (1735–1807), British soldier and Lord Mayor of London
- Mick Fanning (b. 1981), Australian professional surfer
- USS Indianapolis July–August 1945
- NOAAS Discoverer (R 102) March 23, 1994
- Tamayo Perry (1975–2024), American professional surfer

== See also ==
- 2010 Sharm el-Sheikh shark attacks
- List of fatal shark attacks in Australia
- List of fatal shark attacks in the United States
- List of shark attacks in South Africa
- Lists of fatal shark attacks in South Africa
- Red Triangle (Pacific Ocean)
- Shark attack prevention
- Shark attacks in Australia
- Shark attacks in South Australia
- Shark culling
- Western Australian shark cull
