= Shark attacks in South Australia =

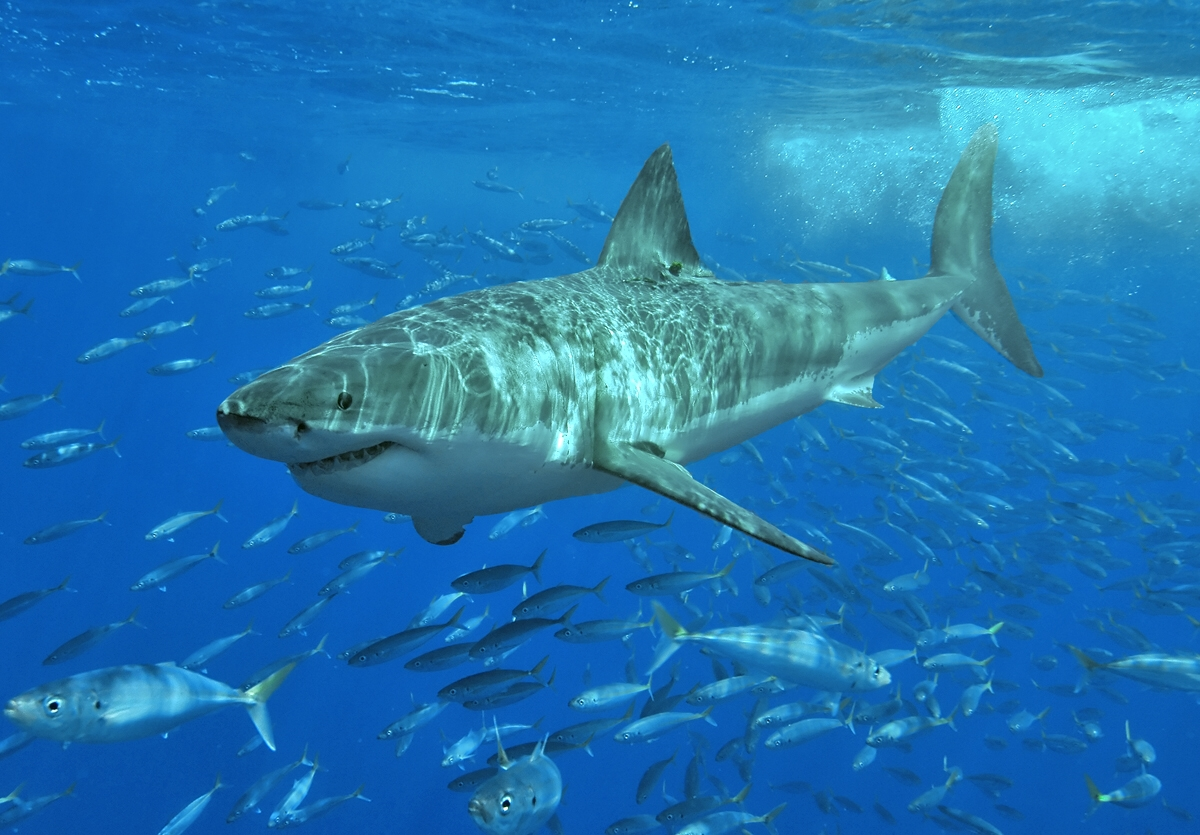
Many of South Australia's fatal shark attacks have been attributed to the great white shark

A total of 24 people have been killed by sharks in South Australian waters since the establishment of the colony in 1836. Prior to 2014, there had been 82 recorded shark attacks in South Australia. 20 of those have involved a single fatality. Victims were involved in a range of aquatic activities, including surfing, diving, spear-fishing, snorkeling, boating and swimming. Six of the fatalities occurred off the coast of greater metropolitan Adelaide, with the remainder distributed across South Australia's extensive coastline. Many of the fatal attacks have been attributed to great white sharks.

== 2020-present ==
There were no fatal shark attacks anywhere in South Australia during the years 2015 through 2022 (in a presumed attack in January 2021, it was later concluded that the man had died of natural causes before being scavenged by a shark). Three surfers were killed by sharks in separate incidents in 2023, and one in 2025. The four surfers all died in remote locations while surfing or swimming at a surf break.

- On 13 May 2023, Simon Baccanello was killed by a shark while surfing at Walker's Rocks, near Elliston, on the western coast of Eyre Peninsula.
- On 21 October 2023, 55 year old Tod Gendle was killed by a great white shark while swimming at a surf break at Granites Beach, near Streaky Bay on the west coast of Eyre Peninsula. Though a popular surfing spot, the location is also known as a potential breeding area for great white sharks.
- On 28 December 2023, Khai Cowley was killed by a Great White shark while surfing at Ethel Wreck Beach, near Marion Bay on the south west coast of Yorke Peninsula.
- On 2 January 2025, 28 year old Lance Appleby was killed by a shark, while surfing at Granites Beach near Streaky Bay (the same location as the October 2023 attack).

== 2001–2020 ==
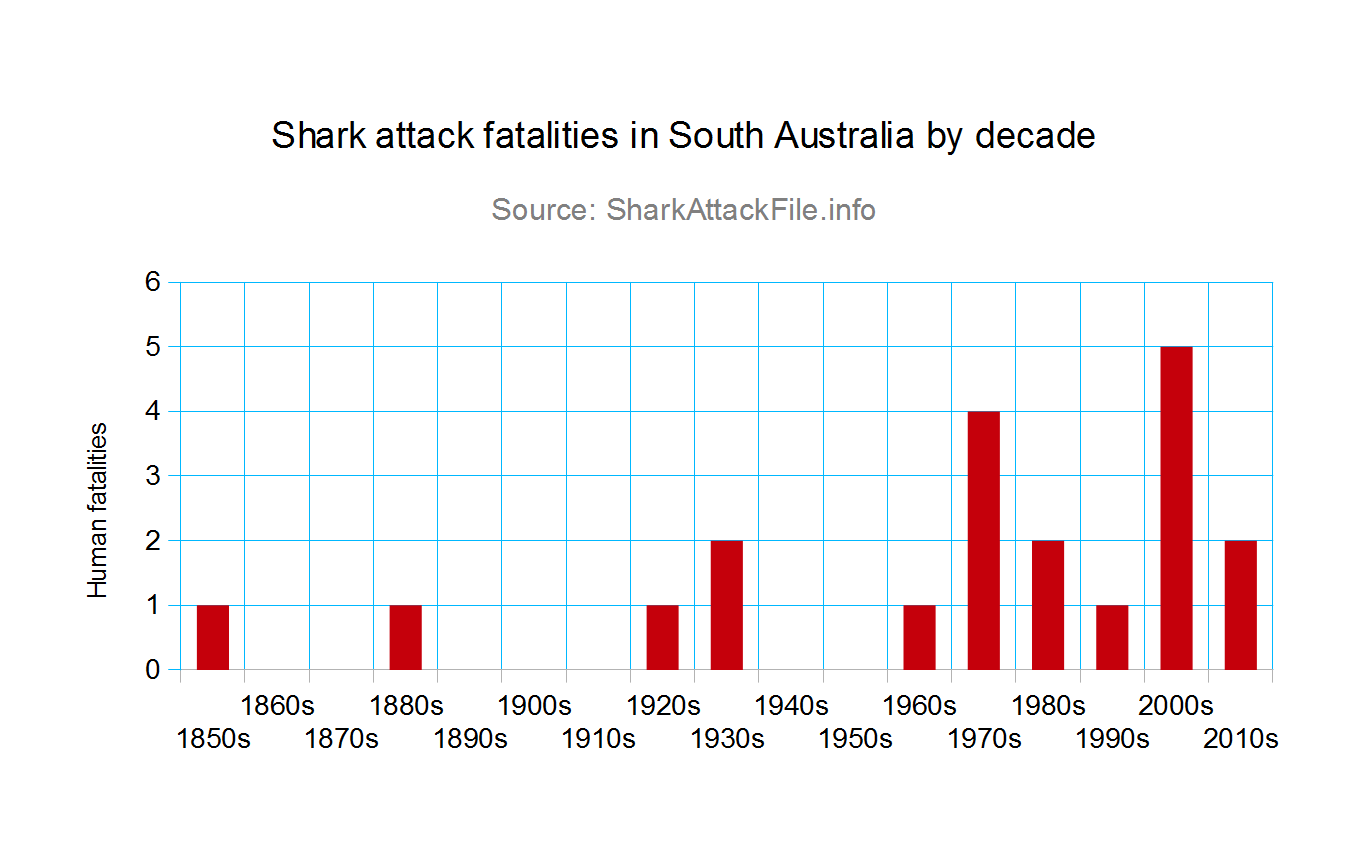
Graph of fatal shark attacks in South Australia by decade (1850–2014)

Five fatal shark attacks occurred in South Australian waters between the year 2001 and 2020. All fatal attacks have been attributed to great white sharks.

- On 8 February 2014, 28-year-old Sam Kellett was killed while spear-fishing 100 metres (330 feet) off Locksmith Beach near Edithburgh on Yorke Peninsula. His spear-gun and lead weights were recovered but his body was not. He had planned to compete in a spear-fishing competition there the following day. Berleying to attract fish was permitted for the competition. The competition registration form warned "Divers please be aware burleying can encourage shark activity, so should be used with caution." The proposed competition was cancelled following the attack.
- On 17 February 2011, Peter Clarkson was killed while diving for abalone off Perforated Island, near Coffin Bay. He was attacked by two sharks. The incident was observed by the captain of the vessel he was working from. Clarkson had had another close encounter with a single great white shark the previous August.
- On 24 August 2005, 23-year-old marine biologist Jarrod Stehbens was killed while scuba diving on the Glenelg tyre reef. He was collecting cuttlefish eggs for research. The shark was approximately 5 metres (16.5 feet) long. Jarrod's father said that Jarrod would not have wanted the shark involved in the attack to be killed.
- On 16 December 2004, 18-year-old Nick Peterson was killed off West Beach. He had been playing with friends who were towing a surfboard along behind a dinghy. He was taken while in the water, awaiting his next ride 300 metres (980 feet) offshore. His friends called for the shark to be destroyed, but Nick's father stated "We do not advocate the indiscriminate killing of sharks. They are to be admired and appreciated and respected, and Nick knew that."
- On 30 April 2002, 23-year-old Paul Buckland was killed at Smoky Bay on the western coast of Eyre Peninsula. He had been diving for scallops.

== 1951–2000 ==
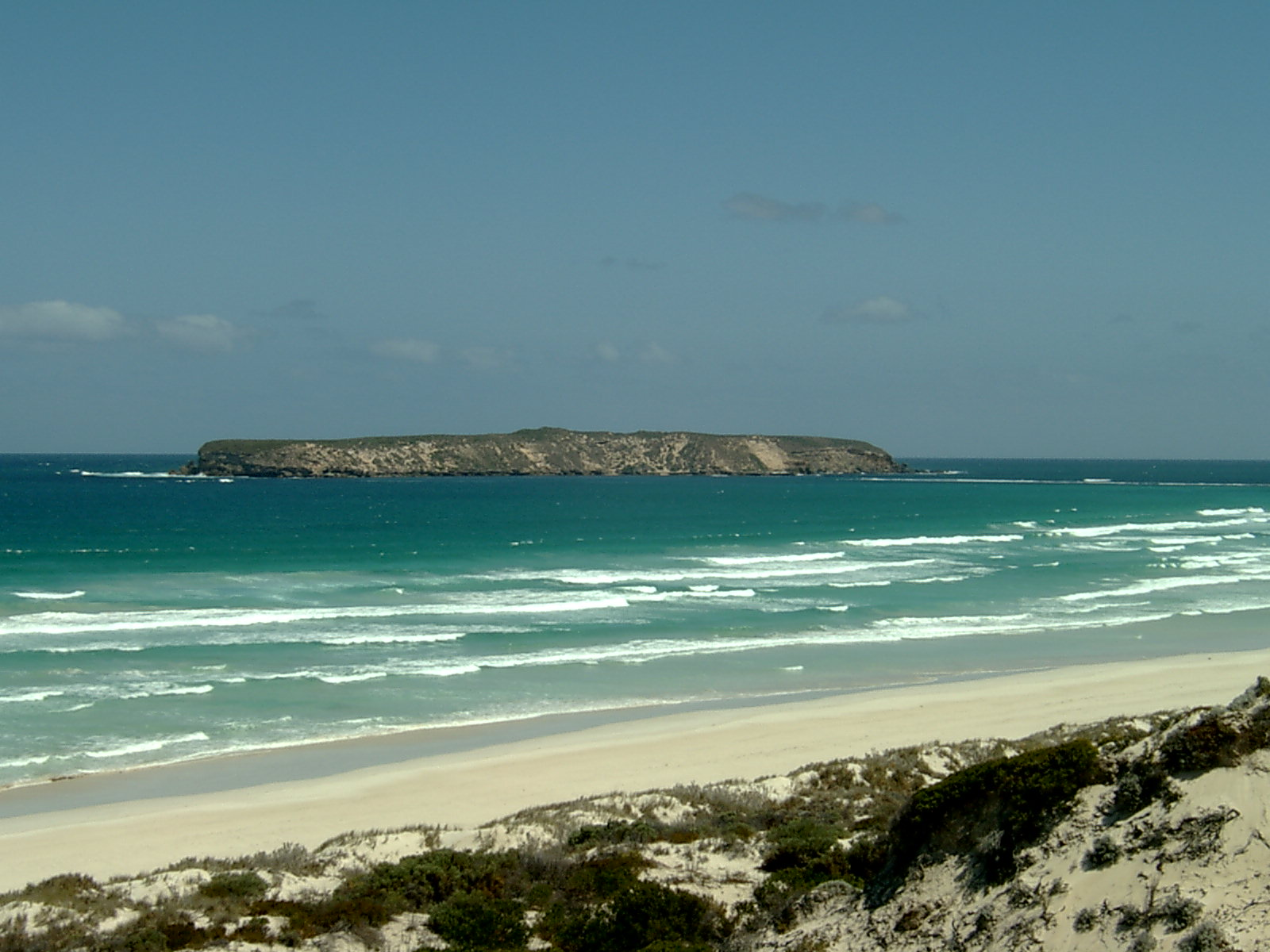
Two fatal shark attacks have occurred near Coffin Bay (1975 and 2011).

13 fatal shark attacks occurred in South Australian waters between these years. Most attack species remain unknown, although all attacks between 1992 and 2000 were attributed to great white sharks.

- On 25 September 2000, 17-year-old Jevan Wright was killed while surfing at Blackfellows Point near Elliston on Eyre Peninsula. During an inquest in February 2001 the Coroner stated "All experienced surfers, particularly people who surf on the West Coast of South Australia, must be aware of the risk, however remote, of shark attack." The coroner's report also noted that "Mr Geoff Wright, Jevan's father, also made some very sensible observations about the frequency of shark attacks and ways in which this phenomenon might be minimised." His observations related to tuna farming in Boston Bay and salmon fishing.
- On 24 September 2000, 25-year-old New Zealander Cameron Bayes was taken while surfing at Cactus Beach south of Penong on the Great Australian Bight.
- On 29 May 1999, 22-year-old Tony Donoghue was attacked and killed, believed to be by a great white shark, while windsurfing at Hardwicke Bay.
- On 28 June 1998, Douglas Chesher was fatally attacked at Neptune Islands while diving for abalone.
- On 8 September 1991, 19-year-old Jonathon Lee was attacked and killed while scuba diving at Snapper Point, Aldinga Beach.
- On 9 March 1989, 27-year-old Matthew Foale was attacked and killed while surfing at Waitpinga Beach, Waitpinga.
- On 18 September 1987, 47-year-old Terrance Gibson was attacked and killed while scuba diving off Marino Rocks.
- On 3 March 1985, 33-year-old Shirley Anne Durdin was attacked and killed while snorkeling at Wiseman's Beach in Peake Bay near Port Lincoln.
- On 10 February 1975, 12-year-old Wade Shippard was attacked by a great white shark while swimming at Point Sinclair near Penong at 6pm.
- On 20 January 1975, 17-year-old David Barrowman was taken by a shark while surfing at Coffin Bay. His body was not recovered.
- On 9 January 1974, 26-year-old Terry Manuel was attacked by a great white shark while diving at Streaky Bay on the west coast of Eyre Peninsula.
- On 5 September 1971, 51-year-old Leslie Oswald Harris suffered a shark bite while fishing in Blanch Harbour near Port Augusta. The bite was a minor injury, but he suffered a heart attack afterwards and died six hours later.
- On 9 December 1962, 16-year-old Geoffrey Martin Corner was attacked by a shark and killed while spear-fishing at Carrickalinga Head on Fleurieu Peninsula.

== 1901–1950 ==
Three fatal shark attacks were recorded during this period, and there were no recorded attacks for over 25 years (1937–1962).

- On 2 February 1937, crewman Lars Rasmussen of the Penang was lost near Port Germein when a 12-foot (3.7-metre) long dinghy capsized in rough seas. His body was later seen in the jaws of a shark, though it is unknown whether he drowned or died as a result of a shark attack.
- On 22 January 1936, 13-year-old Ray Bennett was taken by a shark at West Beach near Adelaide at about 6pm.
- On 17 March 1926, Mrs Primrose Whyte was killed while swimming near the jetty at Brighton Beach. The shark was believed most likely to have been a great white shark. Mrs Whyte had been a children's swimming instructor and was memorialized with the erection of a granite drink fountain on The Esplanade.

== 1836–1900 ==
Between the years 1836 and 1900 (i.e. within the Colony of South Australia), only two fatal shark attacks were recorded.

- On 14 January 1884, Miss Warren, daughter of Captain Ben Warren, fell overboard from the Bellona and was taken by two sharks. The vessel was one hour out from Port Pirie near Eastern Shoal in Spencer Gulf.
- On 28 March 1855, Captain Coleman's son was taken by a shark after falling overboard from the sailing ship Sobella near Port Wakefield on Gulf St. Vincent. Witnesses saw a shark swim by with the young boy's body in its jaws.

== See also ==
- List of fatal shark-incidents in Australia
- Western Australian shark cull
