= List of fatal shark attacks in South Africa =

This is a list of recorded fatal shark attacks in South African territorial waters, in reverse chronological order, including cases that were immediately, eventually or presumably fatal.

== 2020s ==
Name, age	Date	Location	Species	Details
Janine Lochrenberg, 65	2026-10-20	Orient Beach, Eastern Cape	unknown, suspected Great white	Janine Lochrenberg was swimming with an open water club when she was attacked. She sustained bites to her thigh and upper arm. Fellow swimmers brought her to the beach, but she died from blood loss before reaching the shore.
Kimon “Kiki” Bisogno, 39	2022-09-25	Plettenberg Bay, Western Cape	Great white	Just before 8 a.m. Bisogno entered the water for an early morning swim with her husband and five-year old daughter. She was in waist-deep water 2 to 3 waves from the beach when a 4.0 metres (13 ft) white shark grabbed her. Witnesses heard her scream as the shark took her underwater. The National Sea Rescue Institute was alerted, launched a rescue vessel and found her body around 46 metres (50 yd) from where she was attacked.
Bruce Wolov, 63	2022-06-28	Plettenberg Bay, Western Cape	Great white	Bruce Wolov was swimming in the Bay when a white shark attacked him. A large Great white was filmed swimming in the area shortly after the attack.
Robert Frauenstein, 38	2021-04-13	Chintsa, Eastern Cape	Great white	Frauenstein was bodyboarding alone. His body was never recovered, but his board was found with teeth marks believed to be from a 'huge' great white.

== 2010s ==
Name, age	Date	Location	Species	Details
Sivuyile Xelela, 34	2017-09-03	Dyer Island, Western Cape	Great white	Xelela was swimming with a group of poachers to Dyer Island to poach abalone. He was swimming a few meters in front of the group when a shark grabbed him, pulled him underwater, and resurfaced with him in its jaws. The group swam away, and Xelela's body was later retrieved by a rescue boat.
Leopold Mairhuber, 68	2017-04-12	Protea Banks, KwaZulu-Natal	unknown	Mairhuber was an experienced master scuba instructor, diving with a charter group. Once the group surfaced, they realized Mairhuber was missing. According to some reports only his legs and pieces of his wetsuit were recovered. A coroner was unable to determine whether or not he had died first before the attack.
Friedrich Burgstaller, 66	2014-03-22	Port St. Johns, Eastern Cape	Bull	Burgstaller was standing in waist-deep water at Second Beach, when the shark attacked, biting his leg. He started to wade to shore, but fell. Burgstaller tried to punch the shark, but his arm went straight into the sharks mouth, and the shark severed it. A current then swept him out from shore. He tried to swim back with only one arm, but succumbed to his injuries. They saw his body floating to shore, and retrieved it. His arm was severed, and a large part of his body below the waist was gone. An expert suggested a bull, about 2.0 metres (6.5 ft) in length.
Burgert van der Westhuizen, 74	2013-10-11	Jeffery's Bay, Eastern Cape	Great white	This attack took place at Lower point, while Van der Westhuizen was swimming. Witnesses saw a commotion in the water and then a shark attacking a body. A witness paddled out on his kayak to see a shark eating a body. Then, the NSRI retrieved the body. It is believed the shark responsible was a Great white, about 4 meters in length.
Liya Sibili, 20	2012-12-25	Port St. Johns, Eastern Cape	Tiger	This attack took place at Second Beach. Lifeguards saw a shark fin and tried to get everyone out of the water, but Sibili was farther out. Witnesses saw him get bitten by a shark, and the water turned red with blood. Lifeguards did not immediately enter the water because they were scared of the shark. Sibili's body was never recovered, only his swimming trunks were found.
David Lilienfeld, 20	2012-04-19	False Bay, Western Cape	Great white	This incident took place at Dappat Se Gat. Lilienfeld was lying on his bodyboard when a shark fin appeared. Lilienfeld tried to fight off the shark, but it bit his leg. He was pulled ashore, but by the time paramedics reached him, he was dead. He died from blood loss after his leg was severed at the hip. It is believed the shark responsible was a white shark, about 4.6 metres (15 ft) in length.
Lungisani Msungubana, 25	2012-01-15	Port St. Johns, Eastern Cape	Bull	This attack took place at Second Beach. Msungubana was in waist-deep water with his friends when the shark attacked him. He tried to fight back while others rushed from the water. Lifeguards came and put him on a surfboard to use as a stretcher, but he died on his way to the hospital. He had lacerations to his right torso, shoulder, arm, and leg.
Tim van Heerden, 49	2011-08-23	Keurbooms River Mouth, Western Cape	Great white	This attack took place at Lookout Beach. Van Heerden was surfing and spotted a shark and yelled to other people surfing. The shark pulled him off his board. When trying to get back on his surfboard, the shark pulled him under again. A surfer came to his aid, and pulled him onto shore. He was able to get to the hospital alive, but died later. He died after having two bites- one on his thigh, and one on the groin. His femoral artery was severed. The involved white shark was about 2.4 metres (8 ft) in length.
Warren Smart, 28	2011-05-21	Leven Point, KwaZulu-Natal	Bull	Warren Smart was spear fishing at a depth of about 12 meters. He was trying to remove a fish from a hook when a shark bit his thigh. People on his support boat pulled him on and started for shore. When they did reach shore, paramedics were there and tried to stop the blood from coming out, but he died. He had severe lacerations along his thigh.
Zama Ndamase, 16	2011-01-15	Port St. Johns, Eastern Cape	Bull	This attack took place at Second Beach. Ndamase was surfing with a surf club when a shark bit him. He tried to reach shore, but bled to death before he made it out of the water. He died after the shark bit his left thigh and severed his femoral artery .
Khanyisile Momoza, 29	2010-09-21	Dyer Island, Western Cape	Great white	Momoza was swimming back to the mainland in a group after collecting abalone from Dyer Island. A shark grabbed him and pulled him under the surface. Too scared for their lives, the rest of the group swam to shore and told authorities what had happened.
Lloyd Skinner, 37	2010-01-12	Fish Hoek, Western Cape	Great white	Skinner was standing in chest-deep water in False Bay when a white shark bit him. Skinner signaled for help. The shark then pulled him under the water. When he surfaced the shark bit him again. Helicopters and boats were then sent out to find him, but couldn't.

== 2000s ==
Name, age	Date	Location	Species	Details
Tshintshekile Nduva, 22	2009-12-18	Port St. Johns, Eastern Cape	Zambezi	This attack took place at Second Beach. Nduva was paddle boarding. His hands shot up as a shark pulled him under the water. His body was found almost a week later.
Gerhard van Zyl, 25	2009-08-29	Glentana, Western Cape	Great white	Van Zyl was surfing with a friend when a shark grabbed him and pulled him off his board. Van Zyl surfaced and his friend and another surfer pulled him to shore and wrapped a wetsuit around his wound. He was then flown to a hospital, where he was pronounced dead. He died after getting his leg severed below the knee. The shark involved was a 4-meter white shark.
Luyolo Mangele, 16	2009-03-21	Port St. Johns, Eastern Cape	Bull	Mangele was in the water surfing with others when he screamed and a pool of red water surrounded him. A surfing instructor and lifeguard pulled him from the water, but he died 30 minutes late after being bitten on the thighs and buttocks.
Sikhanyiso Bangilizwe, 27	2009-01-24	Port St. Johns, Eastern Cape	unconfirmed, either a tiger or bull	Bangilizwe was swimming with friends when he was attacked. The shark severed his right arm, shoulder, and part of his back and buttock.
Nkosinathi Mayaba, 21	2009-01-13	Gansbaai, Western Cape	Great white	While poachers were at Dyer Islandpoaching abalone, Mayaba was killed by a white shark.
Sibulele Masiza, 24	2007-01-14	Port St. Johns, Eastern Cape	Tiger	Masiza went bodyboarding alone. He was never seen again, but his shredded swim fin washed ashore later. An expert suggested a Tiger shark.
Lorenzo Kroutz, 17	2006-03-22	Port Alfred, Eastern Cape	unknown	Kroutz had been swimming with friends when he was swept out to sea by a current. The next day, his body washed up on shore with shark bites out of him. He could have drowned before being consumed.
unknown	2005-08-14	Cape Town, Western Cape	unknown	Someone was walking along the beach when they came across a foot floating in the water, severed above the ankle. It looked as if something chewed it off. Many people believe the foot was from a shark attack victim.
Henri Murray, 22	2005-06-04	Millers's Point, Western Cape	Great white	This attack took place at False Bay. Murray was spearfishing with a friend when he saw a shark. The shark grabbed him and pulled him under the water. The shark swam away. His friend swam to shore to get help. Fishermen and emergency services then started searching the area. The attack was witnessed by people on shore. Several of Murray's belongings were recovered, including his spear gun and swim fin, but they never found his body. Witnesses estimated the shark to be 4.9 metres (16 ft) long.
Tyna Webb, 77	2004-11-15	Fish Hoek Beach, Western Cape	Great white	Webb was swimming when a shark grabbed and pulled her under the surface. The shark then started to swim to sea with Webb in its mouth, leaving only a red swim cap and a pool of red water. The attack was witnessed by several people on shore. Emergency services were called by a witness and they started searching for her. They never found her body, but a helicopter saw a large shark in the water. Surrounding beaches were closed. The shark was estimated to be 5.5 to 6.1 metres (18 to 20 ft) long.
Nkosinathi Mayaba, 21	2004-06-02	Pearly Beach, Western Cape	Great white	A poacher, Mayaba was swimming to shore with a group after poaching abalone from Dyer Island. A shark grabbed him and ripped off his leg. The others swam back to shore and told authorities. His body was found several days later.
Seldon Jee, 21	2003-11-27	Sodwana Bay, KwaZulu-Natal	unconfirmed, possibly tiger	Jee was spearfishing with two friends when he disappeared. The police were notified and boats were soon sent out to look for him. They did not find his whole body, but did find a hand and some wetsuit material. Since he was free diving and not using Scuba, he could have drowned and then be consumed. A 4- meter tiger was observed in the area.
David Bornman, 19	2003-09-12	Noordhoek, Western Cape	unknown	Bornman was boogie boarding with his friends when a shark grabbed him and pulled him under. The shark let go. While the rest went to the beach, Bornman rode a wave to shore. There, rescue personnel tried to save him, but he had lost too much blood, and died. The bite extended from his left ribcage to the buttock. The body-board was "ripped to pieces."

== 1990s ==
Name, age	Date	Location	Species	Details
Hercules Pretorius, 15	1999-07-15	Buffels Bay, Western Cape	unknown	Pretorius was body boarding with friends when they noticed blood in the water. His friends pulled him to shore and medical personnel arrived, but by the time they could reach Pretorius, he was dead. He died after a bite on his right side.
Anton de Vos, 20	1998-06-22	Gonubie Point, Eastern Cape	Great white	De Vos was boogie boarding when a shark bit him on the right calf and left thigh. Both of his hands were lacerated. That afternoon, his left leg was surgically amputated above the knee. However, due to the massive loss of blood, he died the following afternoon.
Mr. M, 28	1998 Summer	Transkei, Eastern Cape	Great white	Mr. M was surfing with friends at Hole-In-The-Wall when he was attacked by a shark. They found his body an hour later with a right leg severed, along with a severed artery on the left leg.
Ian James Hill, 39	1997-12-28	Pringles Bay, Western Cape	unconfirmed, probably Great white	Hill was spearfishing when witnesses saw a fin stick out the water, followed by turbulence and blood in the water. Despite looking, Hill's body was never recovered.
Mark Penches, 25	1997-07-21	Ntlonyana, Eastern Cape	Great white	Penches was surfing at Breezy Point when a shark attacked him. Witnesses saw a patch of blood in the water that widened. Witnesses then saw a shark swimming out to sea. After retrieving the body, people tried to revive him, but it did not help, and he died.
Mthokozisi Cedrick Mpanza, 14	1995-01-24	Isipingo Beach, KwaZulu-Natal	Tiger	Mpanza was conducting training exercises at Tiger Rocks when a shark dragged him underwater. During the incident, fellow lifesaver Ashraf Shaik entered the shark infested water and attempted to rescue him. Lifesavers initiated CPR, and paramedics attempted resuscitation for nearly an hour, but he was pronounced dead on the beach. He died from blood loss after his right femoral artery was severed.
Bruce Corby, 22	1994-07-09	East London, Eastern Cape	Great white	Corby was surfing at Nahoon Reef when a shark grabbed his leg. Another surfer pulled him to shore. They put a tourniquet around his stump and waited till the ambulance came. He died at the hospital later. He died from blood loss after his leg was severed above the knee.
Gabriel Francois de Wet Ries, 29	1994-04-02	Arniston, Western Cape	Great white	De Wet Ries was spearfishing when he disappeared. Initially, it was thought he drowned, but pieces of his wetsuit were found, bearing cuts. It appeared as if someone was wearing the hood of the wetsuit at the time of the attack. If he had been alive at the time of the attack, the attack would have been fatal.
Monique Price, 21	1990-06-24	Mossel Bay, Western Cape	Great white	Price was diving to recover an anchor with others when a shark grabbed her left thigh and pulled her under the surface. When she surfaced, her diving partners pulled her onto the support boat. They gave her first aid and radioed for an ambulance to meet them when they reached land. She was quickly taken to the hospital, but by the time they reached, she was dead. She died from blood loss after having severe injuries to her left thigh, including having her femoral and popliteal arteries severed.

== 1980s ==
Name, age	Date	Location	Species	Details
Gerjo van Niekerk, 29	1989-11-18	Melkbosstrand, Western Cape	Great white	Van Niekerk was spearfishing and freediving alone when he disappeared. A few days later, his shark-bitten leg was washed up ashore. Beside that, his body was not recovered. Two months before that, Van Niekerk had been non-fatally attacked by a shark.
Richardt Anton Olls, 21	1986-12-22	Suid-Afrikaanse Onderwysers Unie Strand, Western Cape	Great white	Olls was boogie boarding when he yelled he was bitten by a shark. His friend who was with him paddled to the beach and got two lifesavers who pulled him to shore. He was given first aid, but they soon realized he needed to get to the hospital. He died en route to the hospital. He bled out after a bite on his left leg severed his femoral artery. The teeth marks on his wound indicated a white shark, at least 3.0 metres (10 ft) long.
Adrian Hayman	1984-07-22	Cape Point, Western Cape	unknown	This attack took place during a spearfishing competition. Other competitors soon noticed that Hayman was missing. Despite looking, they only found his speargun. The divers then argued whether or not he died from drowning. A month later, his shark-bitten body washed ashore. However, it is likely that Hayman drowned before sharks attacked him.
a Black man, between 25 and 30	1983-01-11	Amanzimtoti, KwaZulu-Natal	Multiple sharks	On the morning of January 15, 1983, a body of a black man washed ashore. Most of the body had been devoured by sharks. It appeared a shark had bit his foot when he was alive. However, it is unknown if this is what caused his death, as he could have drowned before he was bitten.
Alex Macun, 27	1982-06-29	Ntlonyana Bay, Eastern Cape	Great white	Macun was surfing when two other surfers heard him shout. They looked to the direction they heard the voice and saw Macun get pulled off his board. Over the next hour, they watched the victim get viciously attacked by the shark, and with all the blood in the water, attracting even more sharks into the area. A shark eventually swam away from shore with what was left of the body. Macun's body was never recovered. The shark involved was a white shark, about 2.4 metres (8 ft) in length and weighing about over 180 kilograms (400 lb).
Ray Booth, 52	1980-03-30	Umdhloti, KwaZulu-Natal	Tiger	Ray Booth disappeared while cray fishing with his son. The next day, the search team found Booth's mostly devoured body. The wounds seemed to be inflicted by a tiger. However, he could have drowned first.

== 1970s ==
Name, age	Date	Location	Species	Details
Alan Symons	1979-05-03	Mabibi, KwaZulu-Natal	unknown	Symons was part of a Scuba diving class. They planned to snorkel out to where they planned to dive. However, when the rest of the group reached the location, they noticed Symons was missing. When the group failed to find him, an official search started. Six days after the attack, a part of the wetsuit was found, showing marks of a shark biting it. Assuming the person wearing the wetsuit was alive at the time of the shark bites, it would result in death. However, it is unknown if Symons was alive at the time of the bites, or if he was even in the wetsuit. The body of Symons was never found.
Phillip Steenkamp, 23	1978-12-12	Sodwana, KwaZulu-Natal	Great white	Steenkamp was spearfishing with a friend when a shark grabbed him by the legs and started thrashing him around. His friend shot the shark with a speargun, and the shark swam off. His friend then pulled him to shore, but he bled to death before reaching the beach. The sharks single bite severed both arteries in his thighs. The shark involved was a white shark, about 2.3 metres (7.5 ft) long and weighing 210 kilograms (460 lb).
Mr. Kuppasamy	1978-10-21	St. Lucia Estuary, KwaZulu-Natal	Tiger	Kuppasamy was fishing with his nephew. At night, his nephew went to cook dinner while Kuppasamy was still fishing. However, he failed to return. The next day, his nephew reported this and officials soon started searching the area. At his fishing spot, they found signs of a struggle. Campers in the area also reported that they heard screams the night he disappeared. Later, his body was found, covered in shark bites. It is unknown if those shark bites were inflicted before or after his death.
Crewman of the Alan S	1973-09-29	Mission Rocks, KwaZulu-Natal	unknown	This unidentified man was being pulled to shore after the wreck of the Alan S. He was holding onto a rope when a shark pulled him under the water. His shark-bitten body washed ashore later.
Jacob Nkomo, 20	1972-01-01	St. Georgeâs Strand, Eastern Cape	unknown	Nkomo was swimming with his brother when he disappeared. His body was found later. His body was so badly bitten by sharks that it was impossible to tell if he drowned first or was attacked first.
Theo Klein	1971-04-11	Buffels Bay, Western Cape	Great white	Witnesses heard Klein yell "Shark" and start swimming to shore, but lost consciousness. Surfers went out to help him, but after they realized the shark was in the water, they paddled back to shore. The shark then continued to feed on the body. They later recovered his body.

== 1960s ==
Name, age	Date	Location	Species	Details
Chester Graham Wienand, 18	1963-12-25	Gonubie Beach, Eastern Cape	unknown	Weinand, his sister, and two other swimmers saw a shark. A lifesaver was able to get three of the swimmers to the beach, but Wienand was still in the water. A lifesaver threw Wienand a lifeline and started pulling him to shore, but he disappeared. Wienand's body washed up the next day. His body was covered in shark bites. His cause of death was ruled a shark attack.
Matanguza Mzize, 15	1963-12-20	Umvoti, KwaZulu-Natal	Bull	Mzize was playing in the surf with friends when a shark bit his calf. He fell down and the shark severed his arm below the elbow. It then bit his chest and abdomen. His body washed ashore, but by then, he was dead.
Clifford Hoogvorst, 22	1962-02-07	Winkelspruit, KwaZulu-Natal	Bull	Hoogvorst was on his back swimming to shore. By the time he reached the beach, he was too weak to pull himself from the water. His friend pulled him out. Hoogvorst was breathing when he was pulled ashore, but then passed out while being given first aid. They were unable to revive him. He had a severe bite on his right calf.
Reece F. Nielsen, 13	1962-02-05	Winkelspruit, KwaZulu-Natal	unknown, experts are divided between bull, great white, and tiger	Nielsen was treading water waiting for a wave to bodysurf on with friends when he shouted he was attacked by a shark. The shark then shook him, but he was able to fight off the shark and a friend pulled him to shore, but he lost consciousness before he reached the beach. He died within three minutes of reaching shore. Most of the tissue from his thigh to his knee was removed.
Geoffrey Zimmerman, 14	1961-02-01	Nahoon Beach, Eastern Cape	unknown, speculated to be bull, great white, or even mako shark	Zimmerman was swimming when a shark grabbed his leg. He fought off the shark, the water turning red with blood. His friends pulled him to shore and he received first aid. He was put into an ambulance, but was dead on the arrival to the hospital. He died after sustaining several bites to both legs.
Serame Petrus Sithole, 25	1960-12-24	Margate, KwaZulu-Natal	Great white	Sithole was swimming when he suddenly screamed and got shoved out of the water by something. He then went limp. As he was floating to shore, someone grabbed his body. Sithole died before reaching the beach. His right leg was severed by the knee, and his left leg was severed at the thigh.

== 1950s ==
Name, age	Date	Location	Species	Details
Barry Geldenhuys, 14	1958-12-13	Mellbaai, Western Cape	unknown	Geldenhuys was swimming when he disappeared. No one witnessed the attack, but a human foot washed up several weeks later. Many authorities believed this to be Geldenhuys, as no one else was reported missing in the area.
Fay Jones Bester, 28	1958-04-05	Uvongo, KwaZulu-Natal	Great white	Bester was in shallow water when a shark rushed at her. The shark knocked her off her feet, and the water turned red. The shark grabbed Bester's waist and shook its head. The attack only lasted a few seconds, but by the time witnesses were able to pull her to shore, she was dead. Her left leg was nearly severed, and her abdomen was severely bitten. The witnesses have a description of a white shark, about 3 meters in length.
Nicholaas Francois Badenhorst, 29	1958-04-03	Port Edward, KwaZulu-Natal	Great white	BadenHorst was swimming with his brothers when he yelled "Shark" and the water turned red with blood. He tried to fight off the shark. A lifesaver grabbed Badenhorst, shoved away the shark, and took him to shore. However, he was dead by the time they reached the beach. He suffered bites on his right leg, right torso, a severed right arm at the elbow, and a severed left arm at the shoulder. The species involved was believed to be a white shark, about 4.0 metres (13 ft) in length.
Derryck Garth Prinsloo, 42	1958-01-09	Scotburgh, KwaZulu-Natal	dusky, tiger shark, or great white	Prinsloo was swimming when a shark bit him, removing a lot from his right thigh and shoving him out of the water. Prinsloo fell into the water, and the shark bit him again, this time nearly severing his left leg. He was quickly pulled to shore and given first aid, but was unconscious when put in an ambulance. He died en route to the hospital.
a young Zulu man	1958 circa	Kakatana River, KwaZulu-Natal	unknown, probably a bull	This young man was walking into the river to fish. A shark severely bit his left leg, severing it just above the knee. He later died from the injuries sustained by the bite.
Vernon James Berry, 23	1957-12-23	Margate, KwaZulu-Natal	Great white	Berry was swimming in a lagoon when a shark attacked him. He was still conscious when he was pulled to shore, but quickly lost consciousness. He died en route to the hospital. His injuries where a bite on the waist, bites all up his right arm, and a severed left hand.
Allen Green, 15	1957-12-20	Uvongo, KwaZulu-Natal	unknown	Green was swimming when he was attacked by a shark. He died from blood loss before being brought to shore. His injury was a severe shark bite to his chest and right arm.
Sydney Victor Williams, 12	1957-01-05	Umgeni River Mouth, KwaZulu-Natal	unknown	Williams was walking towards shore with his brother when he threw his arms up and disappeared under the water. His shark bitten body was recovered the next day.
a Zulu man	1955-01-15	St. Lucia Bay, KwaZulu-Natal	unconfirmed, likely bull	This unidentified man was killed was swimming across a bay. He bled to death after getting a severe bite on his leg.
Hendrie Nkwazi, 19	1951-01-21	Native Bathing Beach, KwaZulu-Natal	unknown	Nkwazi was swimming with two brothers when he screamed. By the time he was pulled shore, he was dead. He died from a bite on his right leg.
Brian Von Berg, 20	1950-03-08	Durban, KwaZulu-Natal	unknown	Von Berg was doing a life saving drill when he disappeared. He swam out to sea to act as a lifesaving dummy. He then started to wave his arms and shout. Someone swam out to him and called his name, but he did not respond. He appeared to be unconscious, with the water up to his nose. Then he sank. His body was never recovered. It is presumed he was taken by a shark.
Clive Heath Gordon Lewis Dumayne, 14	1950-02-11	Durban, KwaZulu-Natal	Great white	Dumayne was body surfing with friends when a shark's fin broke the surface and pulled him under the water. He surfaced once, screamed, and got pulled under again. His body was never recovered. His friends identified the shark as a white shark, about 3.7 metres (12 ft) long and weighing 640 kilograms (1,400 lb).

== 1940s ==
Name, age	Date	Location	Species	Details
Dennis Nissen, 19	1944-08-20	Margate, KwaZulu-Natal	Unknown	Nissen was swimming when a shark grabbed him by the leg, he screamed, and disappeared under the surface. They never found his body.
Albert Schmidt, 17	1944-07-22	Mossel Bay, Western Cape	Unconfirmed (ProbablyGreat white)	Witnesses saw a shark next to Schmidt, and heard him yell for help. He disappeared under the water and the water turned red with blood. Despite looking, his body was never recovered.
Geoffrey Best, 23	1944-03-26	Durban, KwaZulu-Natal	Unknown	Best was standing in North Beach when lifesavers saw him struggling in the water, with blood around him. Lifesavers pulled him to shore. He was taken to shore, but died.
Anthony Bunn, 22	1944-01-20	Durban, KwaZulu-Natal	Unknown	Bunn was body surfing with a friend when he seemed to struggle in the water. He started to swim to shore but collapsed on the way there. His friend brought him the rest of the way to the beach. He was taken to the hospital, but died from blood loss after his femoral artery was severed.
Ronald Joel Selby, 26	1944-01-04	Durban, KwaZulu-Natal	Unknown	Selby was swimming with his brother when he yelled he had been bitten by a shark. His brother and another person pulled him to shore. He was taken to a hospital, but died a few days later.
James Crawford Matthews, 17	1943-12-12	Amazimtoti, KwaZulu-Natal	Unknown	Matthews was body-surfing when a yelled a shark bit him. His companions took him to shore. He was taken to a hospital, but died shortly afterward. He had a severe bite on his upper right leg.
Eric Ridley, 31	1943-03-21	Durban, KwaZulu-Natal	Unknown	Ridley was swimming with a friend when he shouted for help. After difficulty, lifesavers pulled him to the beach, but he was unconscious. He died en route to the hospital. He had a bite on his thigh and both calves.
Willem Johannes Bergh, 18	1942-11-01	Clifton, Western Cape	Unconfirmed (Probably Great white)	Bergh was swimming with friends. He had only swum a few strokes when a shark grabbed him by the shoulder and thrusted him out of the air. Bergh was able to free himself and start swimming again, but the shark grabbed him by the torso, and blood shot up in the air. He was then pulled under the surface. He resurfaced, but then got pulled under again. Witnesses claimed they saw the shark swim out to sea with the body. A witness estimated the shark to be 5.2 metres (17 ft) long.
Desmond Chandley, 17	1940-12-20	Amanzimtoti, KwaZulu-Natal	Unknown	Chandley was swimming with friends when a shark bit him. He screamed and quickly swam to shore. He was given first aid and an ambulance was called. He was dead on arrival to the hospital due to blood loss. Chandley suffered multiple injuries to his legs and buttocks.
Joseph Lees, 25	1940-03-31	Winklespruit, KwaZulu-Natal	Great white	Lees was swimming with a lifesaving group, but was treading water when he yelled he was attacked. The members quickly pulled him to shore, and he was semi-conscious when he reached the beach. He was taken to a hospital, but was dead on arrival.
Leslie Plummer Lund, 17	1940-02-22	Amanzimtoti, KwaZulu-Natal	Unknown (Probably Great white)	Lund was swimming alone when he was attacked by a shark. He was able to reach the beach alone and received first aid. He was rushed to the hospital, but died the next day. He died after a severe bite to his thigh.
Frederick Aubrey Hooper, 17	1940-01-07	Warner Beach, KwaZulu-Natal	Unknown	Hooper was swimming to shore with two others when he yelled he saw a shark. Just then, a shark broke the surface and the water turned red with blood. Someone helped him onto a raft and he was pulled to shore. He was given first aid and an ambulance came about an hour later. He died the next day in the hospital. He had bad injuries to his right leg.
Indian woman	1940-04-23	Winkelspruit, KwaZulu-Natal	Unknown	A woman if Indian descent was attacked by a shark. Details are unknown.

== Before 1940 ==
Name, age	Date	Location	Species	Details
An Unknown Young Black Man	1934-04-01	Winklespruit, KwaZulu-Natal	Unknown	This unidentified man was swept away by a current. A lifesaver went out to rescue him, but when the rescuer was close to him, the man screamed and got pulled under the surface. Witnesses told the lifesaver that there was a shark. He was quickly pulled back to shore. The man's body was never recovered.
Mr. Meyer	1930-1932	Port Elizabeth, Eastern Cape	Unknown	A man named Meyer was "dreadfully mutilated" by a shark at North End Beach, according to locals.
Ockert Stephanus Heyns, 17	1927-12-28	Little Brak River, Western Cape	Great white	Heyns was swimming with three other people when a shark was spotted. The others made it to shore, but Heys was still in the water. The shark bit Heys twice, and then swam off. Witnesses quickly pulled him from the water. He was given first aid and taken to the hospital. He was semi-conscious on arrival. He died later that day. His left leg was severed a little above the knee and his right foot was also severed.
Johannes Karl Schultz, 22	1924-01-29	Durban, KwaZulu-Natal	Unknown	Schultz was swimming with two friends but was isolated at the time he was attacked. He started thrashing around, and then disappeared under the surface. Three days later, portions of a human body washed ashore. Although it is unconfirmed, many believe that to be the remains of Schultz. He may have drowned before being consumed.
James May, 64	1911-05-09	Victoria Bay, Western Cape	Unknown	According to newspapers, he was bathing when he was taken by sharks. His swimsuit, hat, jacket, vest and lower part of his body was found.
James Jantjes	1911-05-01	Mossel Bay, Western Cape	Unknown	Jantjes was swimming farther than all the other beachgoers when he threw his arm up in the air and got pulled beneath the surface. It is believed he was taken by a shark. His body was never recovered.
A Soldier	1909-06-26	Cape Town, Western Cape	Unknown (But likely Great White)	A shark was captured with human remains in its gut. The person was in full army uniform. The only body part missing was the arm. However, it is more likely that the soldier fell overboard, drowned, and was scavenged by a shark. The shark estimated to be 5.5 metres (18 ft) long.
Mr. East, 16	1908-12-31	Still Bay, Western Cape	Unknown	According to a newspaper, East was swimming with three other people when he got attacked by a shark. Some of his body was recovered two days later.
Ramdayal, 30	1906-01-20	Battery Beach, KwaZulu-Natal	Unknown	Ramdayal was washing horses with four other people when Ramdayal started to yell a fish was biting him. Two people had a tug-o-war battle with the shark until it let go. He was still alive when brought ashore. He was taken to the hospital, but died quickly after. A shark was caught with pieces of cloth on its teeth.
Erich Suppeman	1905-12-31	Durban, KwaZulu-Natal	Unknown	Supperman was floating waiting to catch a wave to bodysurf with his friend when he suddenly screamed. His friend looked at him and saw a shark had bit his chest. He then pulled Supperman to shore. He died after reaching the sand. He had bites on his left chest and arm, as well as a bite on his left thigh.
James Anderson, 26	1905-04-06	Durban, KwaZulu-Natal	Unknown	Anderson was swimming at back beach when he yelled for help. Two bathers came to his aid and brought him ashore. Anderson was nearly dead when he reached the beach. When a doctor arrived, he was dead. His right femoral artery was severed.
John Hendrick Adrian Chandler, 29	1901-07-30	False Bay, Western Cape	Great white	Chandler was a prisoner swimming at Windmill Beach when a shark grabbed him and dragged him beneath the water. He surfaced again. The shark bit him twice, but Chandler was able to fight off the shark and swam to shore. Other prisoners pulled him onto the rocks. He soon passed out and was taken to the prison hospital. He died 30 minutes after the attack.
William Strathorn, 30	1900-11-14	Cape Town, Western Cape	Unknown	Stratorn went for a swim but disappeared. A witness claims he saw a man shouting, but could not understand him. However, he understood the man needed help, so he sent out a boat, but by the time the boat was out, the victim had disappeared. Days later, a body washed ashore, its left leg missing and right leg gone below the knee. Many believe this to be the body Strathorn.
A Young Indian Boy	1897-07-21	Durban, KwaZulu-Natal	Unknown	This unidentified male was wading after fish that had escaped from the fishing nets. A shark appeared, grabbed the boy, and swam off. His body was never recovered.
Sombutize, 28	1895-04-29	Mzimvubu River, Eastern Cape	Unconfirmed (But probably Bull shark)	Sombutize was trying to cross the river when he yelled he was bitten by a shark. He managed to reach shore and was found by two women. The women took him to their house where he died the next morning.
A Swedish Whaler	1894-06-25	False Bay, Western Cape	Unknown (But probably a Great white)	This unknown man was swimming after a harpooned whale capsized his boat. The water turned red, he shrieked, and was pulled under the water. His body was not recovered.
A Young Zulu Boy	Circa 1890 circa	Cape Vidal, KwaZulu-Natal	Unknown	A boy went swimming with his friends when he yelled something bit his leg. The boys friends saw a shark swim by. When they pulled him to shore, they realized he had deep gashes to his leg. He died before any medical assistance could help him.
A Native South African Man	1888-02	Mzimvubu River, Eastern Cape	Unknown (But likely Bull shark)	This unidentified man was crossing the river mouth when he was dragged under by a shark. His upper body washed ashore later.
Zangile, 13	1887-01-12	Mzimvubu River, Eastern Cape	Unknown	Zangile was swimming with friends when he yelled he was bitten. While his friends were pulling him to shore, they saw a fin of a shark in the water. One of his friends ran to get help. He died the next day after treatment.
Dr. James Woolby	1886-01-01	Groot River, Western Cape	Unknown	Woobly was swimming with friends when they were swept by a current. All but Woolby were able to reach shore, but one of them tried to rescue him. But, when he was swimming for him, it appeared as if Woolby were trying to grab something. He disappeared. Remains of a human washed ashore later. He may have drowned before being consumed.
Mr. Meyer	1884-01-16	Port Elizabeth, Eastern Cape	Unknown	While swimming, Mr. Meyer disappeared. At first it was believed he drowned, but his shark-bitten body washed ashore a few days after the attack. A witness claimed he saw a shark attack around the same time that he disappeared.
A Male Sailor	1878-02-13	Albatross Rock, Western Cape	Unknown	This unknown man was part of the crew of a ship that sank after hitting Albatross Rock. Later, his shark-bitten body was found. He could have drowned before being consumed.
A Servant	1852-05-24	Durban Bay, KwaZulu-Natal	Unknown	This unknown person was a servant of Mr. Mussum. They were swimming from a capsized boat when the person was killed by a shark.
Sailors	1852-02-26	Gansbaai, Western Cape	Unknown	The ship Birkenhead sank after striking a rock. Many of the sailors who were left in the water were taken by sharks.

== Unknown ==
Name, age	Date	Location	Species	Details
a Scotsman	Prior to July 1913	Durban, KwaZulu-Natal	unknown	This young Scotsman was bathing in the water when he yelled and started struggling. Witnesses saw that a shark had grabbed his leg and was stripping its flesh. They pulled him from the water, and he died on the sand.
a young Indian boy	unknown	Durban, KwaZulu-Natal	unknown	A young Indian boy went swimming when he screamed, and people pulled him to shore. He had one leg missing. It is believed a shark was trapped into the area when and while a wall was being constructed in the water.
a mental patient	unknown	Murray Bay, Robben Island	unknown, probably great white	This man was seen swimming when the fin of a shark was seen nearing him. A boat was launched to help him, but he was gone by then and his body was never recovered.
a Zulu fisherman	Prior to July 1913, three days after attack on young Scotman	Durban, KwaZulu-Natal	unknown	A local fisherman was attacked by a shark and was nearly bitten in two. Police caught a shark with the clothes of the native in its stomach.
Sinsa	1967-01-03 - prior to	Keiskamma River, Eastern Cape	unknown	Sinsa was seen crossing the river with his raft when witnesses saw his hands slip off the raft. The fin of a shark appeared. Sinsa emerged and pulled himself onto the raft. People took a boat out, put him in the boat, and started to shore. While on the way back, they realized his leg had been bitten on the thigh. Once they reached shore, witnesses tried to stop the bleeding and call for a doctor, but he died soon after.
a Man	1921 - prior to	Durban Bay, KwaZulu-Natal	unknown	This man was a part of the crew swimming around their ship when he was bitten and devoured by sharks. There was probably more than one shark because he was consumed so fast.
a Male	1921 - prior to	Durban Bay, KwaZulu-Natal	unknown	This man was bathing with four other people in just 3' deep water when he was attacked by a shark, almost being bitten in half. He died before reaching the hospital.
