= List of shipwrecks in August 1840 =

The list of shipwrecks in August 1840 includes ships sunk, foundered, wrecked, grounded, or otherwise lost during August 1840.

== 1 August ==
List of shipwrecks: 1 August 1840
Ship	State	Description
Henry	United Kingdom	The ship was driven ashore near Torbay, Newfoundland, British North America. Her crew were rescued. She was on a voyage from Savannah, Georgia to Dalhousie, New Brunswick, British North America.

== 2 August ==
List of shipwrecks: 2 August 1840
Ship	State	Description
Waterloo	United Kingdom	The schooner ran aground on the Swanage Ledge and was damaged. She was on a voyage from Newcastle upon Tyne, Northumberland to Dartmouth, Devon. Waterloo was refloated and taken into Swanage, Dorset.

== 3 August ==
List of shipwrecks: 3 August 1840
Ship	State	Description
Rossini	Hamburg	The ship was wrecked on the Muares, in the Bahama Channel. All on board were rescued. She was on a voyage from Hamburg to Havana, Cuba. Rossini subsequently floated off. She was taken into Havana on 17 August.

== 4 August ==
List of shipwrecks: 4 August 1840
Ship	State	Description
Alexander Liddle	United Kingdom	The ship ran aground at Saint Petersburg, Russia and was damaged. She was on a voyage from Madeira to Saint Petersburg. she was refloated the next day.
Cora	United Kingdom	The ship was driven ashore on Cape Sable Island, Nova Scotia, British North America. She was on a voyage from Saint John, New Brunswick, British North America to Aberavon, Glamorgan. Cora floated off on 8 August and was subsequently taken into Isaac's Harbour, Nova Scotia, where she was condemned.

== 5 August ==
List of shipwrecks: 5 August 1840
Ship	State	Description
Gem	United Kingdom	The ship ran aground near Torbay, Newfoundland. She was on a voyage from Halifax, Nova Scotia to Quebec City, Lower Canada, British North America. Gem was later refloated and put into White Head Island, Nova Scotia for repairs.
George and Mary	United Kingdom	The ship was wrecked on a reef in the "Bay of Adamana". She was on a voyage from Calcutta, India to London.
Golden Grove	United Kingdom	The ship ran aground on the Herd Sand, in the North Sea off the coast of County Durham. She was subsequently refloated and taken into South Shields, where she was repaired and lengthened.
Good Intent	United Kingdom	The ship was wrecked on Long Island, New York, United States.
Rochdale	United Kingdom	The ship was abandoned in the Bristol Channel off Lundy Island, Devon. Her crew were rescued. She subsequently foundered.

== 6 August ==
List of shipwrecks: 6 August 1840
Ship	State	Description
Rhoda	United Kingdom	The ship was wrecked on Dog Island, Anguilla. Her crew were rescued. She was on a voyage from Saint Kitts to the Clyde.
Wardlaw	United Kingdom	The ship ran aground at Beaumaris, Anglesey. She was on a voyage from Bangor, Caernarfonshire to Belfast, County Antrim. Wardlaw was refloated on 10 August.

== 7 August ==
List of shipwrecks: 7 August 1840
Ship	State	Description
Lady Stirling	(United Kingdom of Great Britain and Ireland) Swan River Colony	The ship sprang a leak and was beached at Woodman Point, where she was wrecked. She was on a voyage from Fremantle to Leschenault.

== 8 August ==
List of shipwrecks: 8 August 1840
Ship	State	Description
Argo	Danzig	The ship departed from Sunderland, County Durham for Danzig. No further trace, presumed foundered with the loss of all hands.
Cygne	France	The ship was wrecked on Paarden Island, Cape Colony. She was on a voyage from Granville, Manche to Île Bourbon.
Guadeloupe	Spain	The ship was wrecked on the Buxey Sand, in the North Sea off the coast of Essex, United Kingdom. Her crew were rescued. She was on a voyage from Bremen to Cádiz.
Methven Castle	United Kingdom	The ship struck the Skerryraidish Rock and sank. She was on a voyage from Stettin to Liverpool, Lancashire.
Mountaineer	United Kingdom	The ship ran aground on the Black Deeps. She was on a voyage from Hamburg to Newfoundland, British North America. Mountaineer was refloated and taken into Wivenhoe, Essex.

== 9 August ==
List of shipwrecks: 9 August 1840
Ship	State	Description
Florence	United States	The brig was wrecked near Cape Race, Newfoundland, British North America with the loss of 50 of the 87 people on board. She was on a voyage from Rotterdam, South Holland, Netherlands to New York.
Hoffnung	Hamburg	The ship was sighted off Helsingør, Denmark whilst on a voyage from Riga, Russia to Antwerp, Belgium. No further trace, presumed foundered with the loss of all hands.
Methven Castle	United Kingdom	The ship struck a sunken rock off the Isle of Skye, Outer Hebrides and was wrecked. She was on a voyage from Stettin to Liverpool, Lancashire.

== 11 August ==
List of shipwrecks: 11 August 1840
Ship	State	Description
Dundee	United Kingdom	The ship was driven ashore on Saltholm, Denmark. She was on a voyage from Saint Petersburg, Russia to Dundee, Forfarshire. Dundee was refloated and taken into Helsingør, subsequently sailing to Copenhagen, where she arrived on 15 August.
Palmer	United Kingdom	The ship was driven ashore and wrecked at Green Point, Cape Colony. She was on a voyage from London to Cape Town.
Victory	United Kingdom	The ship ran aground on the Nore. She was on a voyage from Bangor to London. Victory was refloated and resumed her voyage.

== 12 August ==
List of shipwrecks: 12 August 1840
Ship	State	Description
Derwent	United Kingdom	The ship ran aground on the Heard Sand, in the Irish Sea off the coast of Cumberland and was severely damaged.
Effort	United Kingdom	The ship was wrecked on a reef south east of Cape Bonavista, Newfoundland, British North America. Her crew were rescued. She was on a voyage from Trinidad de Cuba, Cuba to Halifax, Nova Scotia, British North America.
Hoffnung	Hamburg	The ship was driven ashore at the Cordouan Lighthouse, Gironde, France. She was refloated and towed into Royan, Charente-Maritime.

== 13 August ==
List of shipwrecks: 13 August 1840
Ship	State	Description
Charles Grant	United Kingdom	The East Indiaman ran aground off the Gull Lightship ( Trinity House). She was on a voyage from London to Bombay, India. She was refloated on 14 August.
Diligence	United Kingdom	The smack was driven onto rocks at Mullion Head, Cornwall and sank with the loss of one of her four crew. Survivors were rescued by the schooner Lucy (United Kingdom). Diligence was on a voyage from Caernarfon to Hull, Yorkshire.

== 14 August ==
List of shipwrecks: 14 August 1840
Ship	State	Description
British Tar	United Kingdom	The brig ran aground on the Arklow Bank, in the Irish Sea off the coast of County Wicklow and subsequently became a wreck. Her crew were rescued. She was on a voyage from Saint John, New Brunswick, British North America to Liverpool, Lancashire.British Tar floated off on 17 August.
Indian Oak	United Kingdom	The transport ship was wrecked about 10 miles north of Napakiang (Naha) at Great Loochow Island (Okinawa). The Okinawans built a junk for the crew and passengers from Indian Oak that was given the name Loochoo. HMS Cruizer and Nimrod arrived on 16 September. Nimrod and Loochoo, which was carrying the people from Indian Oak, sailed on 28 September and arrived at Chusan on 5 October.
Jonge Florentz	Flag unknown	The ship was driven ashore at Hirstholm, Denmark. She was on a voyage from Rouen, Seine-Inférieure, France to a Baltic port.
Najaden	Prussia	The brig was driven ashore a league (3 nautical miles (5.6 km)) west of Frederikshavn, Denmark with the loss of six of her crew. She was on a voyage from Hull, Yorkshire, United Kingdom to Kiel.

== 15 August ==
List of shipwrecks: 15 August 1840
Ship	State	Description
Albion	United Kingdom	The ship was wrecked on the Vogel Sand, in the North Sea. Her crew were rescued.
Argus	United Kingdom	The ship foundered in the North Sea 37 nautical miles (69 km) west of Heligoland. Her crew were rescued. She was on a voyage from Hamburg to London.
Harriet	United Kingdom	The ship ran aground on the Hook Sand, in the Bristol Channel and was damaged. She was on a voyage from Quebec City, Lower Canada, British North America to Gloucester. Harriet was refloated.
Johanna	Stettin	The ship foundered in the North Sea. Her crew were rescued.
John and Mary	United Kingdom	The ship sank on the Sand Hole, in the North Sea with the loss of four of her crew. She was refloated on 21 August and taken into Grimsby, Lincolnshire.
Mars	Hamburg	The ship was wrecked on the Vogelsand with the loss of all hands. She was on a voyage from Hamburg to Newfoundland, British North America.
Nile	United Kingdom	The ship ran aground and sank at Carlisle, Cumberland. She was on a voyage from Bathurst to Carlisle. Nile was later refloated.
Red Rover	United Kingdom	The ship was wrecked on the Vogel Sand. Her crew were rescued. She was on a voyage from Hamburg to Hull, Yorkshire.
Vesta	France	The ship was abandoned in the North Sea 26 nautical miles (48 km) west south west of Lindesnes, Norway. She was on a voyage from Nantes, Loire Atlantique to a Baltic port.

== 16 August ==
List of shipwrecks: 16 August 1840
Ship	State	Description
Mary	United Kingdom	The ship was wrecked on the Gore Sands, in the Bristol Channel with the loss of all five people on board. She was on a voyage from Newport, Monmouthshire to Bridgwater, Somerset.
Regina	United Kingdom	The ship was driven ashore at "Reimersbude". She was on a voyage from London to Königsberg, Prussia. Regina was refloated on 1 September and resumed her voyage.
Rowena	United Kingdom	The ship ran aground at Barmouth, Merionethshire. She was on a voyage from Quebec City, Lower Canada, British North America to Barmouth.
Traveller	United Kingdom	The ship foundered in the Irish Sea. Her three crew were rescued by the pilot boat № 1 (United Kingdom). Traveller was on a voyage from Wicklow to Liverpool, Lancashire.

== 17 August ==
List of shipwrecks: 17 August 1840
Ship	State	Description
Ceres	United Kingdom	The ship was wrecked off Aldeburgh, Suffolk. Her crew were rescued. She was on a voyage from London to Newcastle upon Tyne, Northumberland.
Elizabeth	United Kingdom	The ship was driven ashore at St. Bees Head, Cumberland. She was on a voyage from Newry, County Antrim to Whitehaven, Cumberland.
Enez Batz	France	The brig was driven ashore and sank at Margate, Kent, United Kingdom. Her crew were rescued by Jasper (United Kingdom). Enez Batz was on a voyage from Sunderland, County Durham, United Kingdom to Morlaix, Finistère.
Hope	United Kingdom	The ship was wrecked on the Gunfleet Sand, in the North Sea off the coast of Essex. Her seven crew were rescued. She was on a voyage from Sunderland, County Durham to Rochester, Kent.
Lady of the Lake	United Kingdom	The schooner was driven ashore at Hythe, Kent.
Lily	United Kingdom	The brig foundered in the English Channel off Beachy Head, Sussex. Her crew were rescued by Ranger (United Kingdom). Lily was on a voyage from Guernsey, Channel Islands to London.
Louisa	United Kingdom	The ship ran aground at Flushing, Cornwall. She was refloated.
Minerva	United Kingdom	The ship was driven ashore and wrecked near Southport, Lancashire. Her crew were rescued. She was on a voyage from Memel, Prussia to Fleetwood-on-Wyre, Lancashire.
Royal Oak	United Kingdom	The collier was driven ashore and wrecked at Deal, Kent. Her crew were rescued.
Shepherd	United Kingdom	The collier was driven ashore and wrecked at Deal. Her crew were rescued.
Star	United Kingdom	The ship was driven ashore at Port Talbot, Glamorgan. She was refloated.
Union	United Kingdom	The collier was driven ashore and wrecked at Deal. Her crew were rescued.

== 18 August ==
List of shipwrecks: 18 August 1840
Ship	State	Description
Amphitrite	United Kingdom	The ship was driven ashore at Felixtowe, Suffolk. She was on a voyage from Newcastle upon Tyne, Northumberland to Marseille, Bouches-du-Rhône, France.
Elizabeth	United Kingdom	The ship was driven ashore near St Bees Head, Cumberland. She was on a voyage from Newry, County Antrim to Whitehaven, Cumberland. Elizabeth had been refloated by 23 August and taken into Whitehaven.
Hope	United Kingdom	The ship was driven ashore at Coatham, Northumberland.
Jardins	Belgium	The ship was driven onto the Spyker Plaat Bank, in the North Sea off the coast of Zeeland, Netherlands. She was on a voyage from New York, United States to Antwerp. Jardins was later refloated and put into Vlissingen, Zeeland.

== 19 August ==
List of shipwrecks: 19 August 1840
Ship	State	Description
Cordelia	Stettin	The ship sank off Flekkerøy, Norway with the loss of two lives. She was on a voyage from Stettin to London, United Kingdom.
Franconia	United Kingdom	The ship was struck by lightning and set on fire whilst on a voyage from New Orleans, Louisiana, United States to Liverpool, Lancashire. She put into Havana, Cuba where she was scuttled.
Hosten	Sweden	The ship was driven ashore on "Farde". She was on a voyage from Sundsvall to La Rochelle, Charente-Maritime, France. She was later refloated and taken into "Capelshaven" for repairs.

== 20 August ==
List of shipwrecks: 20 August 1840
Ship	State	Description
Elizabeth	Hamburg	The brig was in collision with a barque off Folkestone, Kent, United Kingdom. She was taken in tow by the sloop Mars (France) and beached at Cherbourg, Seine-Inférieure. Elizabeth was on a voyage from Rio de Janeiro, Brazil to Altona.
San Jacinto	Texas Navy	The 5-gun schooner as wrecked at Cayo Arcas, Mexico.

== 21 August ==
List of shipwrecks: 21 August 1840
Ship	State	Description
Crescent	United Kingdom	The ship was wrecked on Greg's Shoal, off "Caramatta Island". Her crew were rescued. She was on a voyage from Singapore to London.

== 22 August ==
List of shipwrecks: 22 August 1840
Ship	State	Description
Fancy	United Kingdom	The ship struck a rock and foundered in the English Channel north of Guernsey, Channel Islands. Her crew were rescued. She was on a voyage from Guernsey to Brixham, Devon.

== 23 August ==
List of shipwrecks: 23 August 1840
Ship	State	Description
Gretry	Belgium	The brig ran aground on the Goodwin Sands, Kent, United Kingdom and capsized. Her crew were rescued. She was on a voyage from Antwerp to Liverpool, Lancashire, United Kingdom. Gretry was subsequently beached at North Foreland, Kent.

== 24 August ==
List of shipwrecks: 24 August 1840
Ship	State	Description
Diana	United Kingdom	The ship was driven ashore near Hartley, Northumberland. She was on a voyage from Riga, Russia to South Shields, County Durham. Diana was refloated on 27 August and towed into South Shields.
King Fisher	United Kingdom	The sloop caught fire and was beached at Lybster, Caithness.
Mangalore	United Kingdom	The ship ran aground on a shoal off Belitung, Netherlands East Indies. She was refloated but consequently sank. Her crew were rescued. She was on a voyage from China to Batavia, Netherlands East Indies and London.
St. Marc	France	The lugger was wrecked on the Parton Stell Rocks, in the North Sea off the coast of Northumberland, United Kingdom. Her six crew were rescued. She was on a voyage from North Sunderland, County Durhamto Boulogne, Pas-de-Calais.
Unity	United Kingdom	The smack struck the Wheel Rock, in the River Severn and capsized.

== 25 August ==
List of shipwrecks: 25 August 1840
Ship	State	Description
Amazon	United Kingdom	The ship was driven ashore on the Stone Banks, off the mouth of the Humber. She was on a voyage from Quebec City, Lower Canada, British North America to Hull, Yorkshire. Amazon was refloated the next day and put into Hull in a damaged condition.
Thomas Rickinson	United Kingdom	The ship was driven ashore on "Amack Isle". She was on a voyage from Saint Petersburg, Russia to Hull, Yorkshire. She was refloated on 29 August and resumed her voyage.

== 26 August ==
List of shipwrecks: 27 August 1840
Ship	State	Description
Active	United Kingdom	The ship was driven ashore at Deal, Kent.

== 27 August ==
List of shipwrecks: 26 August 1840
Ship	State	Description
Caroline	(United Kingdom of Great Britain and Ireland) New South Wales	The brig was driven ashore on Rocky Point.

== 29 August ==
List of shipwrecks: 29 August 1840
Ship	State	Description
Echo	(United Kingdom of Great Britain and Ireland) New South Wales	The schooner was wrecked between Cape Pillar and Cape Raoul with the loss of all hands, at least three lives. She was on a voyage from Hobart, Van Diemen's Land to Sydney.
Frances	(United Kingdom of Great Britain and Ireland) South Australia	The cutter was wrecked on Neptune Island. Her crew survived.

== 30 August ==
List of shipwrecks: 30 August 1840
Ship	State	Description
St. Patrick	United Kingdom	The ship sank at the mouth of the River Dee. She was on a voyage from Flint to Dundalk, County Louth.

== 31 August ==
List of shipwrecks: 31 August 1840
Ship	State	Description
Argo	Russia	The ship ran aground off Skagen, Denmark. She was on a voyage from Matanzas, Cuba to Saint Petersburg. Argo was refloated and put into Helsingør, Denmark, where she arrived on 5 September.
Neva	Russia	The ship ran aground off Skagen. She was later refloated and resumed her voyage.

== Unknown date ==
List of shipwrecks: Unknown date in August 1840
Ship	State	Description
Acquilla	(United Kingdom of Great Britain and Ireland) New Zealand	The cutter was driven ashore at the Bay of Islands, New Zealand, and was totally wrecked.
Brenda	United Kingdom	The ship was wrecked off Machias, Maine before 15 August. She was on a voyage from Savannah, Georgia to Saint John, New Brunswick, British North America.
Buffalo	(United Kingdom of Great Britain and Ireland) New Zealand	The government store ship was driven ashore at Mercury Bay, New Zealand during a fierce gale. There were no deaths, and the ship's cargo was salvaged. Mercury Bay's Buffalo beach is named in honour of the event.
Cassandra	United Kingdom	The ship was driven ashore at Büyükdere, Ottoman Empire. She was on a voyage from Odesa to Falmouth, Cornwall or Cork. Cassandra was refloated on 25 August with assistance from HMS Talbot (Royal Navy).
Clarence	United Kingdom	The ship was wrecked on Long Island, New York, United States. She was on a voyage from Saint John, New Brunswick to Demerara, British Honduras.
City of Durham	United Kingdom	The ship was driven ashore at Steffand Point, Ottoman Empire. She was on a voyage from Alexandria, Egypt to Odesa. City of Durham was refloated on 22 August and resumed her voyage.
Cronstadt	United States	The ship ran aground on the Falsterbo Reef. She was on a voyage from Saint Petersburg, Russia to Boston, Massachusetts. Cronstadt was refloated and taken into Copenhagen, Denmark, where she arrived on 13 August.
Elizabeth	Belgium	The ship sank off Dover, Kent, United Kingdom. She was on a voyage from Rio de Janeiro, Brazil to Antwerp. Elizabeth was refloated on 27 August and taken into Dover.
Heron	United Kingdom	The ship ran aground on the Knock Sand, in The Wash. She was on a voyage from Saint Petersburg to Boston, Lincolnshire. Heron was refloated on 15 August.'
New Grove	United Kingdom	The ship was wrecked on the Morant Cays before 7 August with the loss of two lives. She was on a voyage from Jamaica to London.
Suviah	United States	The ship ran aground on Prickett's Reef. She was on a voyage from Savannah to Liverpool, Lancashire, United Kingdom. Suviah was refloated and taken into Key West, Florida Territory, where she arrived on 31 August.
Union	United Kingdom	The ship was driven ashore near "Wremertief". She was on a voyage from Bremen to Leith, Lothian. Union was later refloated.
