= Neptune Islands Conservation Park =

Protected area in South Australia

- IUCN category Ia (strict nature reserve)
- Location within South Australia
- Location: South Australia
- Nearest city: Port Lincoln
- Coordinates: 35°16′51″S 136°05′38″E
- Area: 145.7 km^{2} (56.3 sq mi)
- Established: 16 March 1967
- Governing body: Department for Environment and Water

Neptune Islands Conservation Park is a protected area occupying most of the Neptune Islands in South Australia about 55 km (34 mi) south-south east of Port Lincoln. It was established in 1967 principally to protect a New Zealand fur seal breeding colony. The conservation park was subsequently expanded to include the adjoining waters in order to control and manage berleying activities used to attract great white sharks. As of 2002, the conservation park is the only place in Australia where shark cage diving to view great white sharks is legally permitted.

== Description ==
The conservation park includes all the islands within the group with the exception of all or part of the southernmost island (known as Lighthouse Island) in the South Neptune Islands where land has been reserved for ongoing use by a lighthouse and the waters within 2 nautical miles (4 km) of the mean low water mark of both groups of islands. The conservation park is classified as an IUCN Category Ia protected area.

== History ==
Part of the island group was proclaimed as a fauna conservation reserve under the Crown Lands Act 1929-1966 on 16 March 1967 mainly to conserve the New Zealand fur seal breeding colony on the southern island of the North Neptune Islands which is reported as being one of the largest in Australia. Other features that contributed to the declaration include the small breeding population of Australian sea lions on the North Neptune Islands, Australian sea lion haul out areas on the South Neptune Islands and the breeding/nesting populations of Cape Barren goose, white-bellied sea eagle, osprey and peregrine falcon.

The conservation park was subsequently extended in 1997 to include the waters within 2 nautical miles (4 km) of the shoreline of both the North and South Neptune Islands via a declaration under the National Parks and Wildlife Act 1972 to regulate and manage great white shark berleying activities around both groups of islands.

1n 1990, most of Lighthouse Island was reportedly added to the conservation park after the conversion of the lighthouse to automatic operation with the exception of some land around the lighthouse and an associated helicopter landing site.

On 29 November 2012, the waters within 2 nautical miles (4 km) of the coastline of both the North and South Neptune Islands at median high water also became part of a protected area known as the Neptune Islands Group (Ron and Valerie Taylor) Marine Park. The marine park entity provides a level of regulation additional to that of the conservation park in respect to the use of the waters adjoining both groups of islands.

== Visitor services ==
Since 2002, the conservation park is the only venue in Australia where the use of shark cage diving to view great white sharks is legally permitted. Access for shark cage diving is via three operators licensed by the Department of Environment, Water and Natural Resources.

== Gallery ==
Fauna intended to be protected by the declaration of the conservation park in 1967:

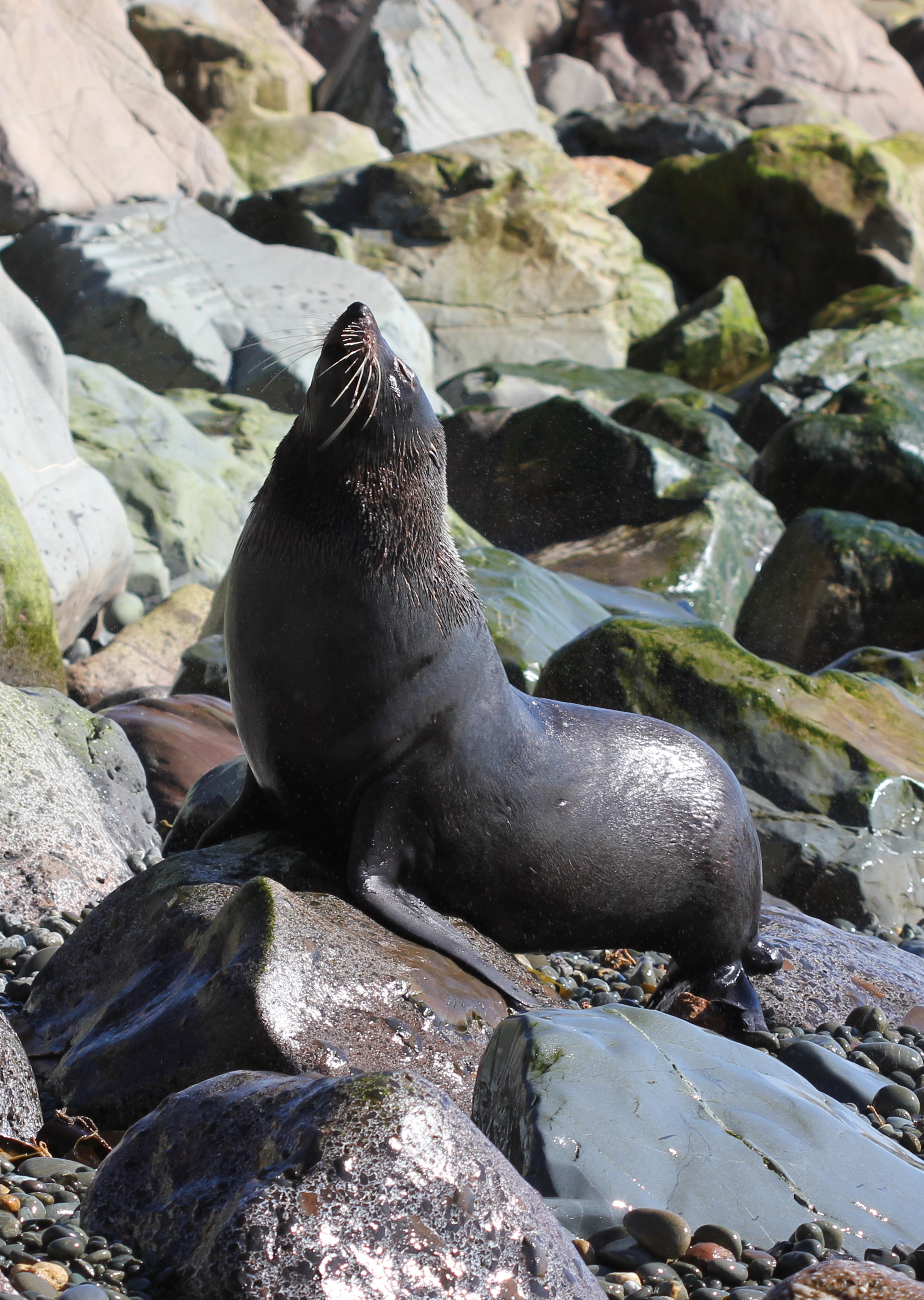
New Zealand fur seal

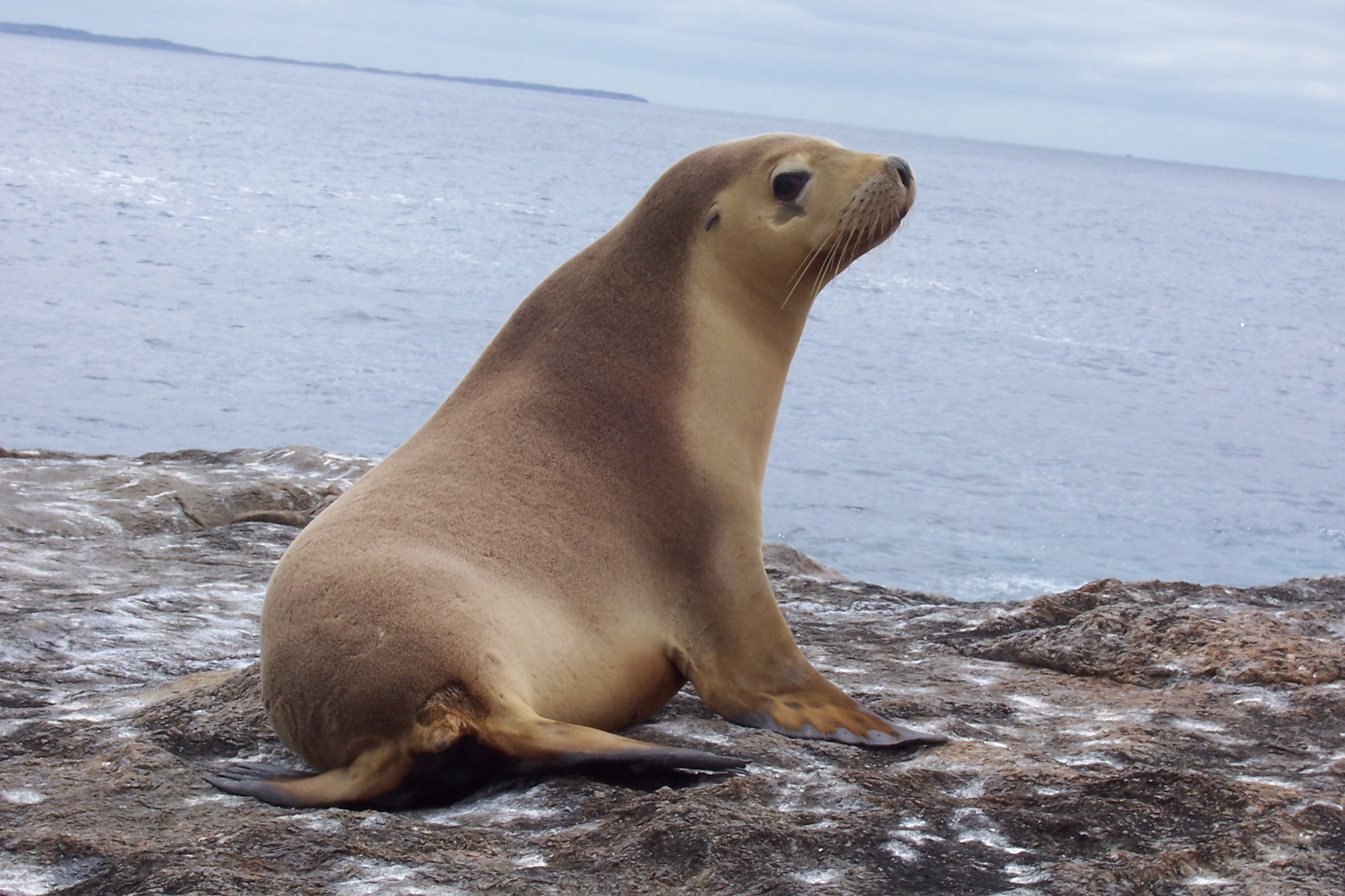
Australian sea lion

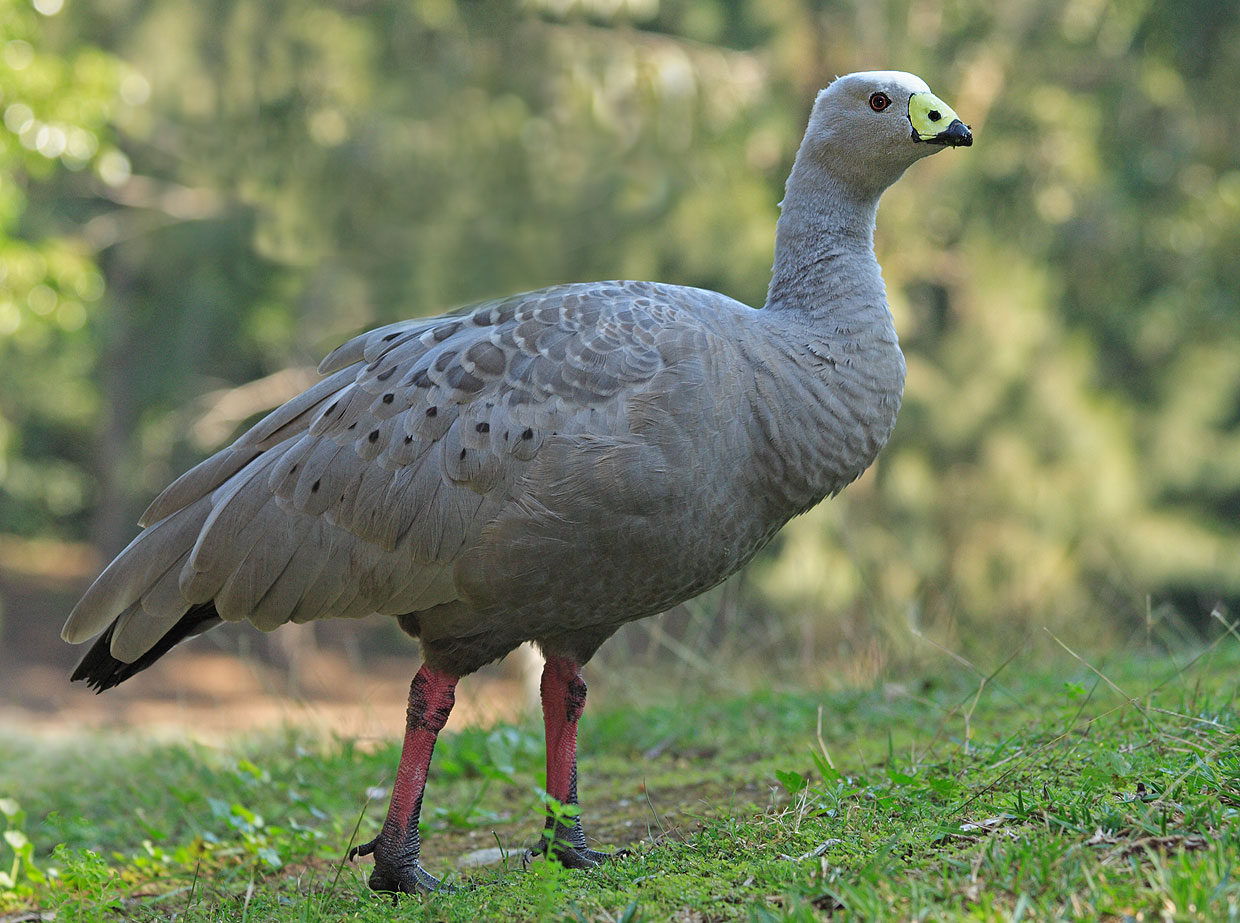
Cape Barren goose

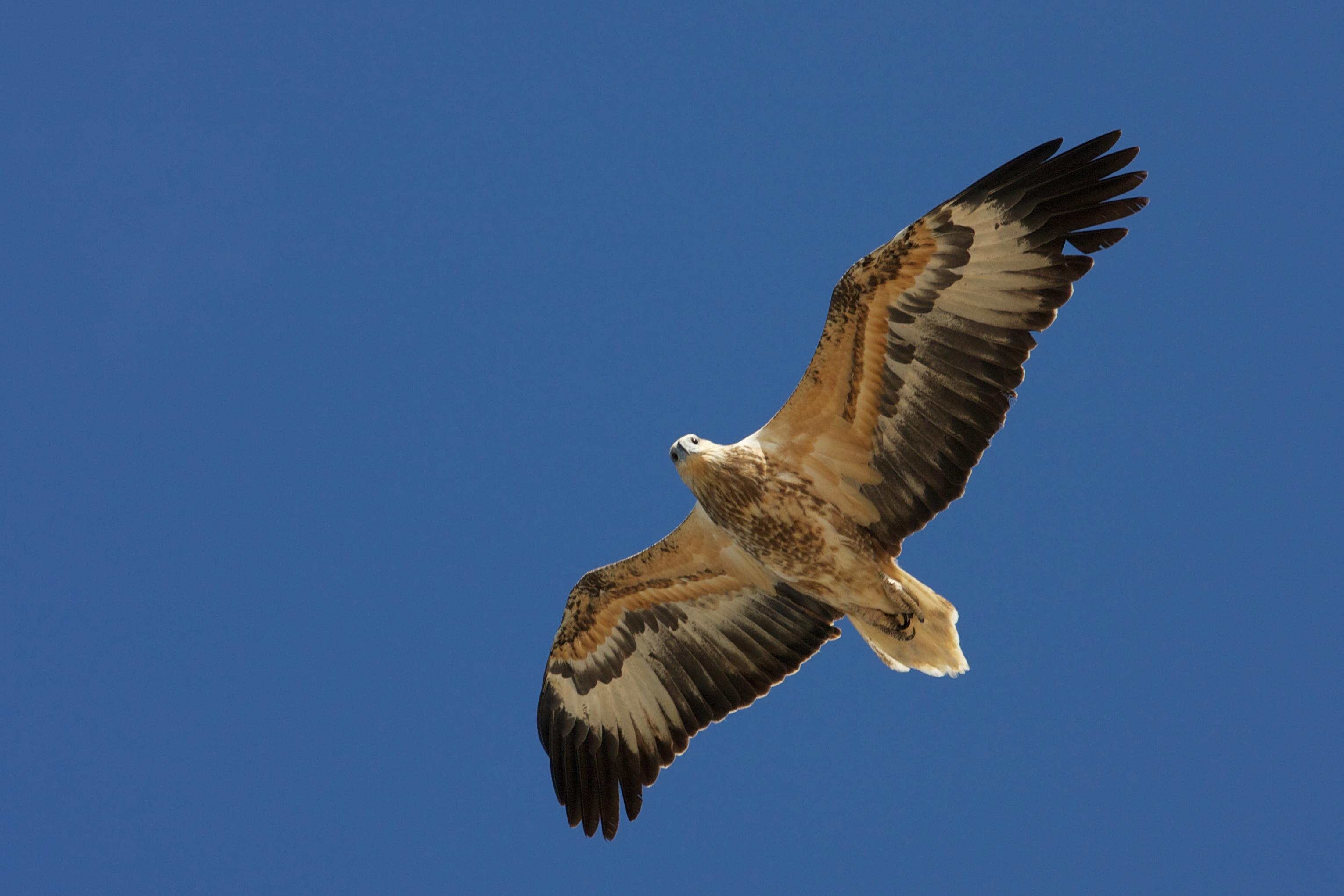
White-bellied sea eagle

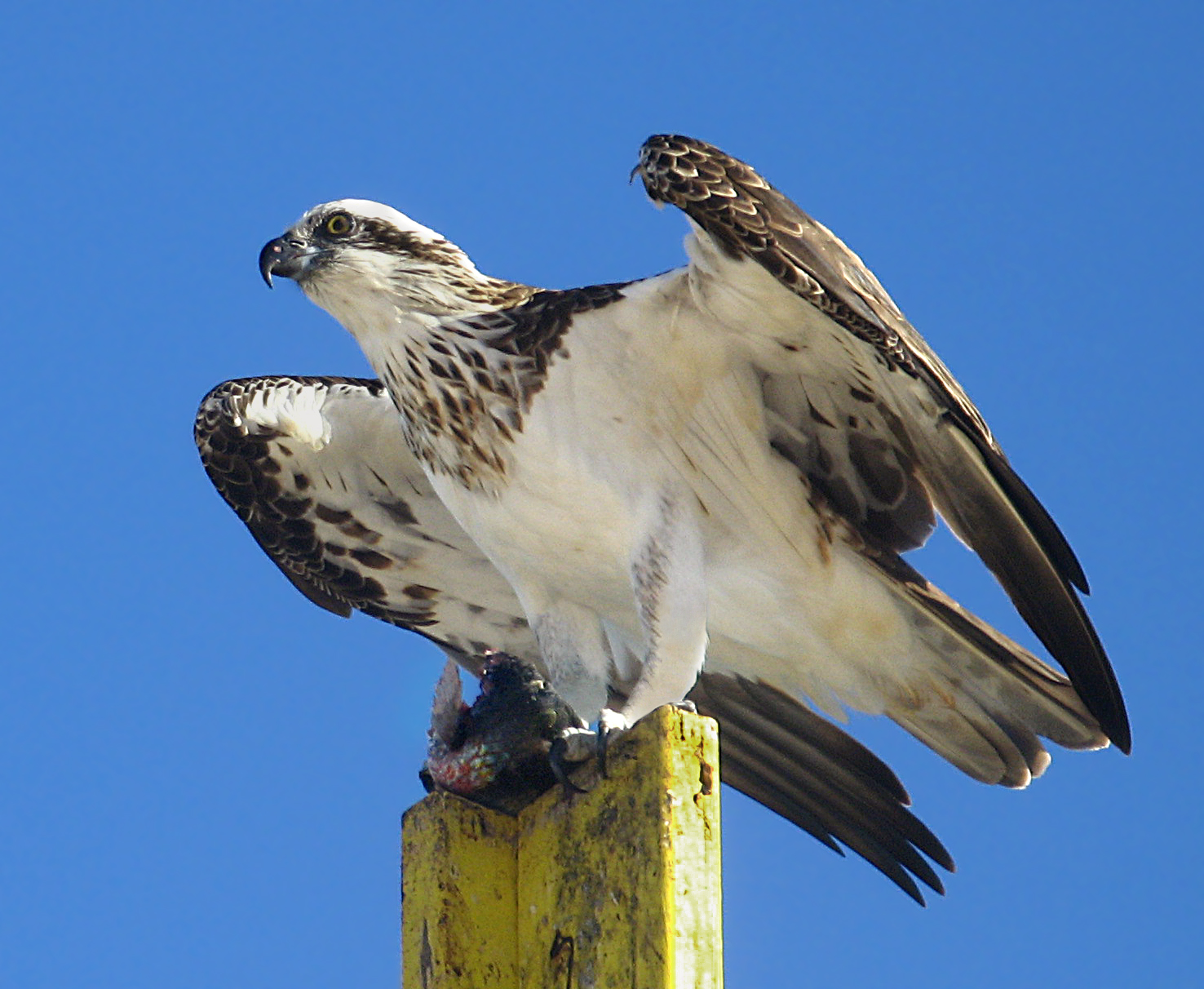
Osprey

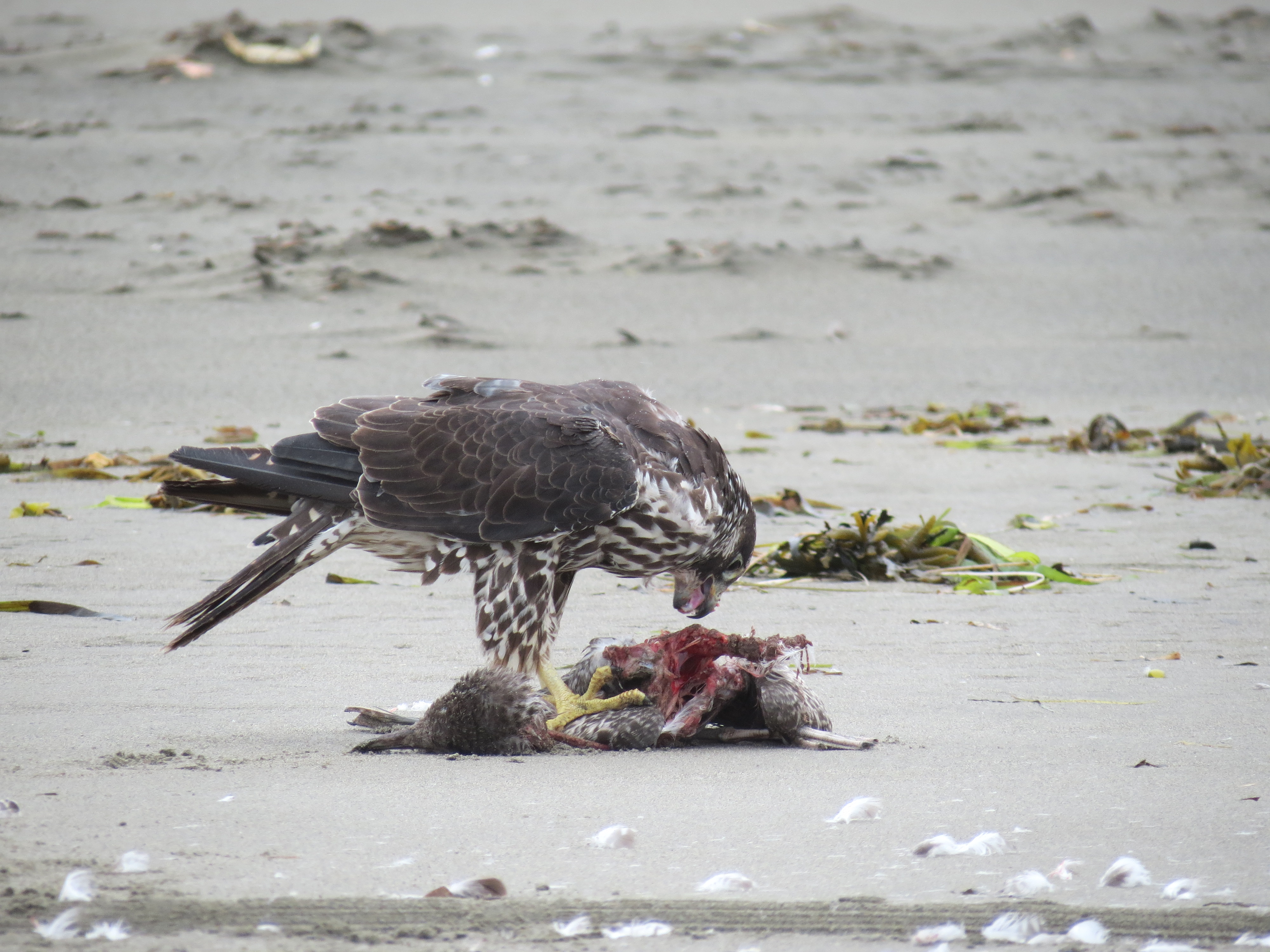
Peregrine falcon
