= Non-extractive economic value =

The non-extractive economic value of land is its monetary value the land creates without extracting resources or artificially developing it.

The economic value usually comes in the form of ecotourism: it is estimated that hundreds of billions of dollars are generated through visitation to protected areas, although little profit is reinvested in the preservation of said areas.

== Examples ==
=== Marine tourism ===
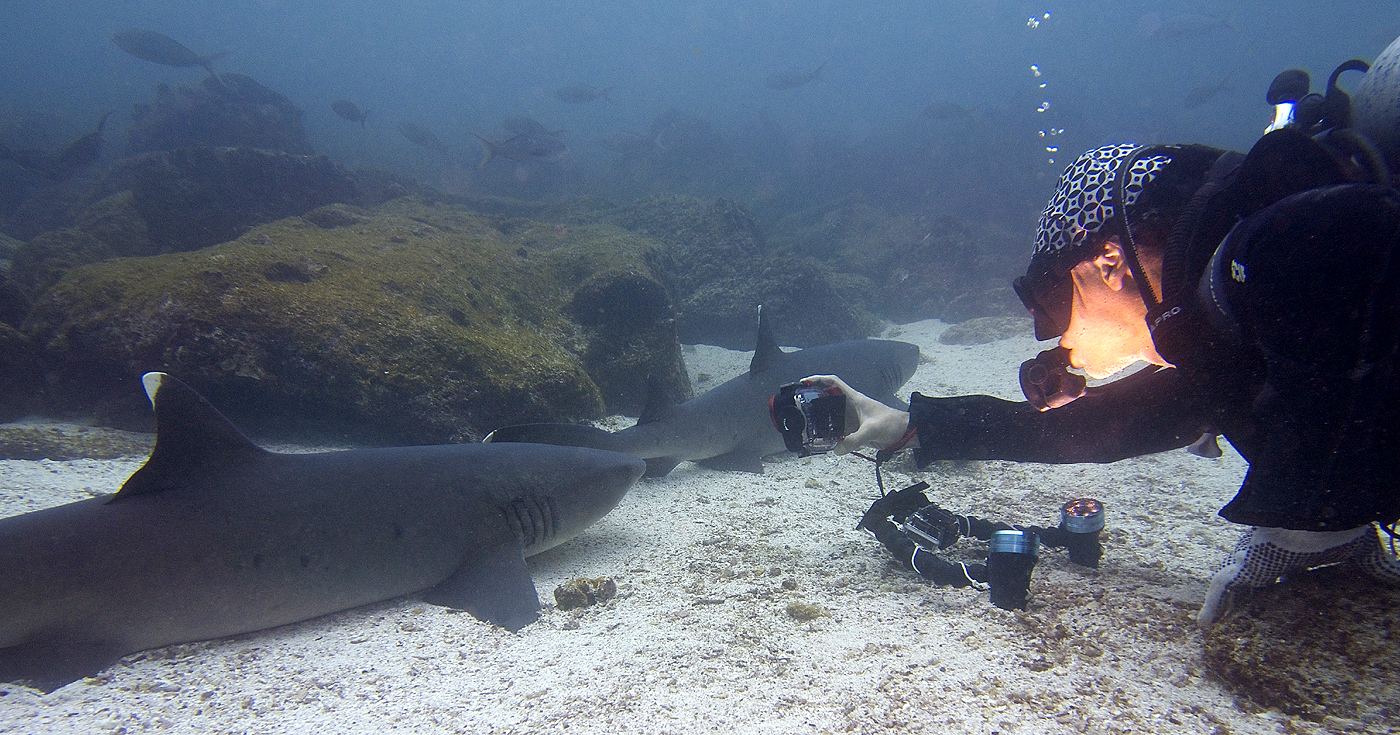
A diver photographing sharks, another example of non-extractive economic value

In 2001, Murray Rudd studied the economic impact of spiny lobsters – or lack thereof – on scuba diving. Rudd concludes that "there is justification for placing some positive non-extractive economic value on spiny lobsters", as scuba divers were inclined to pay more for marine tourism if given the guarantee that such lobsters would be present. Because of this, Rudd defends the economic viability of marine protected areas, especially on the Turks and Caicos Islands.

In this situation, the sheer presence of spiny lobsters has economic value, without the need for any human extraction or artificial development. A similar case can be perceived, for example, with the Great Barrier Reef: profit can be made from it simply existing, and as such, there is intrinsic, long-lasting economic value in preserving the reef from dangers such as coral bleaching.

=== Water ===
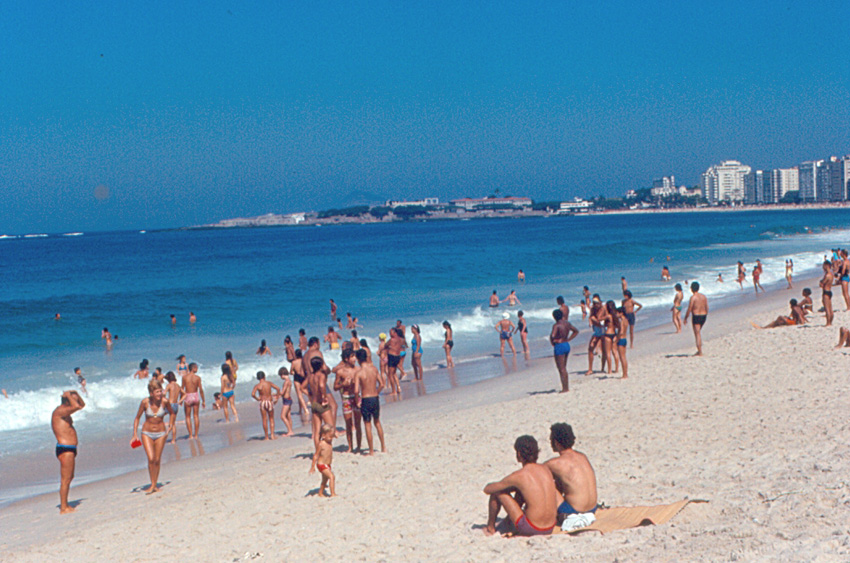
Beachgoers on Copacabana Beach in 1971

Water can also have non-extractive economic value. In their 2002 book, Steven Renzetti considers more indirect impacts of the presence of natural water. For example, Renzetti states that house prices are usually higher near streams or lakes – that is to say, properties near such bodies of water are considered more valuable.

Renzetti also mentions the economic value of recreational uses for water, such as recreational fishing and visits to beaches and lakes.

Further, Renzetti also considers a broader definition for non-extractive economic value, including hydropower in their list of such uses for water. Although it is definitely non-extractive and sustainable, it does require artificial development, and can have negative environmental impacts – albeit lower than those of comparable fossil fuel energy sources.

== See also ==
- Ecotourism

== Bibliography ==
- Rudd, Murray A. (September 2001). "The non-extractive economic value of spiny lobster, Panulirus argus, in the Turks and Caicos Islands". Environmental Conservation. 28 (3). Cambridge University Press: 226–234. doi:10.1017/S0376892901000236. JSTOR 44519903. S2CID 43880889.
- Renzetti, Steven (2002). "Value of Water in Non-Extractive Uses". The Economics of Water Demands. Natural Resource Management and Policy. Vol. 22. Boston: Springer Science+Business Media. pp. 113–130. doi:10.1007/978-1-4615-0865-6_9. ISBN 978-1-4615-0865-6.
