= South Neptune Island Lighthouse =

South Neptune Island Lighthouse (current)
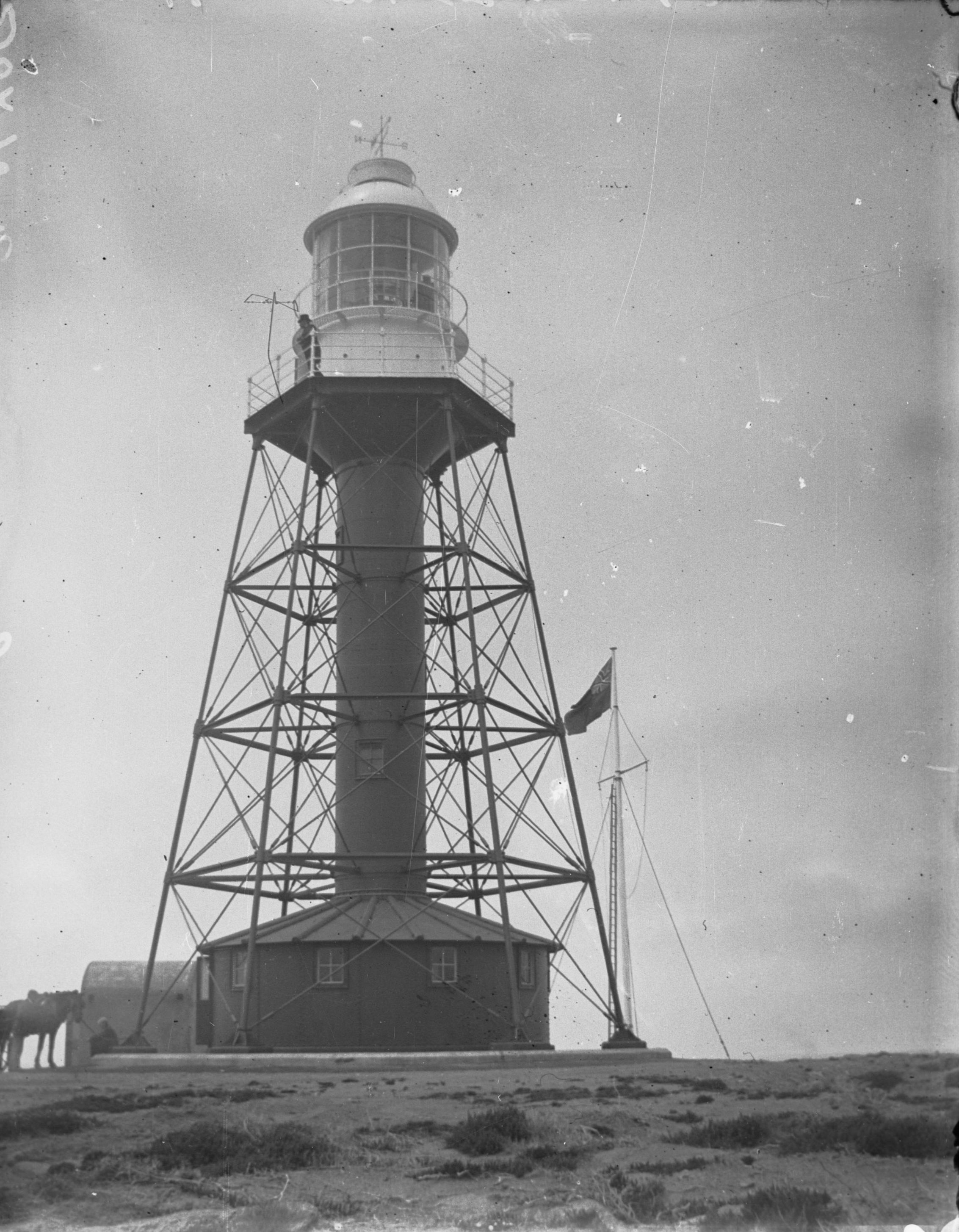
- South Neptune Island Lighthouse, 1902
- Location: Neptune Islands; South Australia; Australia
- Coordinates: 35°20′15.1″S 136°07′02.6″E

Tower
- Constructed: 1985
- Construction: brick tower
- Automated: 1990
- Height: 8 metres (26 ft)
- Shape: cylindrical tower with balcony and lantern removed in 1990
- Markings: unpainted tower, white lantern and balcony
- Power source: solar power
- Operator: Australian Maritime Safety Authority
- Heritage: state heritage place (except lighthouse tower) since 15 December 1994

Light
- Focal height: 43 metres (141 ft)
- Intensity: 24,000 cd
- Range: 26 kilometres (16.2 mi)
- Characteristic: Fl( 3) W 20s.

South Neptune Island Lighthouse is a lighthouse on Lighthouse Island of the South Neptune Islands (within the Neptune Islands archipelago), near the entrance to Spencer Gulf in South Australia.

== History ==
It was first lit on 1 November 1901. During the 1980s, a new tower was built to replace the original tower which was relocated to Port Adelaide to become part of the collection of the South Australian Maritime Museum. The lighthouse was converted to automatic operation in the early 1990s.

The remains of the first lighthouse, along with the attached keepers' cottages, store, outbuildings, island reserve, stone fences, stone rainwater tanks, and grave sites have been listed on the South Australian Heritage Register since 15 December 1994. The site's significance is reported as follows:

This relatively intact lighthouse complex is significant for its association with South Australia's maritime history and the State's continuing dependence on shipping for transport of commodities in the early 20th century. The construction of the keepers' cottages as an attached row, rather than separate buildings, was not common in South Australia, and these remain as the only surviving example of such construction in the State. The lighthouse has since been returned to Port Adelaide (see registered place 10313), but the remaining buildings illustrate the isolation and self-sufficient lifestyle of one of the State's more isolated lightstations. (HSA 2/2000)

== See also ==
- List of lighthouses in Australia
