= Frances (1839) =

Australian cutter built 1839

History
- Name: Frances
- Owner: Mr. Thompson, Kangaroo Island
- Port of registry: Port Adelaide
- Builder: William Paterson, Encounter Bay
- Completed: 1839
- Fate: Wrecked, Neptune Islands, SA 1840
- Notes: Wooden Hull

General characteristics
- Class & type: Cutter
- Tonnage: 7 tons
- Length: 24 ft 0 in (7.32 m)
- Beam: 8 ft 0 in (2.44 m)
- Depth: 4 ft 6 in (1.37 m)
- Crew: 5

Frances was a cutter built in 1839 at Encounter Bay, South Australia. It was wrecked on South Neptune Island on 29 August 1840. It was reported that the crew survived the wrecking event, came ashore and survived on a diet of penguin for 50 days before sending 2 people in a dinghy to Port Lincoln to seek help. Those remaining at South Neptune Island were subsequently rescued. While the wreck site is protected by the Commonwealth Historic Shipwrecks Act 1976 and its location is recorded as being at 35°33′00″S 136°12′00″E, as of 2004 it had not been found.

== See also ==
- List of shipwrecks of Australia
