= Port Adelaide Lighthouse =

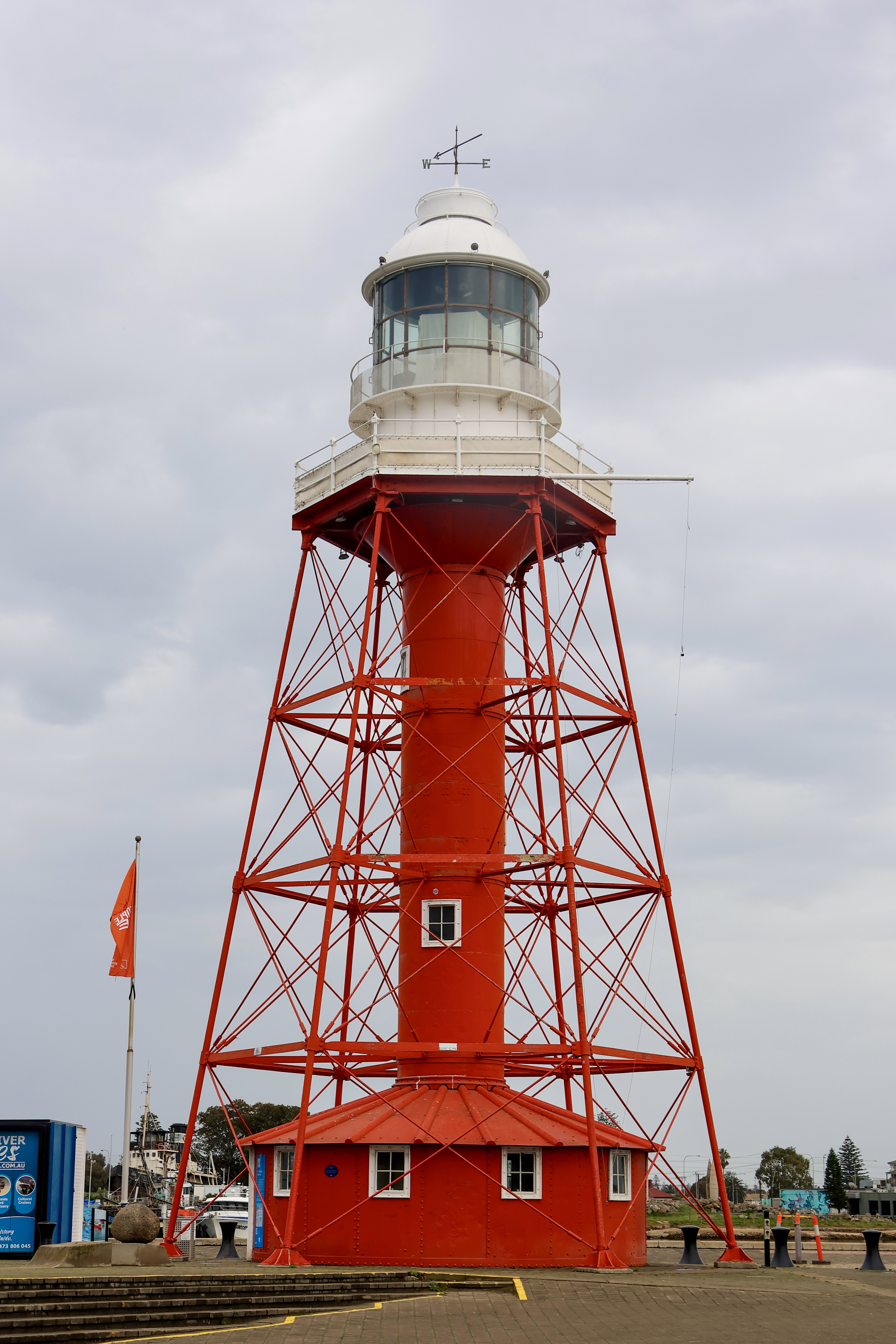
- Port Adelaide Lighthouse in 2026
- Location: Port Adelaide; South Australia
- Coordinates: 34.842475°S 138.504208°E

Tower
- Constructed: 1869
- Foundation: Platform on wooden piles
- Construction: Cast iron skeletal tower
- Height: 25 metres (82 ft)
- Shape: Hexagonal tower with balcony, lantern, central cylinder from keeper's house
- Markings: Red tower and keeper's house, white balcony and lantern
- Operator: South Australian Maritime Museum
- Heritage: State heritage place since 24 July 1980

Light
- Deactivated: 1985
- Lens: 2nd order Chance Brothers Fresnel lens

Port Adelaide Lighthouse is a lighthouse located on the North Parade of Port Adelaide. It was first lit in 1869 at the entrance to the Port River near Outer Harbor. In 1901, it was moved to the Neptune Islands and relocated to the current location in 1986. It is listed on the South Australian Heritage Register since 1980. It is occasionally lit on weekends and for special events.

== Entry ==
=== Opening times ===
Please visit the SA Maritime Museum website for further information about lighthouse tours.

The SA Maritime Museum is open from 10am - 5pm every day. Closed Christmas Day.

=== Cost ===
Currently the lighthouse is only open as part of a tour run by the SA Maritime Museum, with the currently listed prices being:

Children: $9.00 (children under 5 free)
Concession: $17.00
Adult: $22.50
Family: $55.00 (two adults, up to three children)
Family concession: $43.50 (two adults, up to three children)

== Gallery ==
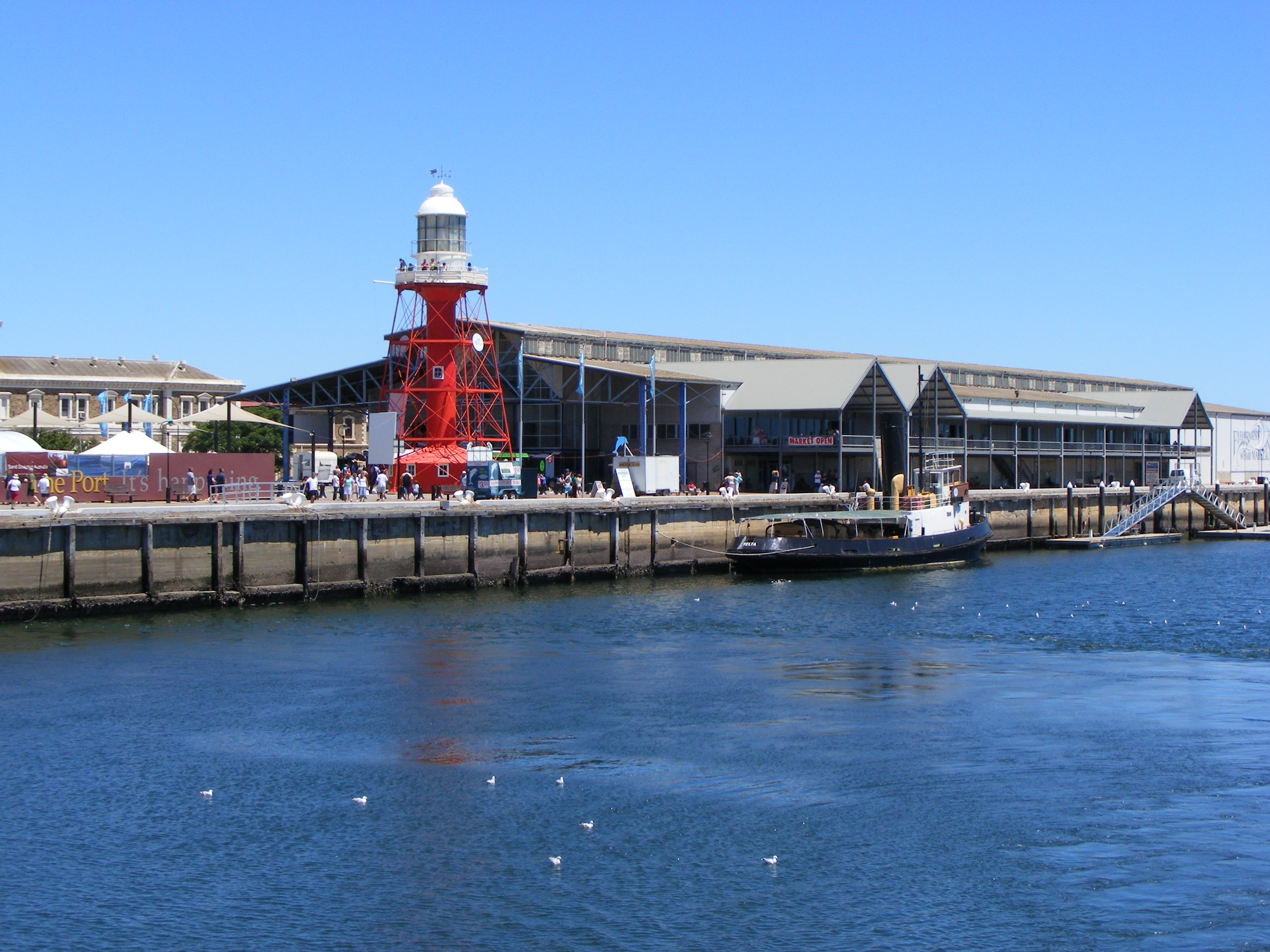
View of the Port Adelaide Lighthouse from the Port approach.

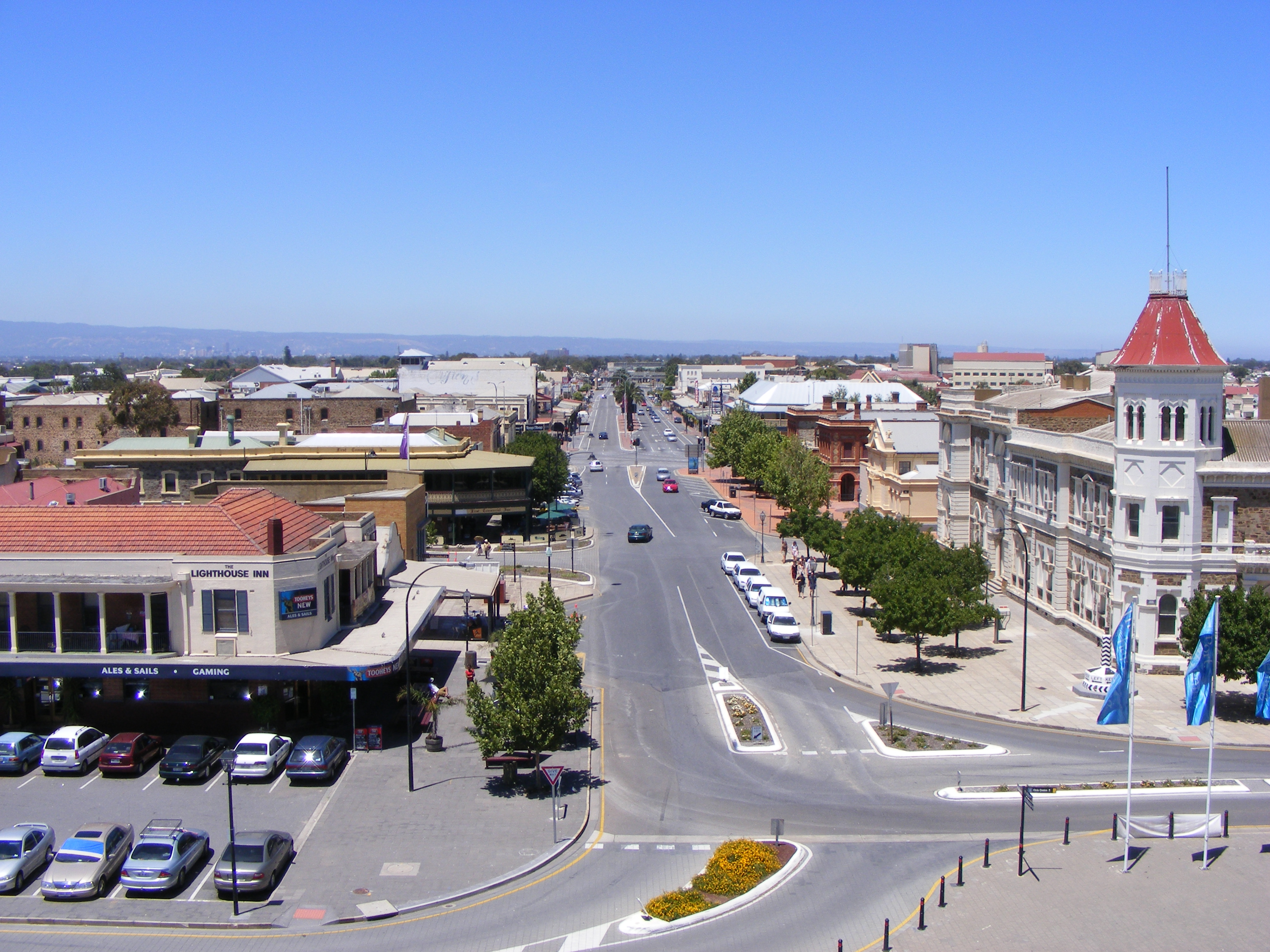
View from observation deck facing Port Rd and the city.

Illumination at night

== See also ==
- List of lighthouses in Australia
