= Neptune Islands =

Two groups of islands in South Australia

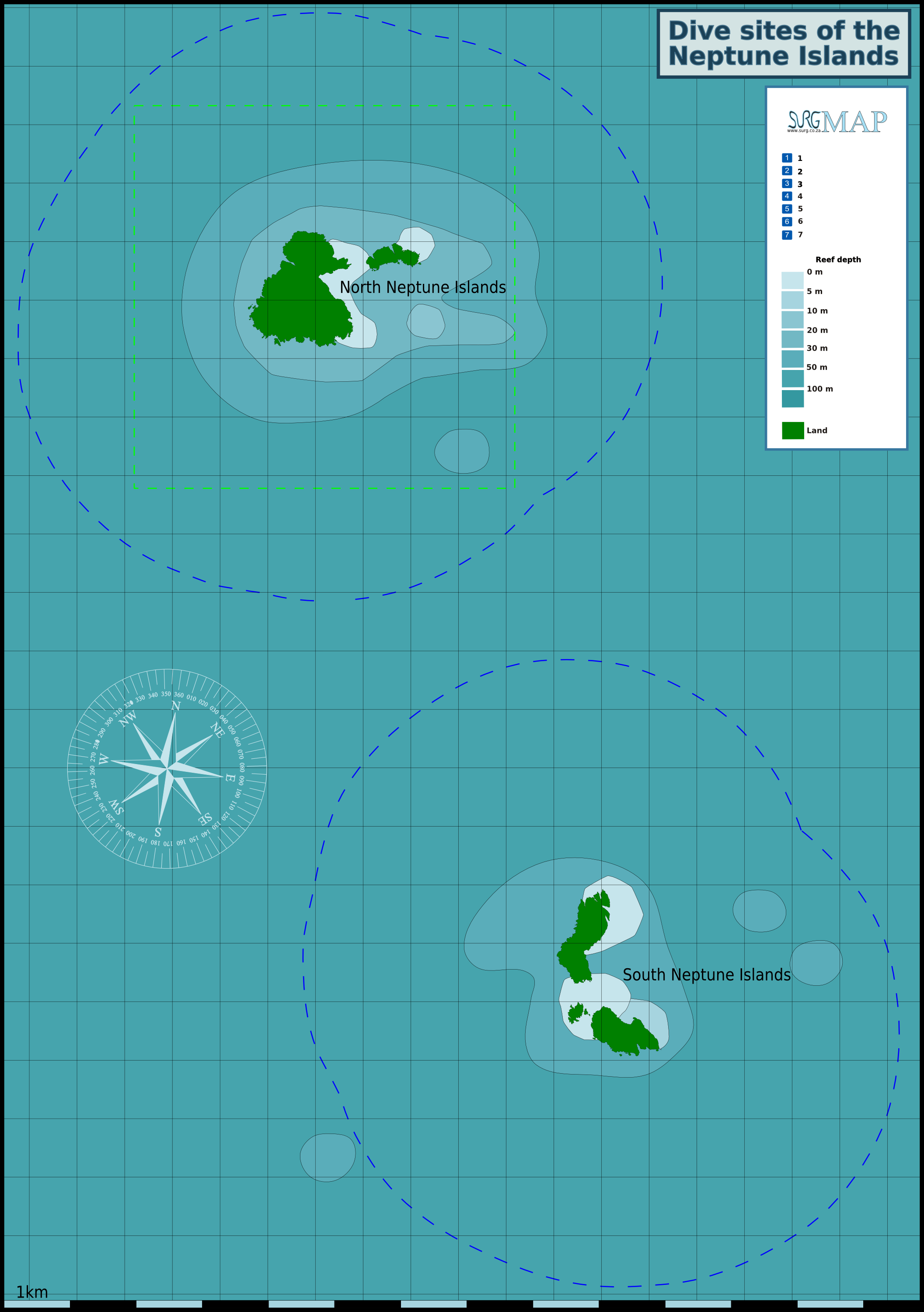
- Dive sites of the Neptune Islands

- Location within South Australia

Geography
- Location: Great Australian Bight
- Coordinates: 35°14′20″S 136°04′11″E
- Total islands: Six (excluding unnamed islets)
- Major islands: North Neptune Islands: * West Island * East Island South Neptune Islands: * Main Island * Middle Island * Lighthouse Island Neptune Islands archipelago: * Low Rocks

Administration
- Australia

The Neptune Islands consist of two groups of islands, and an archipelago of smaller islets, located close to the entrance to Spencer Gulf in South Australia. They are well known as a venue for great white shark tourism.

== Description ==
The Neptune Islands consists of two groups of islands, the North Neptune Islands and the South Neptune Islands. These both sit on the southern aspect of the Australasian continental shelf separated by a distance of 9 km (5.6 mi). The North Neptune Islands which are 27.8 km (17.3 mi) south south-east from the mainland at Cape Catastrophe, consist of a large island of 49 m (161 ft) height and a small islet of 29 m (95 ft) height located 300 m (980 ft) from the main island's north-east point with a combined area of 2.43 km^{2} (0.94 mi^{2}). The South Neptune Islands which are 38.9 km (24.2 mi) south-south-east from the mainland at Cape Catastrophe are more evenly portioned in height with the northern island being 35 m (115 ft) high and the southern island (also known as Lighthouse Island) rising to 37 m (121 ft). The Southern group has an area of 2.02 km^{2} (0.78 mi^{2}). A third feature associated with the overall island group is an outcrop of rocks known as Low Rocks located about 6.5 km (4.0 mi) north-north-east of the northern group of islands.

== Formation, geology and oceanography ==
The Neptune Islands were formed between 10,800 and 12,000 years ago when sea levels rose at the start of the Holocene.

The islands are remnant igneous inselbergs which have survived the erosive process associated with sea level rise. The remnant rock is described as being "a porphyritic granite gneiss and pink granite intruded with dolerite dykes". Remnants of the once-overlying calcarenite layers are also present on the upper platforms of the island. The soil is mainly derived from the weathering of the granite with a minor contribution from the weathering of calcarenite strata.

The seabed falls steeply away from the coast of both island groups. Water depths of 80 m (260 ft) are reached within a distance of 1.5 km (0.93 mi) from the Northern group and within 1.5 km to 2 km (1.2 mi) from the Southern group.

== Flora and fauna ==
=== Plants ===
While the low profile of the islands do limit what can grow due to wind exposure and salt spray, surveys have shown that the Northern island group (excluding the "small satellite islet") has 35 plant species while the Southern group has 28 species on its north island while Lighthouse Island has 13 species. The latter is attributed to combination of the disturbance caused by activity associated with the formerly staffed lighthouse, airstrip, an introduced goat population that was eradicated in 1968, and burrows made by the large numbers of short-tailed shearwaters. Plant species include sea celery, leek lily, flax lily, coast tussock grass, salt couch, billy button daisies, variable groundsel and an introduced Northern Hemisphere grass, rat's-tail fescue.

=== Terrestrial animals ===
The only mammals present are bush rats which are found on North Neptune Island.

Birds of prey include white-bellied sea-eagles, peregrine falcon and swamp harrier with Australian kestrels mainly concentrated on the northern island in the South group. Breeding colonies of Cape Barren geese are present on the Northern group while short-tailed shearwaters, silver gull and greater crested tern are present on the South group island.

Other landbirds include white-fronted chats, masked plovers, rock parrots, welcome swallows, silvereyes and stubble quails. Sparrows, an introduced species, have established themselves on Lighthouse island.

Reptiles identified during surveys include marbled geckos on both island groups while the following are limited to the main island in the Northern group - four-toed earless skink, bull skinks and western brown snakes. The latter are believed to prey on bush rat and bull shinks.

=== Marine animals ===
New Zealand fur-seals and Australian sea lions are common on all islands, using the island group for breeding.

Australian sea lions were already present in 1876 Australian sea lions were shot at the Neptune Islands for their hides and for "sport" during the 19th century. Large-scale hunting ceased in the 1920s, No baseline population data exists, but the species population and range have both decreased.

The introduction of the South Australian National Parks and Wildlife Act 1972 prohibited the killing of Australian sea lions statewide. The Australian sea lion was listed as vulnerable under the Commonwealth Environment Protection and Biodiversity Conservation Act 1999 in 2005 and is also listed as a threatened species in each state in its range (South Australia and Western Australia).

Nevertheless the presence of these pinniped colonies supports a migratory population of great white sharks.

==== Little penguin colony ====
Little penguins were present on the Neptune Islands in 1840, 1876, 1877, 1899, 1901, 1907, 1925 and 1934.

In April 1877, the south island reportedly "swarmed with mutton-birds and penguin". A Mr Boucaut collected a pair of live penguins on this occasion to provide to the Botanical Garden.

In 1899, it was reported that South Neptune Island "abounded with penguin, and the sandy beach was a favourite resort of the hair seal." In 1901, a visiting party on the Governor Musgrave described the island thus: "Penguins are fairly numerous; but excepting an occasional seal or two the mutton birds monopolize the island." Another account of the visit said of the muttonbirds: "At night these birds create an indescribable din, in company with the penguins, of which also there is a large number about the various rocks of its coastline." In 1907, visitors landed in May and found a few penguins in burrows along with evidence of recent occupation.

Little penguin breeding sites were noted on North Neptune Island in a 1996 survey of South Australia's offshore islands.

None were found in 2006 and the colony is now believed to be extinct.

== History ==
The islands were first sighted by Europeans on Sunday 21 February 1802 from HMS Investigator whilst under the command of Matthew Flinders. The islands were named Neptune's Isles, "for they seemed to be inaccessible to men". The islands were subsequently visited by John Lort Stokes in 1840 and later in 1873-74 by Captain F. Howard, RN as part of an ongoing South Australian Government program to map the colony’s waters, identify shipping hazards and assess the suitability of the coastline for settlement.

In the 19th century, the islands were visited by "sporting" parties who shot and killed Australian sea-lions and other wildlife.

During World War II, the Neptune Islands became a strategic military site due to its lighthouse’s location at the approaches to both Spencer Gulf and Investigator Strait. This is evident in the act of the placement of a mine field approximately 25 mi (40 km) west-south west of the Neptune Islands by the German auxiliary cruiser Pinguin during November 1940. A naval depot including huts and observation towers was established on South Neptune Island along with a gun which was regularly fired.

The South Neptune Island Lighthouse Complex is listed on the South Australian Heritage Register.

In the 1970s, the Neptune Islands were a filming location where live-action shark sequences of the ground-breaking blockbuster Jaws were filmed.

In 2012, the Neptune Islands Conservation Park was designated as a marine park. To this day, it endures a popular location for cage diving with great white sharks.

== Navigation aids ==
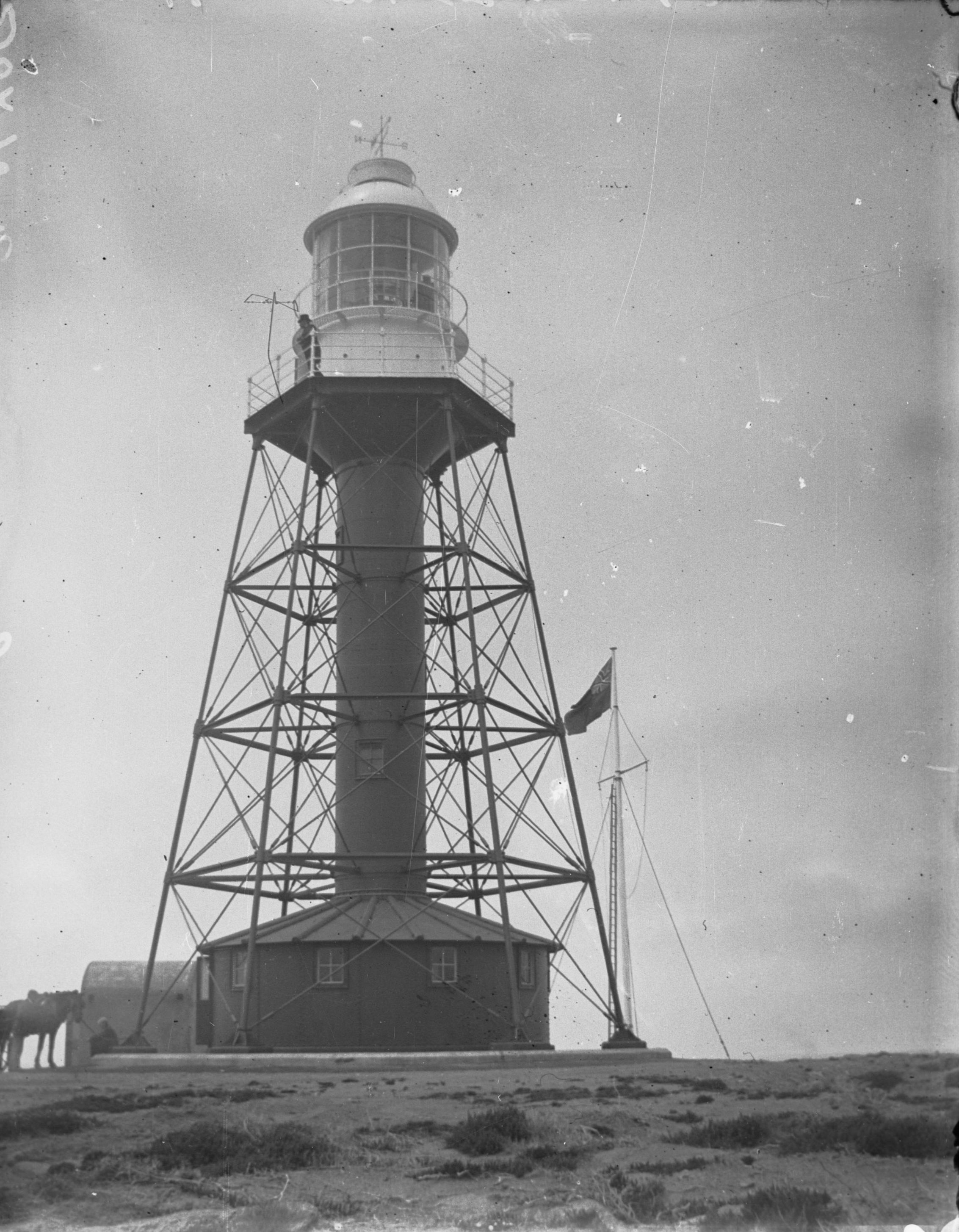
South Neptune Island Lighthouse 1901-1985

Navigation aids have been located on islands within the Neptune Islands Group since the early 20th century.

The need for a lighthouse in the Neptune Islands was considered for many years during the 19th century due to the islands' relatively low elevation. In 1901, the light tower from the Port Adelaide Entrance light was relocated to South Neptune Island. That was eventually replaced by a small brick tower in 1985, and the old tower was transported to Port Adelaide on MV Cape Don to become part of the collection of the South Australian Maritime Museum, which opened in 1986. The new lighthouse was converted to automatic operation in 1990 resulting in the departure of the lighthouse keepers and their families.

Located on the largest island in the southern group, a light mounted on a 12-metre-high (39 ft) tower commenced operation in 1983. It was removed in 2002-2003.

== Climate ==
Neptune Island has a Mediterranean Climate (Csb) with mild summers and cool winters. The island gets only 45.6 clear days annually. Coastal weather observations have been obtained by the Australian Bureau of Meteorology at the South Neptune Islands since 1957. Initially, observations were made by the lighthouse keepers residing on the Island at three hourly intervals. As of 2014, observations are made via an automatic weather station (AWS).

Climate data for Neptune Island
Month	Jan	Feb	Mar	Apr	May	Jun	Jul	Aug	Sep	Oct	Nov	Dec	Year
Record high °C (°F)	36.9 (98.4)	36.8 (98.2)	34.6 (94.3)	29.4 (84.9)	24.0 (75.2)	21.7 (71.1)	22.5 (72.5)	25.9 (78.6)	27.6 (81.7)	28.8 (83.8)	34.4 (93.9)	35.1 (95.2)	36.9 (98.4)
Mean daily maximum °C (°F)	22.1 (71.8)	22.3 (72.1)	21.1 (70.0)	19.5 (67.1)	17.8 (64.0)	16.0 (60.8)	15.3 (59.5)	15.4 (59.7)	16.2 (61.2)	17.5 (63.5)	19.2 (66.6)	20.5 (68.9)	18.6 (65.5)
Mean daily minimum °C (°F)	16.2 (61.2)	16.6 (61.9)	16.0 (60.8)	15.0 (59.0)	13.7 (56.7)	12.3 (54.1)	11.3 (52.3)	11.1 (52.0)	11.6 (52.9)	12.3 (54.1)	13.6 (56.5)	14.9 (58.8)	13.7 (56.7)
Record low °C (°F)	9.4 (48.9)	8.9 (48.0)	9.0 (48.2)	6.1 (43.0)	6.7 (44.1)	6.4 (43.5)	5.0 (41.0)	4.4 (39.9)	4.5 (40.1)	6.1 (43.0)	7.2 (45.0)	8.2 (46.8)	4.4 (39.9)
Average rainfall mm (inches)	12.6 (0.50)	14.0 (0.55)	19.6 (0.77)	31.2 (1.23)	54.3 (2.14)	67.9 (2.67)	76.2 (3.00)	62.3 (2.45)	45.8 (1.80)	26.7 (1.05)	18.3 (0.72)	17.1 (0.67)	446 (17.55)
Average rainy days	4.5	4.2	6.8	10.0	15.2	16.9	18.1	17.8	13.9	9.9	7.2	6.8	131.3
Source: Bureau of Meteorology

== Economic activity ==
=== Guano ===
The Neptune Islands were one of the island sites from which guano was mined under licence from the South Australian Government prior to 1919.

=== Fishing ===
The waters around the Neptune Islands outside of the protected area (see below) are commercially fished for abalone, marine scalefish, rock lobster and sardine. Bycatch includes commercially attractive species such as giant crab and octopus.

=== Tourism and other spin-offs ===
Despite their remoteness, the Neptune Islands are regarded as one of South Australia's best scuba diving sites, specifically for the viewing of Great white sharks. The Neptune Islands, particularly the North Neptune Islands, has been a shark cage diving destination since the late 1970s. Since 2002, it is the only site within Australia where this activity is legally permitted. Cage diving charters have attracted professional photographers and others whose efforts are considered by individuals such as Rodney Fox as having "significantly contributed to worldwide knowledge of shark physiology and behavior, because film, video, television and print media associated with shark viewing and research activities at the Neptune Islands, have reached a very large global audience". Other tourist activities include charter fishing, marine mammal watching and cruise ship visits.

== Protected areas ==
=== Neptune Islands Conservation Park ===
The Neptune Islands Conservation Park includes all the islands in the Group and adjoining waters within 2 nautical miles (3.7 kilometres; 2.3 miles) of low water mark with the exception of Lighthouse Island in the South Neptune Islands and Low Rocks. The island group with exception to those areas under the control of the Australian government first obtained protected area status as a fauna conservation reserve declared under the Crown Lands Act 1929-1966 on 16 March 1967 to mainly to conserve the New Zealand fur seal breeding colony on the southern island of the North Neptune Islands which is one of the largest in Australia. Other features that contributed to the declaration include the small breeding population of Australian sea lions on the North Neptune Islands, Australian sea lion haul out areas located on the South Neptune Islands, and the breeding/nesting populations of Cape Barren goose, white-bellied sea eagle, osprey and peregrine falcon. The fauna conservation reserve was reconstituted as the Neptune Islands Conservation Park under the National Parks and Wildlife Act 1972 in 1972 with the extension over adjoining waters being added in 1997.

=== Neptune Islands Group (Ron and Valerie Taylor) Marine Park ===
The Neptune Islands Group (Ron and Valerie Taylor) Marine Park consists of two separate areas - the waters within two nautical miles of the coastline of both the North Neptune Islands and the South Neptune Islands at median high water. The northern area is zoned as a habitat protection area with a smaller sanctuary area immediately adjoining the island group while the southern area is zoned for habitat protection. Both areas are also zoned as restricted areas in order to manage access to both the islands and the surrounding waters. The marine park came into existence on 29 November 2012 as part of a state wide network of marine protected areas. When announcing the launch of the marine park network, Jay Weatherill, the South Australian Premier, announced the renaming of the Neptune Islands Group Marine Park to the Neptune Islands Group (Ron and Valerie Taylor) Marine Park in recognition of the contributions of Ron Taylor and Valerie Taylor to "the conservation of sharks, sea lions and other marine species".

=== Administration ===
Administratively, the Neptune Islands Group (Ron and Valerie Taylor) Marine Park entity "overlays" the entirety of the Neptune Islands Conservation Park. Activities within the dual entity is restricted to "scientific research, tourism operations, competitions and organised events, commercial film-making (including sound recording and photography), installation of vessel moorings" and any activity that can be argued on a merit basis. Access to both terrestrial and marine areas is controlled by a permit system administered by one government agency.

== Cultural heritage ==
=== Aboriginal heritage ===
Little is known about Aboriginal heritage associated with the Neptune Islands. While it is likely that the islands can be seen from the Eyre Peninsula coastline and that the Islands may have been more accessible to Aboriginal people during the recent ice age than during the present day, native title claims lodged in 1996 and 1997 respectively for southern Eyre Peninsula by the Barngarla and the Nauo peoples did not include the Islands.

=== Lighthouse facility ===
The keepers' cottages, store, outbuildings, stone fences, stone rainwater tanks, grave sites & footings of the now-removed first lighthouse collectively known as the South Neptune Island Lighthouse Complex are protected under the Heritage Places Act 1993 (SA) and the Development Act 1993 (SA).

=== Shipwrecks ===
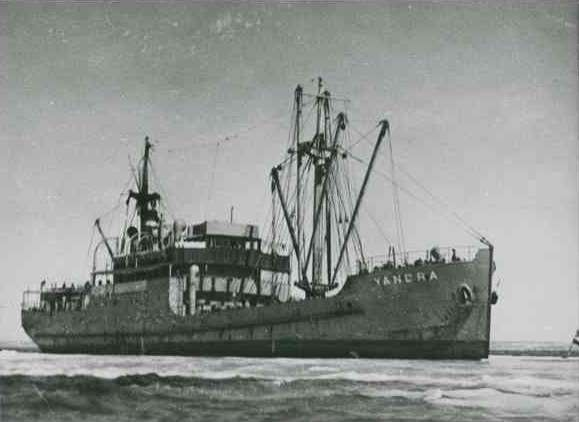
SS Yandra, about 1930

- Frances, cutter, wrecked at South Neptune Island on 29 August 1840.
- Venus, cutter, wrecked at North Neptune Island on 14 June 1946.
- Yandra, motor vessel, ran aground in dense fog onto South Neptune Island on 25 January 1959.
- Saint Michele, fishing boat, wrecked at South Neptune Island on 30 March 1965.
- Gloridia V, cray-fishing boat, wrecked at North Neptune Island on 12 March 1977.
- Cinderella, fishing boat, wrecked at Low Rocks on 24 May 1982.
- Gypsy Rose, fishing boat, wrecked on South Neptune Island on 14 January 1988.

== See also ==
- SS Hertford
