= Shark tourism =

Tourism industry for viewing wild sharks

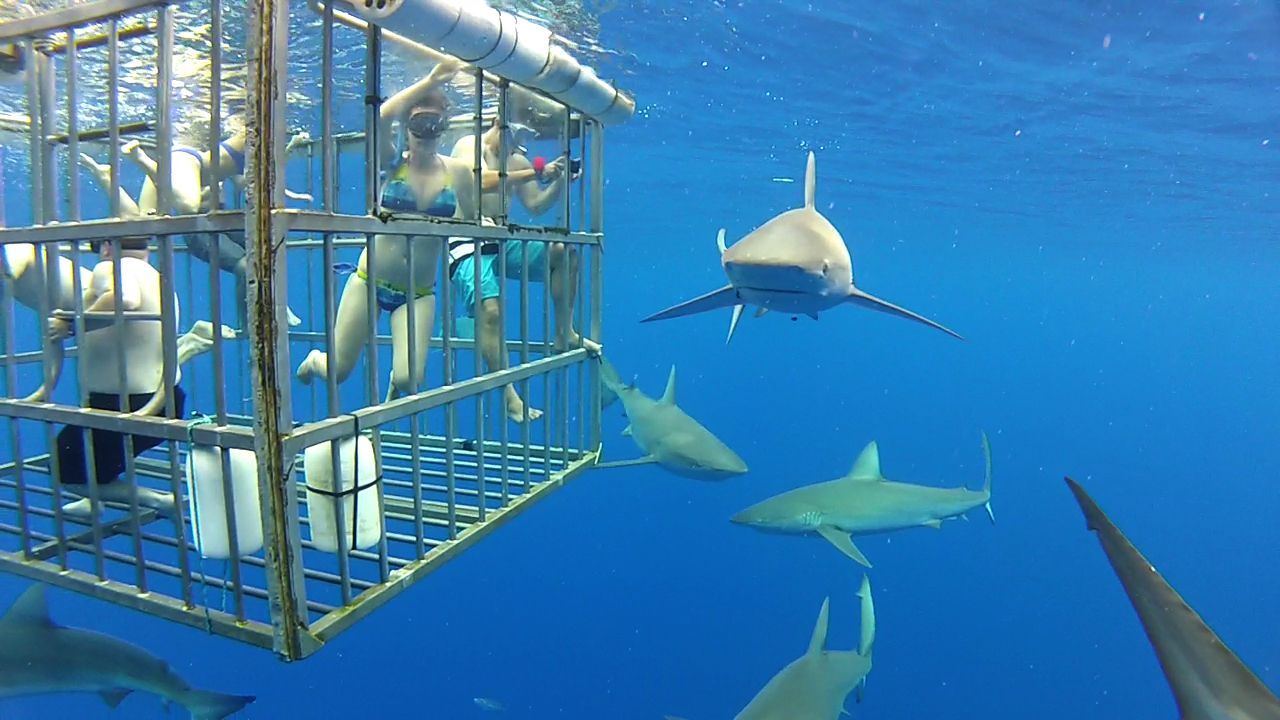
Shark cage diving

Shark tourism is a form of eco-tourism that allows people to dive with sharks in their natural environment. This benefits local shark populations by educating tourists and through funds raised by the shark tourism industry. Communities that previously relied on shark finning to make their livelihoods are able to make a larger profit from diving tours while protecting the local environment. People can get close to the sharks by free- or scuba diving or by entering the water in a protective cage for more aggressive species. Many of these dives are done by private companies and are often baited to ensure shark sightings, a practice which is highly controversial and under review in many areas.

== Types of shark ==
Species commonly targeted in shark tourism activities include:

- Great white sharks – mainly surface viewing in cages
- Tiger, bull, oceanic whitetip, and other less aggressive (but potentially dangerous) sharks – in the pelagic zone
- Sand tiger sharks – tend to congregate on certain reefs and wrecks at specific times of the year
- Basking and whale sharks – non-aggressive plankton feeders
- Oceanic Black Tip Sharks – known for their sleek and slender build and are potentially aggressive

=== Great white shark ===
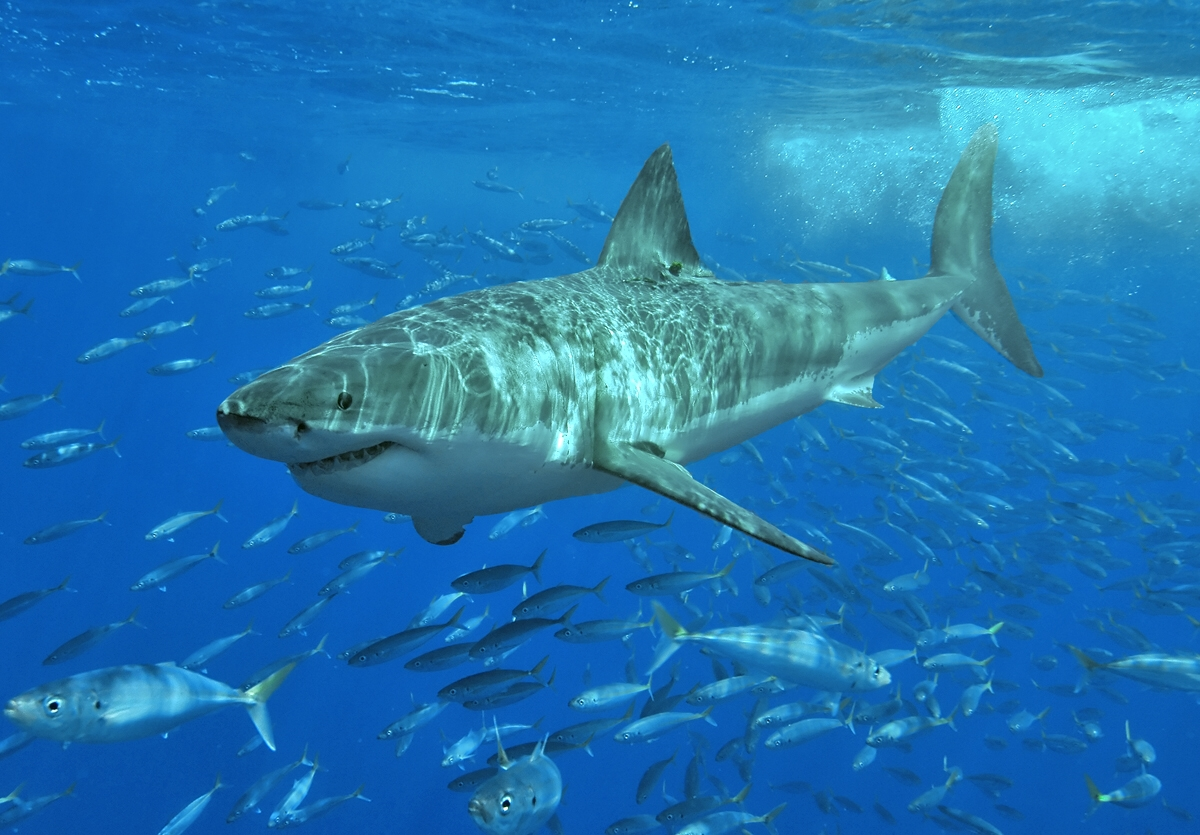
Great white shark at Isla Guadalupe, Mexico, August 2006. Animal estimated at 11–12 feet (3.3 to 3.6 m) in length, age unknown.

Great white shark viewing is available at the Neptune Islands in South Australia, South Africa, Isla Guadalupe in Mexico, and New Zealand. Great white sharks are usually viewed using shark cages to protect the diver. Because of the exceptional visibility underwater in Isla Guadalupe, more outside the cage diving is done than anywhere else.

The great white shark viewing industry was founded in the 1970s by pioneer Australian diver and great white attack survivor Rodney Fox in South Australia. He was the sole worldwide operator until the South African industry was founded in early 1989 by Pieter van der Walt who was joined shortly thereafter by pioneer diver and underwater photographer George Askew who handled promotions and put South African cage diving "on the map" with the publicity he got – until they split in January 1992, after they, together with famous Australian divers Ron Taylor and Valerie Taylor, did the world's first dive amongst great white sharks without a cage and completely unprotected.

This dive was directly responsible for the upsurge in shark tourism – especially free-diving (i.e. out of cage) swimming with big sharks. When operators around the world became aware that the great white was quite approachable and not likely to attack they considered whether the other sharks with bad reputations like tigers, bulls and oceanics' might be safe enough to swim with too. This proved to be the case and shark tourism has become a multi-million-dollar a year industry. In attempts to protect the great white shark species, in some places such as South Australia, there is mandatory logbook reporting and photograph/identification required to monitor how cage-diving tourism may impact white sharks involved in these tourism interactions.

=== Tiger, bull and oceanic white tip ===
The Bahamas is a favorite region for pelagic sharks. Divers in the Bahamas experience reef sharks and tiger sharks while they are hand-fed. Isla Guadalupe, Mexico, has been named a Biosphere Reserve in an effort to control the shark diving activities there. Although the practice of shark diving proves to be controversial, it has been proven very effective in attracting tourists. Whale sharks, while not traditionally harvested for their fins but are sometimes harvested for their meat, have also benefited from shark tourism because of snorkelers getting into the water with the gentle giants. In the Philippines snorkelers must maintain a distance of four feet from the sharks and there is a fine and possible jail time for anyone who touches the animals.

Several shark species are known from shark feeding dive sites within the Pacific Region. Grey reef sharks are the main feeders in places such as the Great Barrier Reef, Micronesia and Tahiti. Silvertips and black tip reef sharks tend to be more seen around the Papua New Guinea coastlines. Bull sharks are found around Mexico, Playa del Carmen in particular.

=== Whale shark ===
Whale sharks attract a large amount of tourists each year to South Ari Atoll in the Republic of Maldives, yet, there is still some ambiguity regarding the economic extent of the attraction of these animals, thus making conservation/ implementation of management methods difficult to conduct.

Additionally, whale sharks in the waters of the small town of Oslob, on Cebu islands in the Philippines, The sharks have become a top tourist attraction, local governments in the Philippines have followed along in the legalization of feeding these animals in attempt to attract more tourists. Although a huge commercial success, there is growing concern for the implementation of regulation and protection for the whale sharks and its marine environment.

The coral reefs in the Philippines are being harmed greatly by the overpopulation of sharks and people in the area. As the population increases immensely so does the opportunity for the coral reefs to diminish. Sharks are overpopulating because they are being fed by tour operators and it is attracting many more sharks to the area than there naturally would be. This is causing the sharks to be more aggressive with people because they are getting too comfortable with people because they are associating feeding time with the people that are tossing the food to them.

== Diving mode ==
=== Freediving ===
Free Diving with Sharks in Jupiter, Florida

This type of shark tourism is done by professionals who dive down with the individuals that are partaking in the tourism event. A diver takes a small group of people down approximately 40 meters deep where the shark actions takes place. Often sharks do not pay much attention to the divers, but in rare cases when there are threatening times the operator uses his/her training skills to prevent an attack from occurring.

=== Cage diving ===
Shark cage diving is scuba diving or snorkeling where the observer remains inside a protective cage designed to prevent sharks from making contact with the divers. Shark cage diving is used for scientific observation, underwater cinematography, and as a tourist activity. Sharks may be attracted to the vicinity of the cage by the use of bait, in a procedure known as chumming, which has attracted some controversy as it is claimed to potentially alter the natural behaviour of sharks in the vicinity of swimmers.

Similar cages are also used purely as a protective measure for divers working in waters where potentially dangerous shark species are known to be present. In this application the shark-proof cage may be used as a refuge, or as a diving stage during descent and ascent, particularly during staged decompression where the divers may be vulnerable while constrained to a specific depth in mid-water for several minutes. In other applications a mobile cage may be carried by the diver while harvesting organisms such as abalone.

== Economic valuation of whale shark tourism ==
Previous economic valuation of whale shark tourism (in US million dollars).

Valuations reported in other currencies were converted to US$ using the average official rate for the year of 2007.

| Location (season duration) | Year | Total expenditure | Expenditure on WS excursions | Method | Reference |
|---|---|---|---|---|---|
| Belize (6 wks) | 2002 | $3.7 | – | Direct spend | Graham (2003) |
| Seychelles (14 wks) | 2003 | – | $1.2 | Contingent | Cesar et al. (2004) |
| | 2007 | $3.9–5.0 | – | Direct spend | H Newman et al., 2007, unpublished data^{a} |
| Ningaloo (9 wks) | 1994 | $4.7 | $1.0 | Direct spend | Davis et al. (1997) |
| | 2004 | $13.3 | – | Unknown | Norman (2005) |
| | 2006 | $4.5 | $2.3 | Direct spend | Catlin et al. (2010b) |
| | 2006 | $1.8–3.5 | – | Substitution value | Catlin et al. (2010b) |

Whale sharks are considered a vulnerable species, and in certain areas such as Ningaloo Marine Park, they are entirely protected. The whale sharks in the area are considered highly valuable in the ecotourism industry, as the industry provides numerous jobs to local people and brings in US$12 million annually. Tourist interest in wildlife tourism continues to grow, and the whale shark tourism industry is expected to increase through the year 2020.

== Conservation benefits ==
Shark tourism opened up a beneficial economic opportunity all over the globe. This helps the poverty stricken areas of the Bahamas, Moorea, Maldives, Australia and many more places around the globe. A study done in French Polynesia concluded that a single reef shark is worth US$100,000 a year compared to the $100 an individual may receive for harvesting a sharks' body parts. Shark tourism is positively impacting the lives of many, as companies are not only making money for themselves and the community, but many profits benefit reef conservation efforts. Tourism providers often provide food to attract sharks to areas where they can be more easily viewed, although this is controversial. In Australia's Great Barrier Reef Marine Park and the states of Hawaii and Florida shark feeding is prohibited. The initial law in Hawaii that prohibited shark feeding was passed in 2002, but many companies were not following this law and locals pushed for stricter enforcement.

== Venues ==
=== Ningaloo Marine Park ===
Ningaloo Marine Park in Western Australia is the site of an annual whale shark aggregation. This site is a very popular tourist site, as whale sharks are incredibly gentle creatures that pose very little threat to humans. Introduced in 1997 and revised to its current version in 2013, the Department of Parks and Wildlife is responsible for a whale shark management program designed to protect the whale shark species and regulate human interaction with them.

==== Licensing ====
The shark tourism industry is meant to educate and increase awareness of the natural environment as well as generate profits for the local people. Data from the years 2006 to 2010 on whale sharks at Ningaloo Reef, Western Australia, has been evaluated to determine the scale of the tourism operations and the spatial and temporal distribution of interactions between whale sharks and humans; for example: whale shark tours at Ningaloo increased by about 70%. The whale shark management program of Ningaloo Marine Park relies on the Conservation and Land Management Act of 1984 (CALM Act) and the Wildlife Conservation Act of 1950. The CALM Act requires tour operators to obtain a commercial tourist activity license, and the Wildlife Conservation Act requires a wildlife interaction license for each protected species a tour may come in contact with. This includes the whale sharks but is not limited to whales, other shark species, and dugongs. Under these laws, the Western Australian government is able to regulate how tourists interact with whale sharks and to what extent. A maximum of 15 operators are allowed to obtain licenses at a given time. In addition, only one tour vessel is allowed to travel to the whale sharks while the rest must stay 250 meters away. Only ten swimmers are allowed in the water at a time, which controls the crowding of the area, and tourists are prohibited from feeding or touching the whale sharks. The shark tourism industry conducted a search, using a global questionnaire; detecting that 42% of operators conducting shark tourism used an attractant to lure sharks, and that 93% of operators surveyed regulated their practices using codes of conduct.

=== Hawaii ===
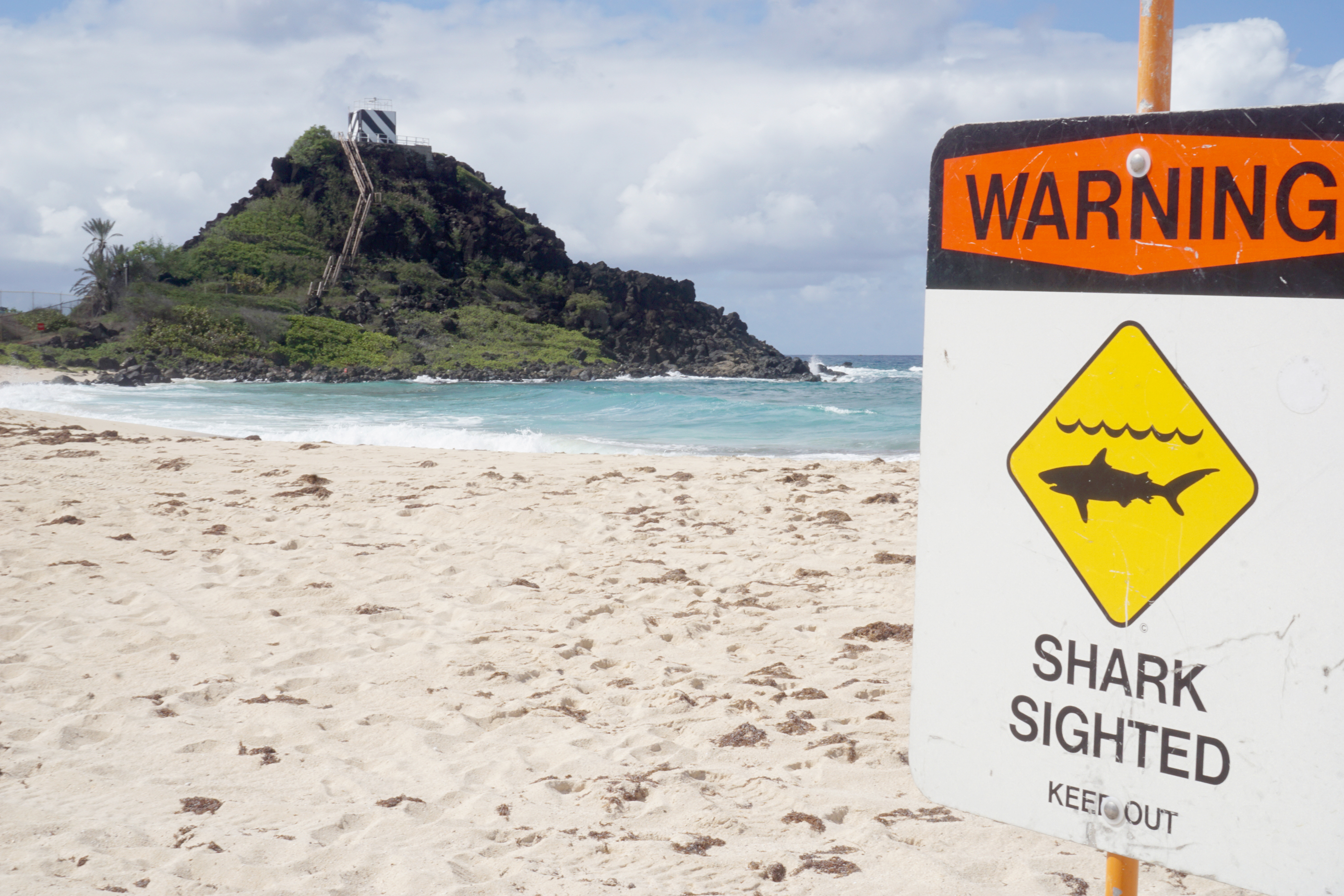
A sign at Pyramid Rock Beach in Hawaii warning about a shark sighting, 2015

Sharks, or "mano" as they are called by the local Hawaiians, are viewed as sacred. Early Hawaiians worshiped and protected the sharks which they saw as family gods or "aumaka". In recent years, shark cage diving has become a very profitable tourist attraction in the state. Native Hawaiians were not pleased with this at first due to the fact that the companies were luring in the sharks using bait; they viewed these animals as sacred and feeding them for entertainment was said to be unjust. There was also speculations that by feeding them, the sharks would begin to associate the boats and humans with food. For this reason, a law was passed in Hawaii in 2002 that banned the feeding of sharks in state waters, which is about three miles off shore.

=== Fiji ===
Beqa Lagoon is home to eight species of sharks, each of which are very prominent around feeding sites. Shark diving and shark feeding is very popular in the area, locals have been swimming with the sharks for close to three thousand years. The local people have many myths about these creatures passed down from antiquity. They are easily spotted in the waters of Beqa Lagoon Resort, which is their primary feeding ground. Shark tourism in places such as this is very profitable in Fiji, generating around US$42 million.

=== Palau ===
Palau is home to three species of sharks; the grey reef shark, the leopard shark, and the whitetip reef sharks. Palau's waters have many coral reefs, which are home to grey reef sharks, the most commonly seen of the three. Whitetip reef sharks are also seen around coral reefs, and are much more curious than the other sharks. Many tourists and locals are fascinated by these creatures, so that shark diving has become a big part of many tourists incentive to go to Palau. Studies have shown that shark diving and shark tourism in general is a major contributor to the economy of Palau. Over US$18 million is generated every year, which accounts for close to 10% of all domestic product in the country. The local communities and government benefit, receiving over $1 million and US$1.5 million respectively.

=== South Africa ===
South African is known for conservation of sharks and diversity of species on the coastline. Cape Town is known for Great whites and Seven-gill sharks and Aliwal Shoal and Protea Banks are known for ragged-tooth sharks (also known as grey nurse or spotted sand tiger sharks), hammerhead schools, white tips reef sharks, oceanic black tip sharks, bull sharks (Zambezi), tiger sharks and the occasional great white sighting. These sites providing experiences to scuba divers and cage divers.

== Special interest groups ==
Many people are involved in interest groups such as the late iDive Sharks Network that aim to celebrate and promote safe and responsible shark diving activities.

There are several groups that promote "Eco-Friendly Shark Tours" that raise public awareness of anti-poaching campaigns, initiatives that involve shark tagging and habitat restoration, as well as bringing attention to the essential part of marine life sharks play.
