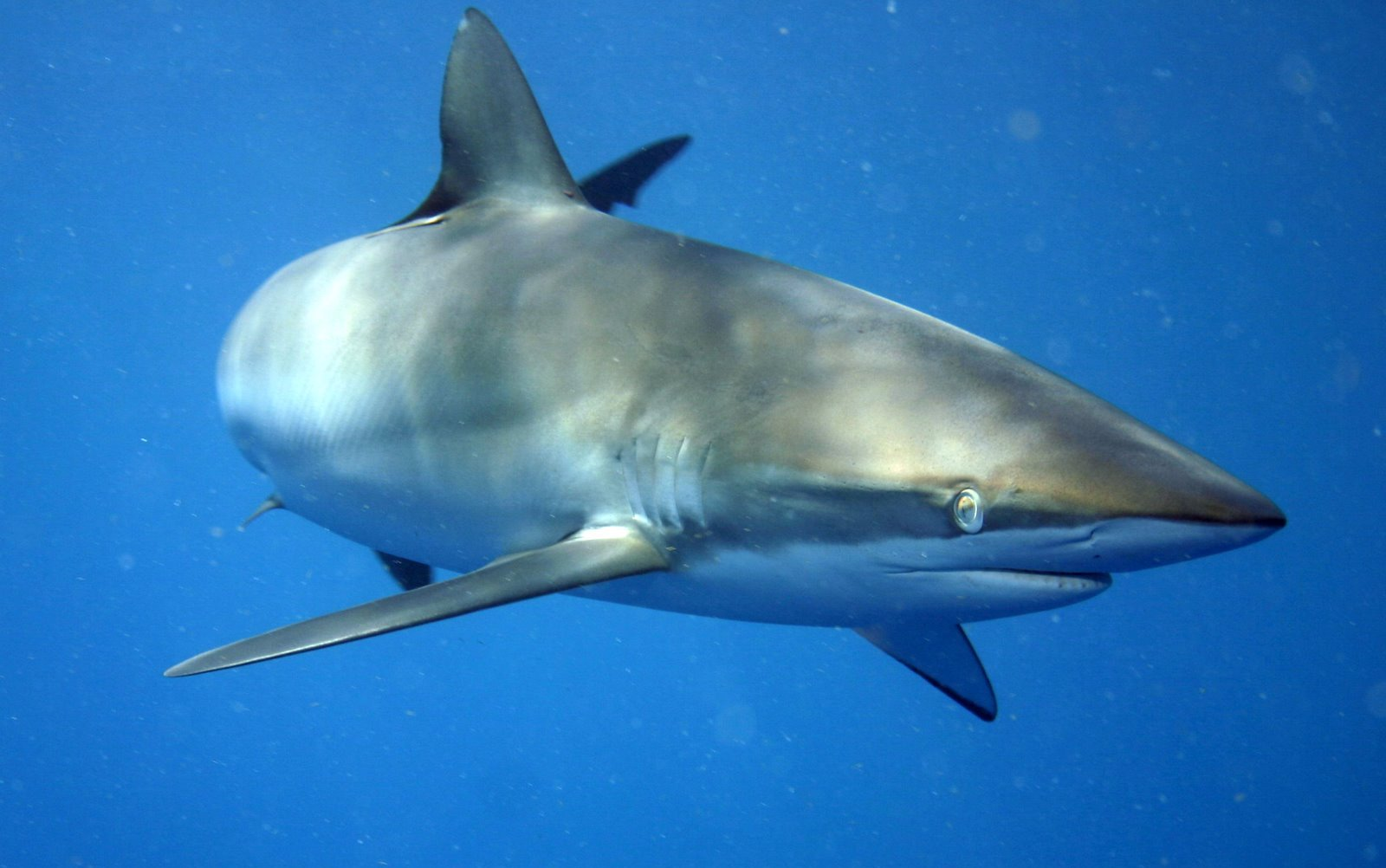

Conservation status
- Vulnerable (IUCN 3.1)
- CITES Appendix II

Scientific classification
- Kingdom: Animalia
- Phylum: Chordata
- Class: Chondrichthyes
- Subclass: Elasmobranchii
- Division: Selachii
- Order: Carcharhiniformes
- Family: Carcharhinidae
- Genus: Carcharhinus
- Species: C. falciformis

Binomial name
- Carcharhinus falciformis (J. P. Müller & Henle, 1839)
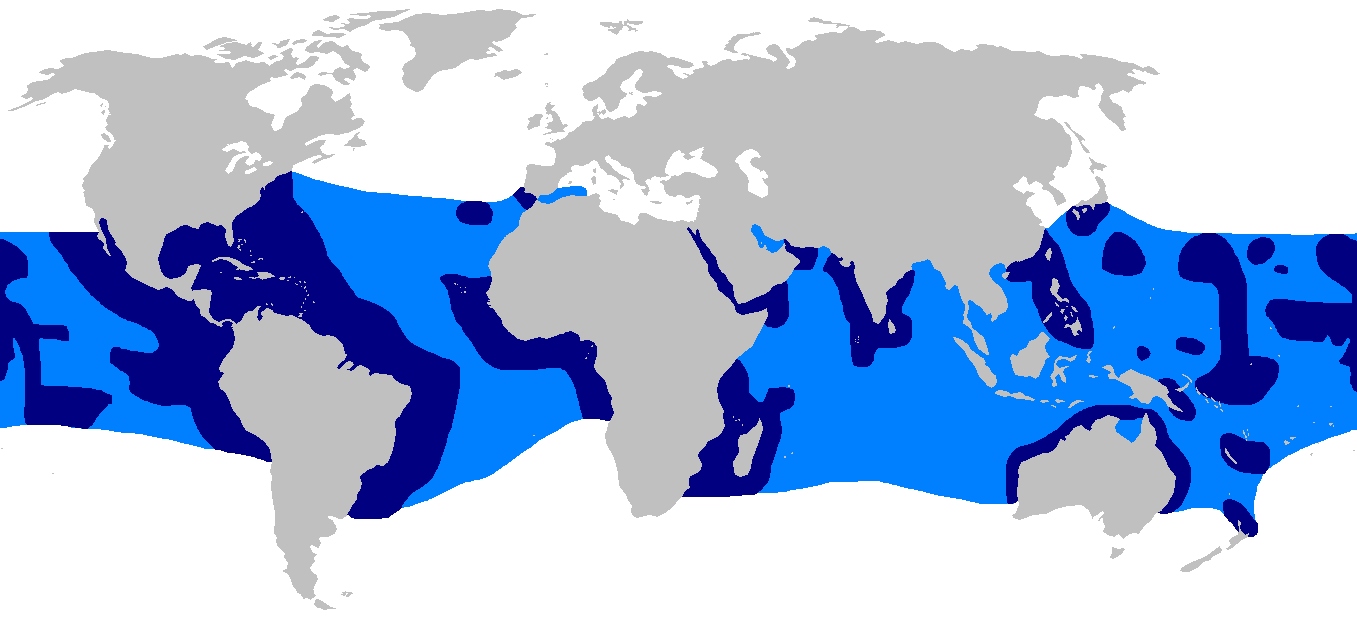
- Confirmed (dark blue) and suspected (light blue) range of the silky shark

Synonyms
- Carcharias falciformis Müller & Henle, 1839; Carcharhinus falciformes (Müller & Henle, 1839); Carcharius falcipinnis Lowe, 1839; Carcharias falcipinnis Lowe, 1839; Carcharias menisorrah Müller & Henle, 1839; Carcharhinus menisorrah (Müller & Henle, 1839); Eulamia menisorrah (Müller & Henle, 1839); Carcharhinus menisorrah (Müller & Henle, 1839); Carcharins menisorrah Müller & Henle, 1839; Carcharius menisorrah Müller & Henle, 1839; Squalus tiburo Poey, 1860; Prionodon tiburo (Poey, 1860 ); Gymnorhinus pharaonis Hemprich & Ehrenberg, 1899; Aprionodon sitankaiensis Herre, 1934; Carcharhinus floridanus Bigelow, Schroeder & Springer, 1943; Eulamia malpeloensis Fowler, 1944; Carcharhinus atrodorsus Deng, Xiong & Zhan, 1981

= Silky shark =

Silky shark Temporal range: Early Miocene to present

Species of cartilaginous fish

The silky shark (Carcharhinus falciformis), also known by numerous names such as blackspot shark, gray whaler shark, olive shark, ridgeback shark, sickle shark, sickle-shaped shark and sickle silk shark, is a species of requiem shark, in the family Carcharhinidae, named for the smooth texture of its skin. It is one of the most abundant sharks in the pelagic zone, and can be found around the world in tropical waters. Highly mobile and migratory, this shark is most often found over the edge of the continental shelf down to 50 m (164 ft). The silky shark has a slender, streamlined body and typically grows to a length of 2.5 m (8 ft 2 in). It can be distinguished from other large requiem sharks by its relatively small first dorsal fin with a curving rear margin, its tiny second dorsal fin with a long free rear tip, and its long, sickle-shaped pectoral fins. It is a deep, metallic bronze-gray above and white below.

With prey often scarce in its oceanic environment, the silky shark is a swift, inquisitive, and persistent hunter. It feeds mainly on bony fishes and cephalopods, and has been known to drive them into compacted schools before launching open-mouthed, slashing attacks. This species often trails schools of tuna, a favored prey. Its sense of hearing is highly acute, allowing it to localize the low-frequency noises generated by other feeding animals, and, by extension, sources of food. The silky shark is viviparous, meaning that the developing embryos are sustained by a placental connection to their mother. Significant geographical variation is seen in its life history details. Reproduction occurs year-round except in the Gulf of Mexico, where it follows a seasonal cycle. Females give birth to litters of up to 16 pups annually or biennially. The newborn sharks spend their first months in relatively sheltered reef nurseries on the outer continental shelf, growing substantially before moving into the open ocean.

The large size and cutting teeth of the silky shark make it potentially dangerous, and it has behaved aggressively towards divers. However, attacks are rare, as few humans enter its oceanic habitat. Silky sharks are valued for their fins, and to a lesser extent their meat, hide, liver oil, and jaws. Because of their abundance, they form a major component of commercial and artisanal shark fisheries in many countries. Furthermore, their association with tuna results in many sharks being taken as bycatch in tuna fisheries. Although slow-reproducing like most other sharks, the wide distribution and large population of the silky shark was once thought to buffer the species against fishing pressures. However, data suggest that silky shark numbers are declining around the world, which prompted the IUCN to reassess its conservation status to Vulnerable in 2017.

== Taxonomy ==
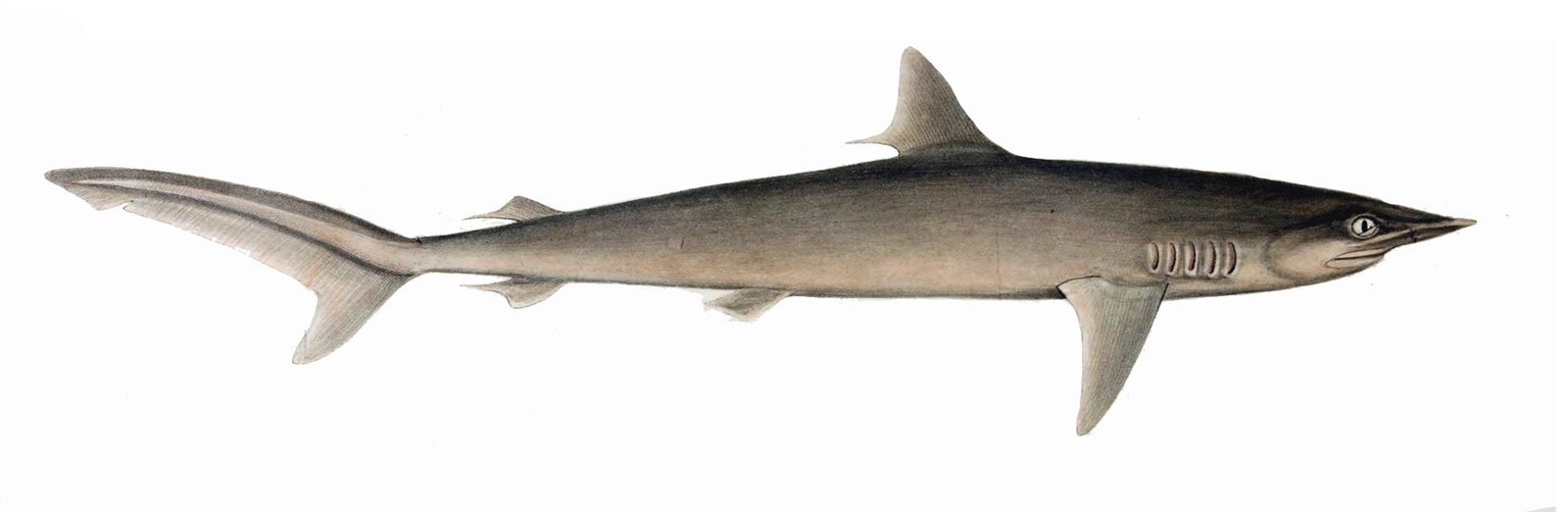
Müller and Henle's illustration of a silky shark, accompanying their original species description

A scientific description of the silky shark was first published by the German biologists Johannes Müller and Jakob Henle under the name Carcharias (Prionodon) falciformis, in their 1839 Systematische Beschreibung der Plagiostomen. Subsequent authors have assigned this species to the genus Carcharhinus. Because Müller and Henle's type specimen was a 53-cm-long female fetus from Cuba, adult silky sharks were historically not recognized as C. falciformis and were described as a separate species, Carcharhinus floridanus, by Henry Bigelow, William Schroeder, and Stewart Springer in 1943. Jack Garrick, Richard Backus, and Robert Gibbs Jr. synonymized C. floridanus with C. falciformis in 1964.

The specific epithet falciformis is Latin for "sickle-shaped", which refers to the outline of the dorsal and pectoral fins. The silky shark's common name comes from the fine texture of its skin compared to other sharks, a product of its tiny, densely packed dermal denticles. It may also be referred to as blackspot shark (usually used for C. sealei), grey reef shark (usually used for C. amblyrhynchos), grey whaler shark, olive shark, reef shark, ridgeback shark, sickle shark, sickle silk shark, sickle-shaped shark, silk shark, and silky whaler.

== Phylogeny and evolution ==
- - - Carcharhinus altimus
    - Carcharhinus plumbeus
  - - Carcharhinus falciformis
    - - Carcharhinus perezi
      - - Carcharhinus galapagensis
        - Carcharhinus obscurus
        - Carcharhinus longimanus
        - Prionace glauca

Phylogenetic relationships of the silky shark, based on allozyme sequences

Fossilized teeth belonging to the silky shark have been found in North Carolina: from the vicinity of two baleen whales, one in mud dating to the Pleistocene-Holocene (circa 12,000 years ago) and the other in Goose Creek Limestone dating to the Late Pliocene (circa 3.5 million years ago – Mya), as well as from the Pungo River, dating to the Miocene (23–5.3 Mya). Fossil teeth have also been found in Pliocene strata at the Cava Serredi quarry in Tuscany, Italy. The Aquitanian-aged Khari Nadi Formation of western India likewise has had silky shark fossils recovered from it. The earliest presumed fossil teeth of this species are from the Early Miocene of Malta. †Carcharhinus elongatus, an earlier representative of its lineage with smooth-edged teeth, is known from Oligocene (34–23 Mya) deposits in the Old Church formation of Virginia, and the Ashley formation of South Carolina. A set of poorly described, Eocene (56–34 Mya) teeth resembling those of this species are known from Egypt.

Initial efforts to resolve the evolutionary relationships of the silky shark were inconclusive; based on morphology, Jack Garrick in 1982 suggested the blackspot shark (C. sealei) as its closest relative. In 1988, Leonard Compagno assigned it phenetically to an informal "transitional group" also containing the blacknose shark (C. acronotus), the blacktip reef shark (C. melanopterus), the nervous shark (C. cautus), the copper shark (C. brachyurus), and the night shark (C. signatus).

More recently, Gavin Naylor's 1992 phylogenetic analysis, based on allozyme sequence data, found that the silky shark is part of a group containing large sharks with a ridge between the dorsal fins. One branch within this group contains the sandbar shark (C. plumbeus) and the bignose shark (C. altimus), while the silky shark is the basal member of the other branch and the sister taxon to a clade containing the Caribbean reef shark (C. perezi), Galapagos shark (C. galapagensis), oceanic whitetip shark (C. longimanus), dusky shark (C. obscurus), and blue shark (Prionace glauca). Mine Dosay-Abkulut's 2008 ribosomal DNA analysis, which included the silky, blue, and bignose sharks, confirmed the closeness of those three species.

== Distribution and habitat ==
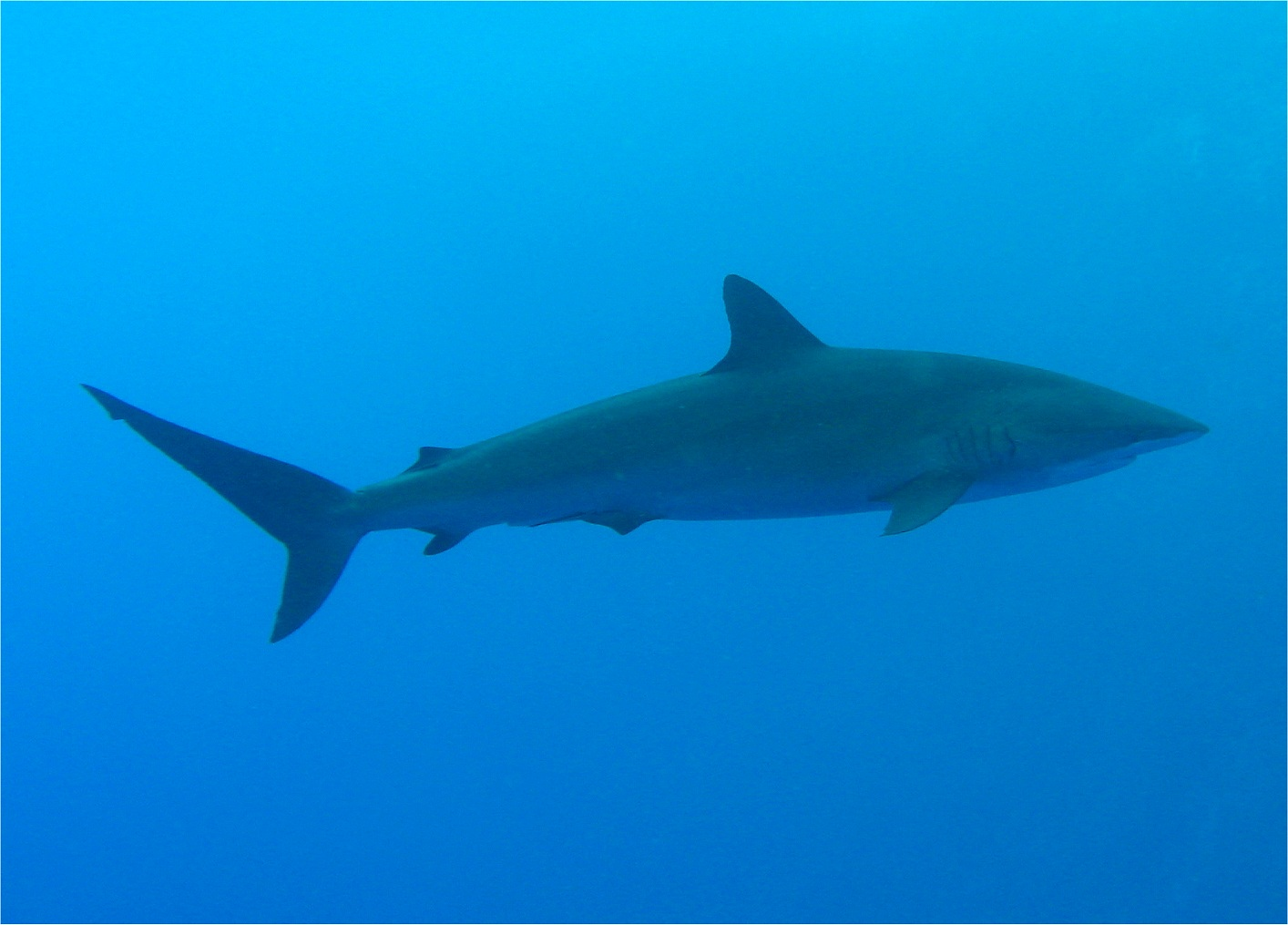
The silky shark is typically encountered in open water.

The silky shark has a cosmopolitan distribution in marine waters warmer than 23 °C (73 °F). In the Atlantic Ocean, it is found from Massachusetts (USA) to Spain in the north, and from southern Brazil to northern Angola in the south, including the Gulf of Mexico and the Caribbean Sea. In the Mediterranean Sea, it has been recorded first in the Alboran Sea, subsequently in Algerian waters, the Gulf of Gabes (Tunisia) and more recently in the Ligurian Sea. It occurs throughout the Indian Ocean, as far south as Mozambique in the west and Western Australia in the east, including the Red Sea and the Persian Gulf. In the Pacific Ocean, the northern extent of its range runs from southern China and Japan to southern Baja California and the Gulf of California, while the southern extent runs from Sydney, Australia, to northern New Zealand to northern Chile. Based on life history differences, four distinct populations of silky sharks have been identified in ocean basins worldwide: in the northwestern Atlantic, in the western and central Pacific, in the eastern Pacific, and in the Indian Ocean.

Primarily an inhabitant of the open ocean, the silky shark is most common from the surface to a depth of 200 m (660 ft), but may dive to 500 m (1,600 ft) or more. Tracking studies in the tropical eastern Pacific and northern Gulf of Mexico have found that cruising silky sharks spend 99% of their time within 50 m (160 ft) of the surface, and 80–85% of their time in water with a temperature of 26–30 °C (79–86 °F); the pattern was constant regardless of day or night. This species favors the edges of continental and insular shelves, often over deepwater reefs and around islands. Its range extends farther north and south along continental margins than in oceanic waters. On occasion, it may venture into coastal waters as shallow as 18 m (59 ft). Silky sharks are highly mobile and migratory, though the details of their movements are little-known. Tagging data have recorded individual sharks moving up to 60 km (37 mi) per day, and covering distances up to 1,339 km (832 mi). Larger sharks generally move longer distances than smaller ones. In the Pacific Ocean and possibly elsewhere, it spends the summer at slightly higher latitudes, particularly during warmer El Niño years. In the northern Atlantic, most sharks follow the Gulf Stream northward along the U.S. East Coast. In the Gulf of Aden, it is most common in late spring and summer.

== Description ==
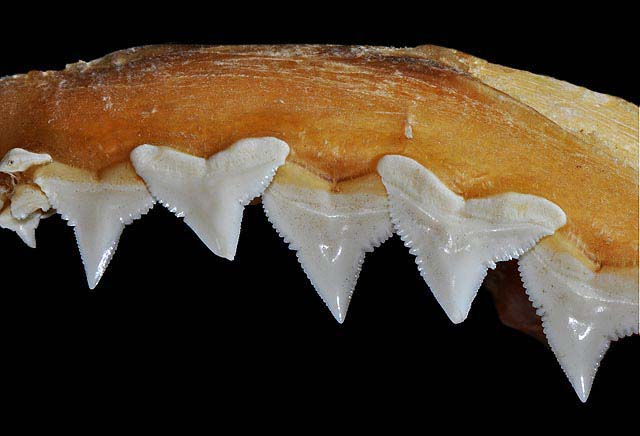
Upper teeth

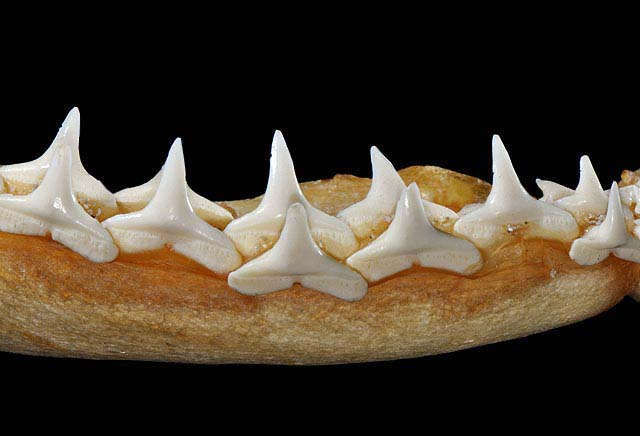
Lower teeth

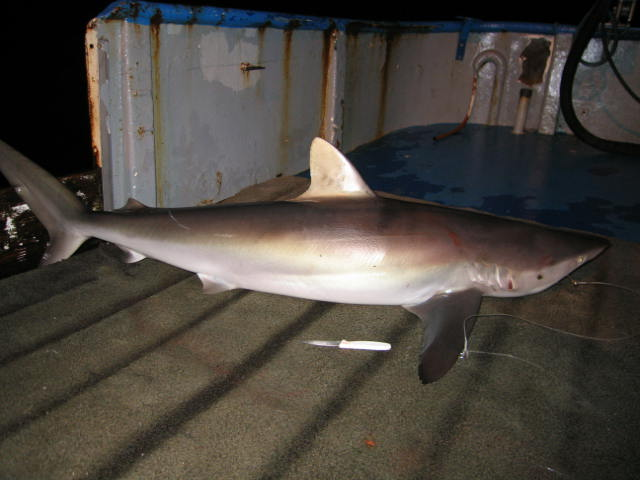

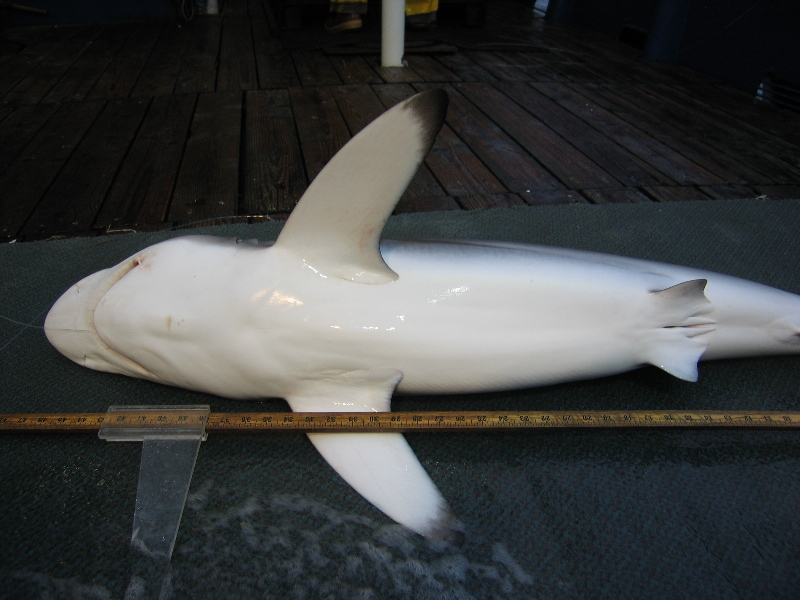
Distinctive features of the silky shark include its small first dorsal fin and large pectoral fins.

Slim and streamlined, the silky shark has a fairly long, rounded snout with barely developed flaps of skin in front of the nostrils. The circular, medium-sized eyes are equipped with nictitating membranes (protective third eyelids). Short, shallow furrows are present at the corners of the mouth. 14–16 and 13–17 tooth rows are found on either side of the upper and lower jaws, respectively (typically 15 for both). The upper teeth are triangular and strongly serrated, with a notch in the posterior edge; they are erect at the center and become more oblique towards the sides. The lower teeth are narrow, erect, and smooth-edged. The five pairs of gill slits are moderate in length.

The dorsal and pectoral fins are distinctive and help to distinguish the silky shark from similar species. The first dorsal fin is relatively small, measuring less than a tenth as high as the shark is long, and originates behind the free rear tips of the pectoral fins. It has a rounded apex, an S-shaped rear margin, and a free rear tip about half as long as the fin is tall. The second dorsal fin is tiny, smaller than the anal fin, with a drawn-out free rear tip up to three times as long as the fin is tall. A narrow dorsal ridge runs between the dorsal fins. The pectoral fins are narrow and sickle-shaped, and particularly long in adults. The anal fin originates slightly ahead of the second dorsal fin and has a deep notch in the posterior margin. The caudal fin is fairly high with a well-developed lower lobe.

The skin is densely covered by minute, overlapping dermal denticles. Each dermal denticle is diamond-shaped and bears horizontal ridges leading to posterior marginal teeth, which increase in number as the shark grows. The back is metallic golden-brown to dark gray and the belly is snowy white, which extends onto the flank as a faint lighter stripe. The fins (except for the first dorsal) darken at the tips; this is more obvious in young sharks. The coloration quickly fades to a dull gray after death. One of the largest members of its genus, the silky shark commonly reaches a length of 2.5 m (8.2 ft), with a maximum recorded length and weight of 3.5 m (11 ft) and 346 kg (763 lb), respectively. Females grow larger than males.

== Biology and ecology ==
The silky shark is one of the three most common pelagic sharks along with the blue and oceanic whitetip sharks, and counts among the most numerous large oceanic animals in the world with a population of at least tens of millions. Compared to the other two species, it is less strictly pelagic with the greatest numbers found in offshore waters associated with land, where food is more readily obtained than farther out in the truly open ocean. The silky shark is an active, inquisitive, and aggressive predator, though it will defer to the slower but more powerful oceanic whitetip shark in competitive situations. When approaching something of interest, it may seem inattentive, sedately circling and sometimes swinging its head from side to side. However, it can respond with startling swiftness to any shift in its immediate surroundings. This shark is often found around floating objects such as logs or tethered naval buoys.

Younger silky sharks are known to form large, loosely organized aggregations, possibly for mutual defense. During migrations, over a thousand individuals may gather. These groups are generally segregated by size, and in the Pacific perhaps also by sex. Silky sharks within a group have been observed to "tilt", presenting their full lateral profile towards each other, as well as gape their jaws or puff out their gills. On occasion, sharks have also been seen suddenly charging straight up, veering away just before reaching the surface and gliding back down to deeper water. The significance of these behaviors is unknown. When confronted, the silky shark may perform a threat display, in which it arches its back, drops its tail and pectoral fins, and elevates its head. The shark then proceeds to swim in tight loops with a stiff, jerky motion, often turning broadside towards the perceived threat.

Potential predators of the silky shark include larger sharks and killer whales (Orcinus orca). Known parasites of this shark include the isopod Gnathia trimaculata, the copepod Kroeyerina cortezensis, and the tapeworms Dasyrhynchus variouncinatus and Phyllobothrium sp. Silky sharks frequently intermingle with schools of scalloped hammerheads (Sphyrna lewini), and have been known to follow marine mammals. One account from the Red Sea describes 25 silky sharks following a large pod of bottlenose dolphins (Tursiops sp.), along with 25 grey reef sharks (C. amblyrhynchos) and a lone silvertip shark (C. albimarginatus). Silky sharks are themselves accompanied by juvenile pilot fish (Naucrates ductor), which "ride" the pressure wave ahead of the shark, as well as by jacks, which snatch scraps of food and rub against the shark's skin to scrape off parasites.

=== Feeding ===
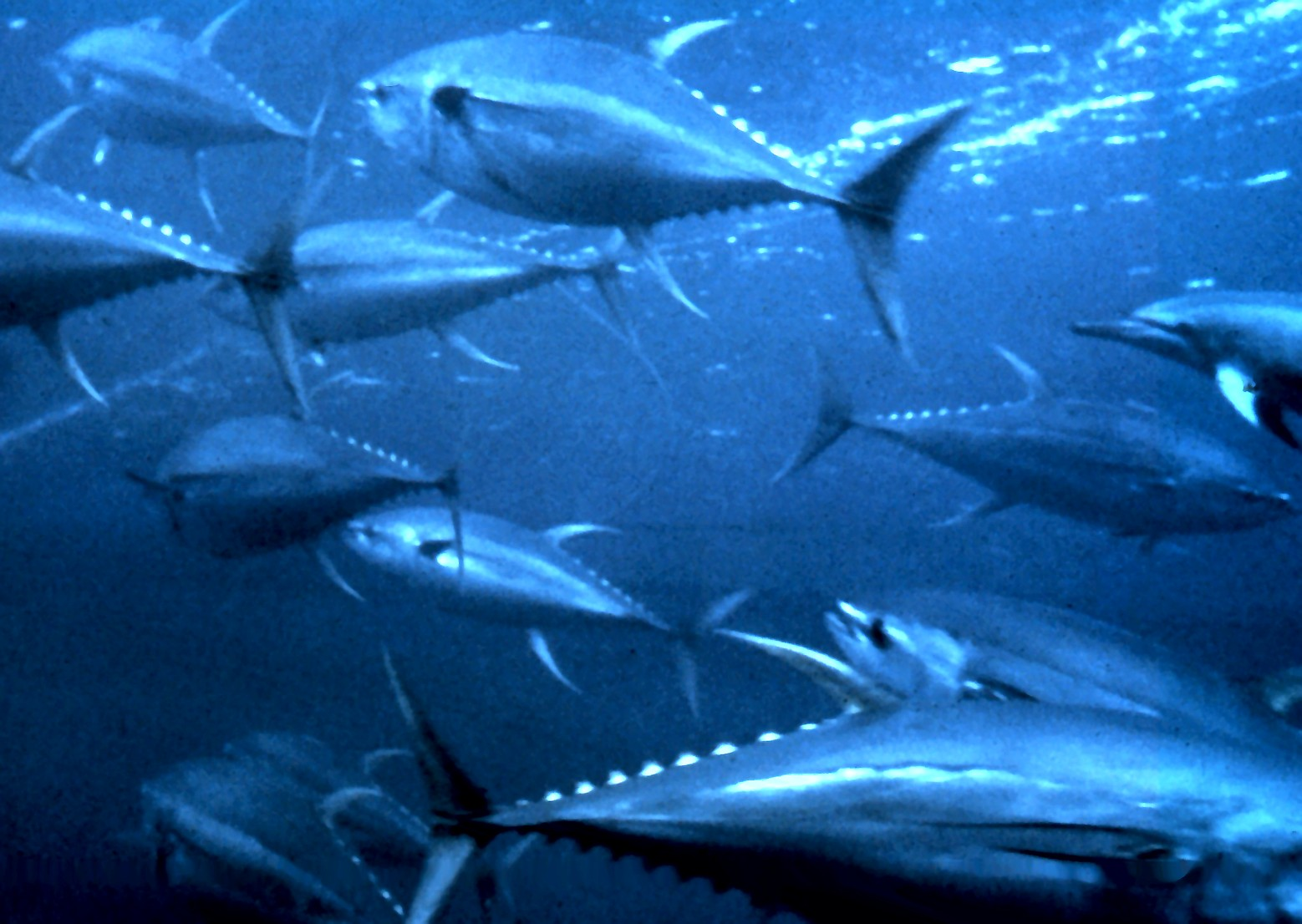
Tuna are a favored prey of the silky shark, which is often found trailing their schools.

The silky shark is an opportunistic predator, feeding mainly on bony fishes from all levels of the water column, including tuna, mackerel, sardines, mullets, groupers, snappers, mackerel scads, sea chubs, sea catfish, eels, lanternfishes, filefishes, triggerfishes, and porcupinefishes. It may also take squid, paper nautilus, and swimming crabs, and fossil evidence indicates it scavenged on whale carcasses. Good feeding opportunities can draw silky sharks in large numbers; one such feeding aggregation in the Pacific has been documented "herding" a school of small fishes into a compact mass (a bait ball) and trapping it against the surface, whereupon the sharks consumed the entire school. When attacking tightly packed fish, silky sharks charge through the ball and slash open-mouthed, catching the prey fish at the corners of their jaws. Although multiple individuals may feed at once, each launches its attack independently.

Studies conducted off the Florida coast and the Bahamas have shown that silky sharks are highly sensitive to sound, in particular low-frequency (10–20 Hz), irregular pulses. Experiments in which these sounds were played underwater attracted sharks from hundreds of meters away. Silky sharks likely orient to these sounds because they are similar to the noise generated by feeding animals such as birds or dolphins, thus indicating promising sources of food. These studies have also demonstrated that a silky shark attracted by one sound will quickly withdraw if that sound abruptly changes in amplitude or character; this change need not be a sound produced by a predator to evoke the reaction. Over repeated exposures, silky sharks habituate to the sound change and stop withdrawing, though it takes them much longer to do so compared to the bolder oceanic whitetip shark.

The bite force of a 2-m-long silky shark has been measured at 890 newtons (200 lbf). A well-established association exists between this species and tuna: off Ghana, almost every tuna school has silky sharks trailing behind, and in the eastern Pacific, these sharks inflict such damage to tuna fishing gear and catches that fishery workers have given them the moniker "net-eating sharks". Silky sharks and bottlenose dolphins compete when both species target the same school of fish; the amount eaten by the dolphins decreases relative to the number of sharks present. If a large number of sharks is present, they tend to remain inside the prey school, while the dolphins consign themselves to the periphery, possibly to avoid incidental injury from the sharks' slashing attacks. Conversely, if a large enough group of dolphins gathers, they become able to chase the sharks away from the prey school. Regardless of which one dominates, the two predators do not engage in any overtly aggressive behavior against each other.

=== Life history ===
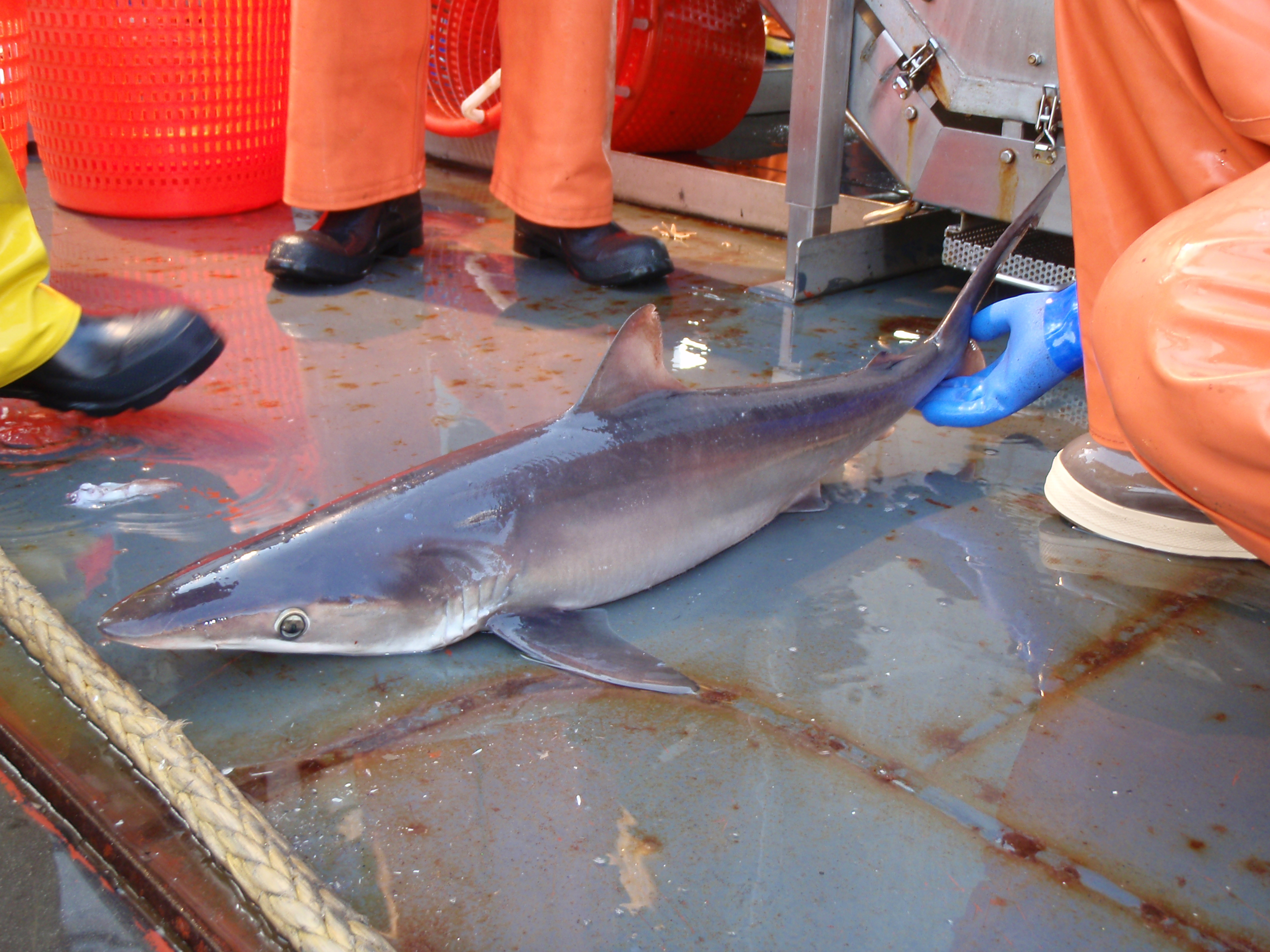
A juvenile silky shark – this species gives birth to live, fully formed young.

Like other members of its family, the silky shark is viviparous: once the developing embryo exhausts its supply of yolk, the depleted yolk sac is converted into a placental connection through which the mother delivers nourishment. Relative to other viviparous sharks, the placenta of the silky shark is less similar to the analogous mammalian structure in that no interdigitation exists between the tissues of the fetus and mother. Furthermore, the fetal red blood cells are much smaller than maternal blood cells, which is opposite the pattern seen in mammals. Adult females have a single functional ovary (on the right side) and two functional uteri, which are divided lengthwise into separate compartments for each embryo.

Silky sharks in most parts of the world are thought to reproduce year-round, whereas mating and birthing in the Gulf of Mexico take place in late spring or early summer (May to August). However, in some cases, the presence of reproductive seasonality may have been obscured by biases in data collection. Females give birth after a gestation period of 12 months, either every year or every other year. The litter size ranges from one to 16 and increases with female size, with six to 12 being typical. The pups are born in reef nursery areas on the outer continental shelf, where ample food supplies and protection from large pelagic sharks occur. The risk of predation has selected for fast growth in young sharks, which add 25–30 cm (9.8–11.8 in) to their length within their first year of life. After a few months (or by the first winter in the Gulf of Mexico), the now-subadult sharks migrate out from the nursery into the open ocean.

Life history parameters of the silky shark
| Region | Length at birth | Male length at maturity | Female length at maturity |
|---|---|---|---|
| Northwestern Atlantic | 68–84 cm (27–33 in) | 2.15–2.25 m (7.1–7.4 ft) | 2.32–2.46 m (7.6–8.1 ft) |
| Eastern Atlantic | ? | 2.20 m (7.2 ft) | 2.38–2.50 m (7.8–8.2 ft) |
| Indian | 56–87 cm (22–34 in) | 2.39–2.40 m (7.8–7.9 ft) | 2.16–2.60 m (7.1–8.5 ft) |
| Western Pacific | ? | 2.10–2.14 m (6.9–7.0 ft) | 2.02–2.20 m (6.6–7.2 ft) |
| Central Pacific | 65–81 cm (26–32 in) | 1.86 m (6.1 ft) | 2.00–2.18 m (6.56–7.15 ft) |
| Eastern Pacific | 70 cm (28 in) | 1.80–1.82 m (5.9–6.0 ft) | 1.80–1.82 m (5.9–6.0 ft) |

The life history characteristics of the silky shark differ across its range (see table). Northwestern Atlantic sharks tend to be larger than those in the western-central Pacific at all ages, while eastern Pacific sharks tend to be smaller than sharks in other regions. Eastern Atlantic and Indian Ocean sharks seem to match or exceed the size of northwestern Atlantic sharks, but the figures are based on relatively few individuals and more data are needed.

The overall growth rate of the silky shark is moderate compared to other shark species and similar for both sexes, though it varies significantly between individuals. One central Pacific study has found females growing much slower than males, but the results may have been skewed by missing data from large females. The highest reported growth rates are from sharks in the northern Gulf of Mexico, and the lowest from sharks off northeastern Taiwan. Males and females reach sexual maturity at ages of 6–10 years and 7–12+ years, respectively. Sharks from more temperate waters may grow slower and mature later than those in warmer regions. The maximum lifespan is at least 22 years.

== Human interactions ==
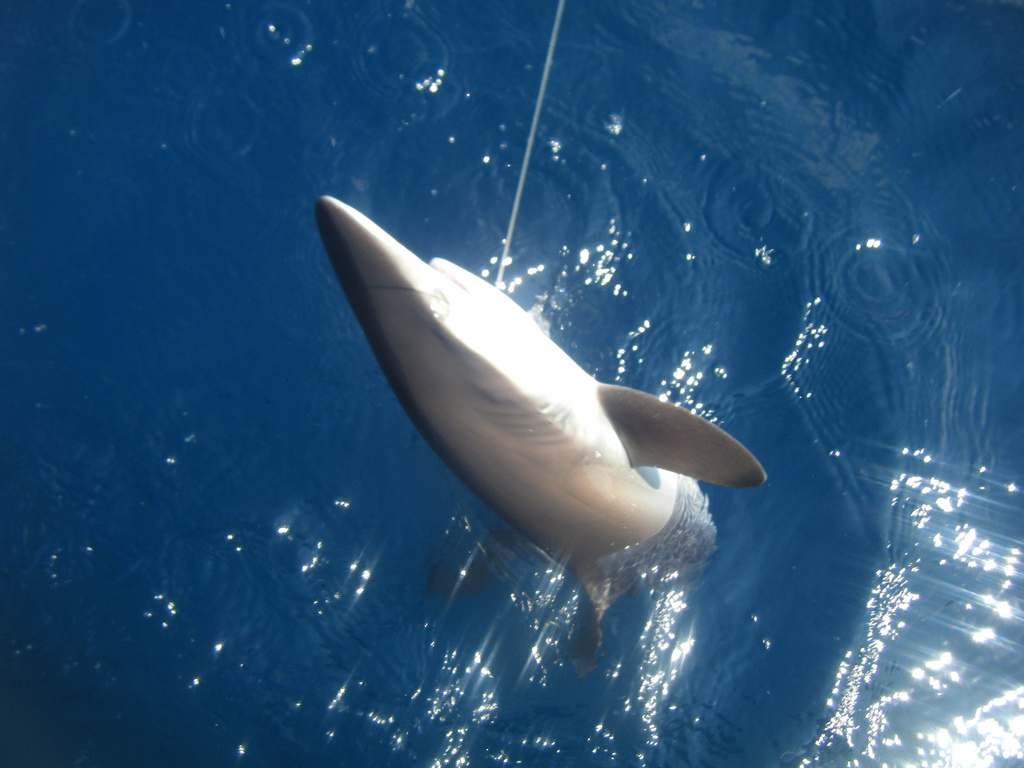
A silky shark caught by a sport angler – this shark is heavily fished in many regions.

Given its formidable size and dentition, the silky shark is regarded as potentially dangerous to humans. However, it only rarely comes into contact with people due to its oceanic habits. Its natural curiosity and boldness may lead it to repeatedly and closely approach divers, and it can become dangerously excited in the presence of food. The silky shark tends to be more aggressive if encountered on a reef than in open water. Cases of individual sharks persistently harassing divers and even forcing them out of the water have been reported. As of May 2009, the International Shark Attack File lists six attacks attributable to the silky shark, three of them unprovoked and none fatal.

Large numbers of silky sharks are caught by commercial and artisanal multispecies shark fisheries operating off Mexico, Guatemala, El Salvador, Costa Rica, the United States, Ecuador, Spain, Portugal, Sri Lanka, the Maldives, Yemen, and Côte d'Ivoire. Even greater numbers are caught incidentally by tuna longline and purse seine fisheries throughout its range, particularly those using fish aggregating devices. It is the most common shark caught as bycatch in the eastern Pacific and Gulf of Mexico tuna fisheries, and the second-most common shark caught as bycatch (next to the blue shark) overall. The fins are valued as an ingredient in shark fin soup, with captured sharks often finned at sea and the rest of the body discarded. Fins from an estimated one-half to one and a half million silky sharks are traded globally per year; it is the second- or third-most common species auctioned on the Hong Kong fin market, which represents over half the global trade. The meat (sold fresh or dried and salted), skin, and liver oil may also be used, as well as the jaws: this species is the predominant source of dried shark jaw curios sold to tourists in the tropics. Some sport fishers catch silky sharks.

=== Conservation ===
As one of the most abundant and widely distributed sharks on Earth, the silky shark was once thought to be mostly immune to depletion despite heavy fishing mortality. In 1989 alone, some 900,000 individuals were taken as bycatch in the southern and central Pacific tuna longline fishery, seemingly without effect on the total population. Fishery data on this shark are often confounded by under-reporting, lack of species-level separation, and problematic identification. Nevertheless, mounting evidence indicates the silky shark has, in fact, declined substantially worldwide, a consequence of its modest reproductive rate which is unable to sustain such high levels of exploitation. The total annual catch reported to the Food and Agriculture Organization fell steadily from 11,680 tons in 2000 to 4,358 tons in 2004. Regional assessments have found similar trends, estimating declines of some 90% in the central Pacific from the 1950s to the 1990s, 60% off Costa Rica from 1991 to 2000, 91% in the Gulf of Mexico from the 1950s to the 1990s, and 85% (for all large requiem sharks) in the northwestern Atlantic from 1986 to 2005. The silky shark fishery off Sri Lanka reported a drop from a peak catch of 25,400 tons in 1994 to only 1,960 tons in 2006, indicative of a local stock collapse. However, Japanese fisheries in the Pacific and Indian Oceans have recorded no change in catch rate between the 1970s and the 1990s, and the validity of the methodologies used to assess declines in the Gulf of Mexico and the northwestern Atlantic have come under much debate.

As of 2017, the silky shark is classified by the International Union for Conservation of Nature as a vulnerable species. The silky shark is listed on Annex I, Highly Migratory Species, of the United Nations Convention on the Law of the Sea, though this has yet to result in any management schemes. The species should benefit from bans on shark finning, which are being increasingly implemented by nations and supranational entities, including the United States, Australia, and the European Union. Organizations such as the International Commission for the Conservation of Atlantic Tunas and the Inter-American Tropical Tuna Commission have also taken steps to improve fishery monitoring, with the ultimate goal of reducing shark bycatch. However, given the highly migratory nature of the silky shark and its association with tuna, no simple way is known to reduce bycatch without also affecting the economics of the fishery.
