= Hassall–Henle bodies =

Eye growths associated with aging

Hassall–Henle bodies are small transparent growths on the posterior surface of Descemet's membrane at the periphery of the cornea. These bodies contain collagenous matter in which numerous cracks and fissures are filled with extrusions of the corneal endothelium. The condition is usually associated with the aging process.

Hassall–Henle bodies are named after British physician Arthur Hill Hassall (1817–1894) and German anatomist Friedrich Gustav Jakob Henle (1809–1885). They are sometimes referred to as Hassall–Henle warts or Henle's warts.
