= Bukangi =

Individual dusky shark in South Korea

- Bukangi in late September 2026
- Species: Dusky shark (Carcharhinus obscurus)
- Sex: Female
- Title: Honorary ambassador of Busan
- Named after: Name of the park where she was found
- Length: 300 cm (9 ft 10 in)

Bukangi (Korean: 부캉이) is a dusky shark discovered in the canal of North Port Waterfront Park (북항친수공원; Bukhang chinsu gongwon) in Dong District, Busan, South Korea on September 18, 2026. She left the canal on October 22, 2026 on her own after three unsuccessful rescue attempts. She was appointed as an honorary ambassador of Busan due to her nationwide popularity.

== Discovery and rescue efforts ==
North Port Waterfront Park

On October 6, NIFS identified Bukangi as a dusky shark from the ridge between its dorsal fins.

As ocean temperatures rise, sharks' prey are moving farther north, making sharks move accordingly. Bukangi, a 3-meter (9.8 ft) female dusky shark over 20 years old, is believed to have entered the canal in pursuit of prey and was unable to escape. She was first reported in the park on September 18, 2026, at around 8:57 a.m. KST. The Korea Coast Guard deployed rescue boats and patrol vessels, and Busan City sent out safety messages to nearby residents. However, following the National Institute of Fisheries Science's advice to allow the shark to return to the sea on its own, the coast guard did not attempt a forced release at the time. The shark began to be called Bukangi after the park's name on social media.

The canal is 1.5 km (0.93 mi) long and 30–60 m (33–66 yd) wide, with a depth of 2.5 m (8 ft) at low tide and 4 m (13 ft) at high tide. Experts recommended the rescue of Bukangi as prolonged confinement in the narrow canal, which differs greatly from her natural habitat, could negatively affect her health. Also, the canal is shallow, so its water temperature could drop rapidly. From 11 a.m. to 12:40 p.m. on September 29, rescue boats sprayed water behind Bukangi to create foam and noise and thus guide her toward the northern exit of the canal, but she did not move in that direction. An additional rescue attempt took place for about an hour starting at 2:30 p.m., but it ultimately failed.

The second rescue attempt began at 4 p.m. on October 2. Five people were positioned on each side of the canal to pull a 50 m (164 ft) long and 6.8 m (22 ft) wide net towards the northern exit while two coast guard vessels pulled the center of the net to spread it out evenly in the canal. However, difficulties in deploying the net led the vessels to withdraw at around 5:40 p.m. Busan City installed the net 70 m (77 yd) from the canal’s exit to prevent Bukangi from entering the waterway. However, during high tide on October 3, she crossed over the net and re-entered the canal. Busan City later removed the net and announced that it had no additional rescue plans for the time being.

As falling water temperature could pose a health risk to Bukangi, the Ministry of Oceans and Fisheries, National Marine Biodiversity Institute of Korea, and Busan City launched a third rescue operation at 9:30 a.m. on October 21. Divers lowered a 70 m (230 ft)-wide net attached to a pontoon to the bottom of the waterway and used it to push Bukangi toward the southern exit. To prevent her from re-entering the canal, the rescue team installed three layers of nets 60 m (66 yd) from the exit. Bukangi was spotted outside the canal around 6 p.m., indicating that the 8-hour operation was successful. However, at 11:05 p.m., she crossed over the first net and was found between the first and second nets the next morning. The reason for her return is thought to be difficulty in withstanding the strong currents in open waters after more than a month of inadequate feeding, or vibrations generated by ships near North Port.

On October 22, the Ministry of Oceans and Fisheries removed the first net to allow Bukangi to return to the open sea on her own. She disappeared after an oil spill in nearby waters on October 23, and was spotted near Busan Port Passenger Terminal on October 24.

== Popularity and influence ==
People watching Bukangi at North Port Waterfront Park

Bukangi is credited with making North Port Waterfront Park a nationwide attraction. While the park previously had two thousand visitors per day, 1,678,800 people visited the park from September 18 to October 21 to see the shark. Thus, nearby cafes and convenience stores saw increased revenue. Also, sales of shark-shaped ice cream bars at convenience stores near the park surged by 30% and the stock prices of Pinkfong, known for the song "Baby Shark", rose by more than 7% at one point.

On September 29, Busan City appointed Bukangi as an honorary ambassador after a poll with 91% in favor of the decision. Chun Jae-soo, mayor of Busan, described her as a "new part of Busan's story". On October 26, Busan City distributed free Bukangi stickers.

On October 12, 2026, Bukangi was mentioned in the parliamentary audit of the Ministry of Oceans and Fisheries where lawmakers discussed rising water temperatures and appropriate countermeasures.
