= Crypts of Henle =

Crypts of Henle are microscopic pockets found in scattered sections of the conjunctiva around the eyeball. They are responsible for secreting mucin, a proteinous substance that makes up the inner layer of tears. It coats the cornea to provide a hydrophilic layer that allows for even distribution of the tear film. The layer of mucin allows tears to glide evenly across the eye's surface. The crypts of Henle are named after German anatomist Friedrich Gustav Jakob Henle (1809–1885).

Another anatomical structure called the glands of Manz perform a similar function. They are located in the eyeball's conjunctiva, arranged in a ring around the cornea, near the scleral junction. They also are responsible for secreting mucin into tears.
