= Arthur Hill Hassall =

British public health physician

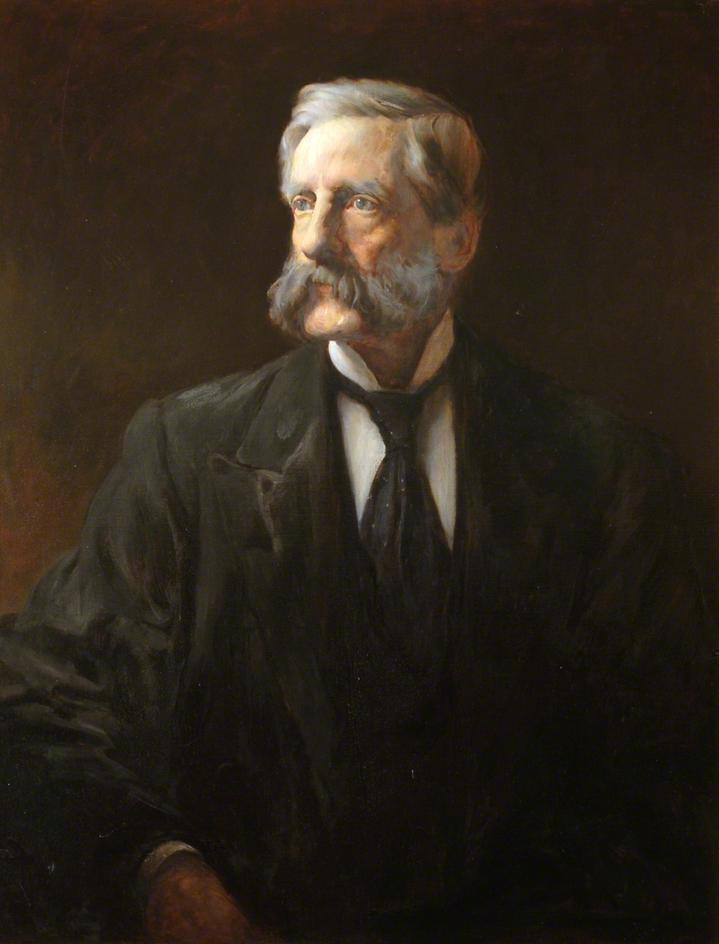
Arthur Hill Hassall (circa 1868)

Arthur Hill Hassall (13 December 1817, Teddington – 9 April 1894, San Remo) was a British physician, chemist and microscopist who is primarily known for his work in public health and food safety.

== Biography ==
Hassall was born in Middlesex as the youngest son of five children in a house of a surgeon. His father was Thomas Hassall (1771–1844) and his mother, née Ann Sherrock (c. 1778–1817). He spent his school years in Richmond. He entered medicine through apprenticeship in 1834 to his uncle Sir James Murray (1788–1871), spending his early career in Dublin, where he also studied botany and the seashore. In 1846 he published a two-volume study, The Microscopic Anatomy of the Human Body in Health and Disease, the first English textbook on the subject.

After further studying botany at Kew and publishing on botanical topics, particularly freshwater algae, he came to public attention with his 1850 book A microscopical examination of the water supplied to the inhabitants of London and the suburban districts, which became an influential work in promoting the cause of water reform. In the early 1850s he also studied food adulteration; his reports were published in The Lancet by reformer Thomas Wakley and led directly to the 1860 Food Adulteration Act and subsequent further legislation against the practice.

He also worked as physician at the Royal Free Hospital, but required long breaks through ill-health due to pulmonary tuberculosis, and in 1869 moved to the Isle of Wight. On the basis of his experience of the microclimate of the Undercliff, he established the National Cottage Hospital for Consumption and Diseases of the Chest (later Royal National Hospital for Diseases of the Chest), a sanatorium at Ventnor, Isle of Wight. The buildings were designed by local architect Thomas Hellyer.

From 1878 onward, aiming to rest in warmer climates, he spent most of his time in Europe, gaining permission to practise both in San Remo, where he and his family lived, and Lucerne, where he worked in the summer. During this time he wrote extensively on climatic treatments for tuberculosis, works such as the 1879 San Remo and the Western Riviera Climatically and Medically Considered. His autobiography, The narrative of a busy life, was published in 1893.

Two medical terms are named after Hassall: Hassall's corpuscles, which are spherical bodies in the medulla of the thymus gland, and Hassall–Henle bodies, which are abnormal growths in the Descemet membrane of the eye.

His Ventnor hospital operated until 1964 when it closed, made obsolete by drug treatment of tuberculosis, to be demolished in 1969. Its grounds are now the site of Ventnor Botanic Garden.

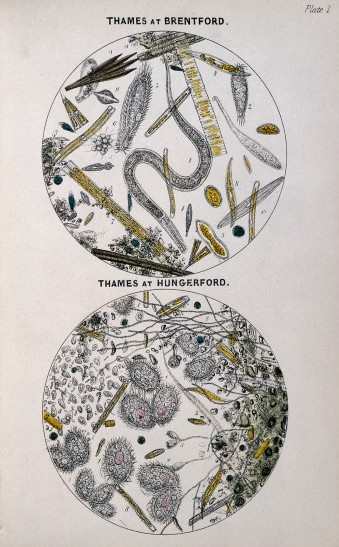
An illustration from A. Hassall's book "A microscopic examination of the water supplied to the inhabitants of London and the suburban districts." 1850

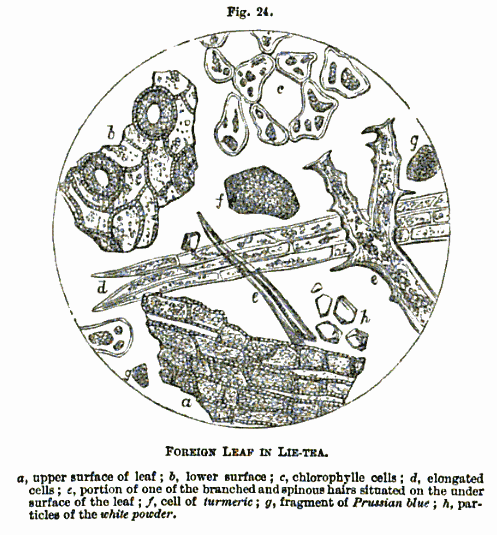
Illustration by Hassall depicting fake-tea in "Food: its adulterations, and the methods for their detection." 1876

== Family relations of A. H. Hassall ==
Hassall's paternal grandfather was a physician who practised in Sunderland and fathered numerous sons and daughter. By the marriages of his grandfather's children, Arthur Hill Hassall was connected to the prominent Sanderson, Coppin, and Straker families in the North of England. John Burdon-Sanderson was a member of this Sanderson family. John Coppin Straker (1847–1937), Deputy Lieutenant of Northumberland, was a member of the Coppin and Straker families. A. H. Hassall had two brothers and two sisters. One brother went to sea and died young (perhaps as the victim of foul play). The other brother, Richard, became a physician.

== Publications ==
- The Microscopic Anatomy of the Human Body in Health and Disease. S. Highley, London 1846
- A microscopical examination of the water supplied to the inhabitants of London and the suburban districts. S. Highley, London 1850
- San Remo and the Western Riviera Climatically and Medically Considered. Longmans, Green, and Co., London 1883
- A compendium of food-microscopy with sections on drugs, water, and tobacco. Baillière, Tindall and Cox, London 1909
- A history of the British freshwater Algae, including descriptions of the. Desmidiaceae and Diatomaceae. pp. vi, 462. Atlas, 103 ph. col 8. London, 1845.
- Adulterations detected; or, Plain instructions for the discovery of frauds in food and medicine. Longman, Brown, Green, Longmans, and Roberts, London 1857.
- The urine in health and disease: being an exposition of the composition of the urine, and of the pathology and treatment of urinary and renal disorders. John Churchill and Sons, London 1863
- Food: its adulterations, and the methods for their detection. Longman, Brown, Green, and Longmans, London 1855
- The inhalation treatment of diseases of the organs of respiration including consumption. Longmans, Green, and Co., London 1885
- The Narrative Of A Busy Life: An Autobiography. Longmans, Green, and Co., London 1893
