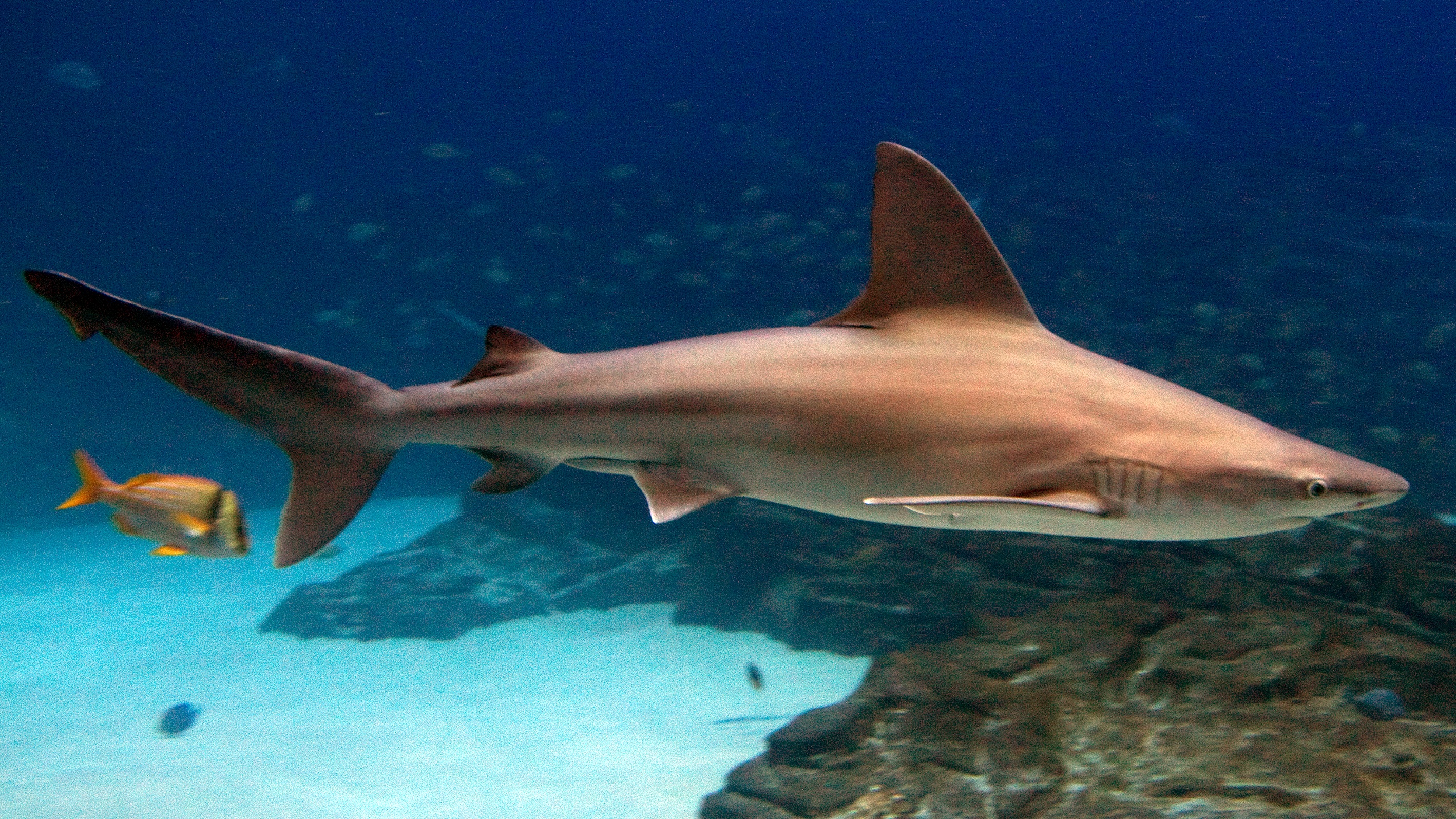
- At the Georgia Aquarium

Conservation status
- Endangered (IUCN 3.1)

Scientific classification
- Kingdom: Animalia
- Phylum: Chordata
- Class: Chondrichthyes
- Subclass: Elasmobranchii
- Division: Selachii
- Order: Carcharhiniformes
- Family: Carcharhinidae
- Genus: Carcharhinus
- Species: C. plumbeus

Binomial name
- Carcharhinus plumbeus (Nardo, 1827)
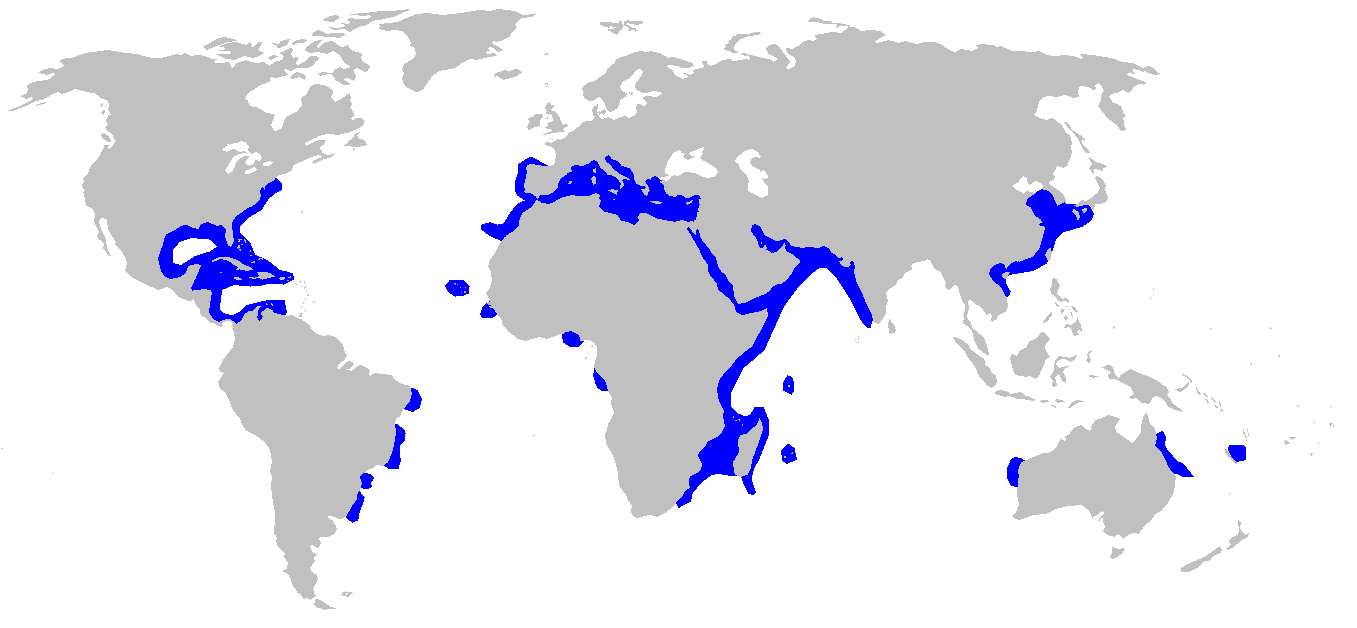
- Range of the sandbar shark

= Sandbar shark =

Sandbar shark Temporal range: Early Miocene to present

Species of shark

The sandbar shark (Carcharhinus plumbeus), also known as the brown shark or thickskin shark, is a species of requiem shark, and part of the family Carcharhinidae, native to the Atlantic Ocean and the Indo-Pacific. It is distinguishable by its very high first dorsal fin and interdorsal ridge. It is not to be confused with the similarly named sand tiger shark, or Carcharias taurus.

== Evolution ==
The earliest fossil teeth of this species are known from the Early Miocene of Italy. They appear on the eastern coast of the US around the Middle Miocene, and in Venezuela around the same time. Fossils become more geographically widespread afterwards.

== Description and growth ==
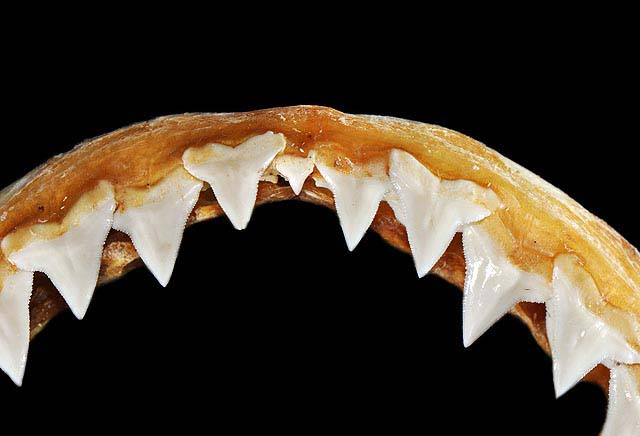
Upper teeth

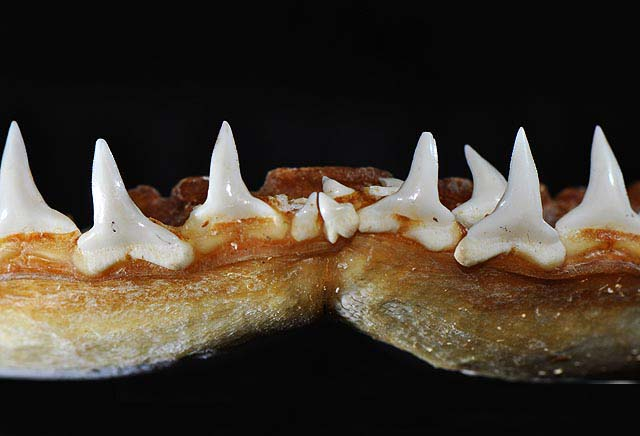
Lower teeth

The sandbar shark is one of the largest coastal sharks in the world, and is closely related to the dusky shark, the bignose shark, and the bull shark. Its dorsal fin is triangular and very high, and it has very long pectoral fins. Sandbar sharks usually have heavy-set bodies and rounded snouts that are shorter than the average shark's snout. Its upper teeth have broadly uneven cusps with sharp edges. Its second dorsal fin and anal fin are close to the same height.

Females can grow to 2–2.5 m (6.6–8.2 ft), males up to 1.8 m (5.9 ft). The maximum recorded weight is 240 kg (530 lb). Female sandbar sharks have an average fork-length (tip of the nose to fork in the tail) of 154.9 cm with the males' average fork-length being 151.6 cm. Its body color can vary from a blue-ish brown, grey or bronze, with a white or pale underside. Sandbar sharks swim alone or gather in sex-segregated schools that vary in size.

== Distribution and habitat ==
The sandbar shark, true to its nickname, is commonly found over muddy or sandy bottoms in shallow coastal waters such as bays, estuaries, harbors, or the mouths of rivers, but it also swims in deeper waters (200 m or more) as well as intertidal zones. Sandbar sharks are found in tropical to temperate waters worldwide; in the western Atlantic they range from Massachusetts to Brazil. Juveniles are common to abundant in the lower Chesapeake Bay, and nursery grounds are found from Delaware Bay to South Carolina. Other nursery grounds include Bonjuk Bay in Marmaris, Muğla/Turkey and the Florida Keys.

== Predators and diet ==
Natural predators of the sandbar shark include the tiger shark and, rarely, great white sharks.

The sandbar shark itself preys on fish, rays, crabs, and molluscs. They have also been found to primarily consume osteichthyes, or bony fish, octopuses, european squid, and cuttlefish when in areas such as the Mediterranean or the Gulf of Gabés. Sandbar sharks have been described as being a top predator in their ecosystem's food chain.

== Maturity and reproduction ==
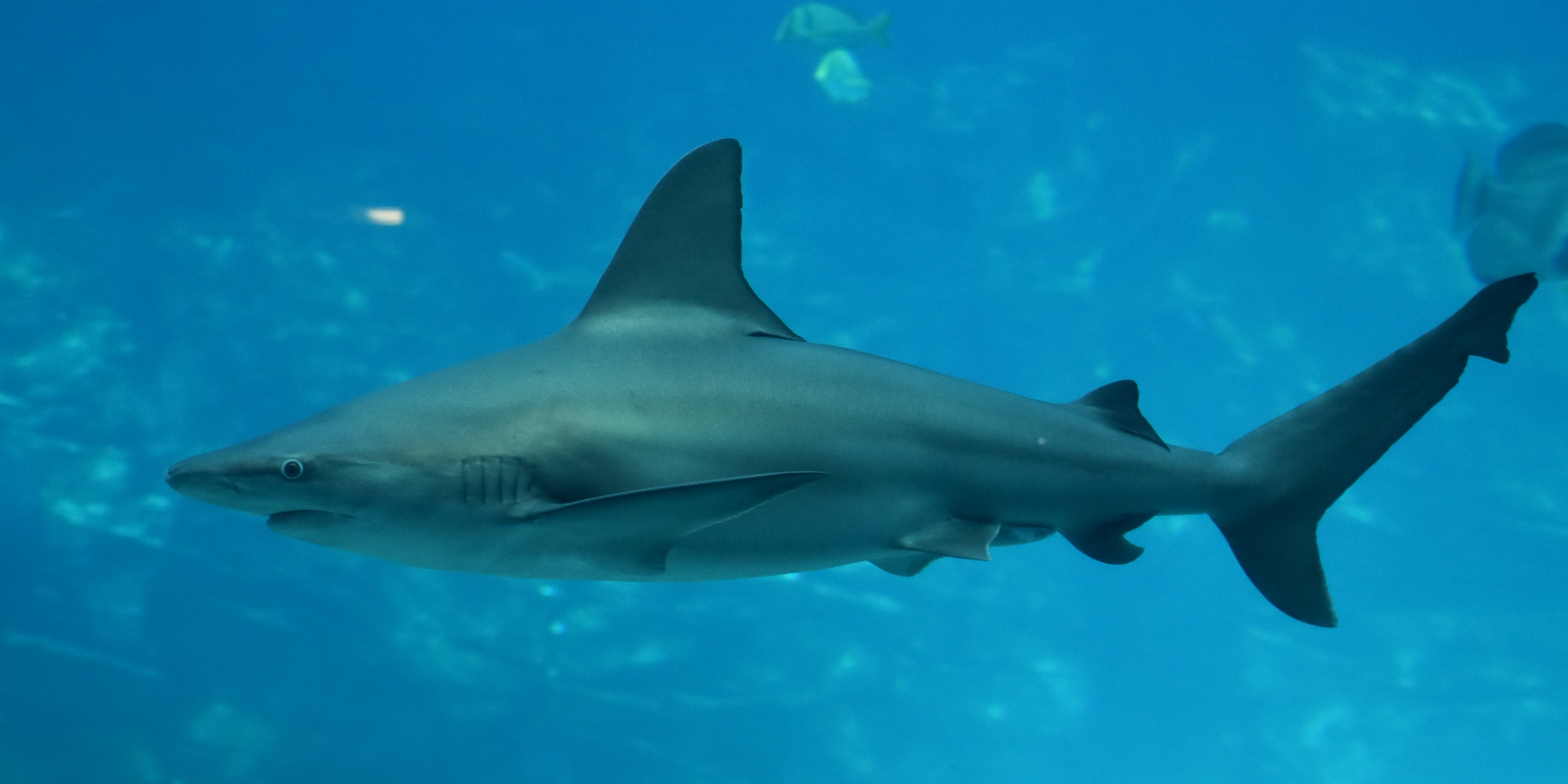
At the Georgia Aquarium

There are disagreements about when exactly sandbar sharks reach sexual maturity, but most studies conclude that females reach sexual maturity around 13 years of age, while males tend to reach maturity around age 12 years old. Sandbar sharks are viviparous, with the embryos supported in placental yolk sac inside the mother. Females have been found to exhibit both biennial, consistently reproducing every two years and returning to the same place to have deliver the pup, and triennial, reproducing every three years and returning to the same place for delivery, migration and gestation periods. They also ovulate in early summer, and give birth to an average of eight pups, which they carry for 1 year before giving birth. The longevity of the sandbar shark is typically 35–41 years.

== Interactions with humans ==
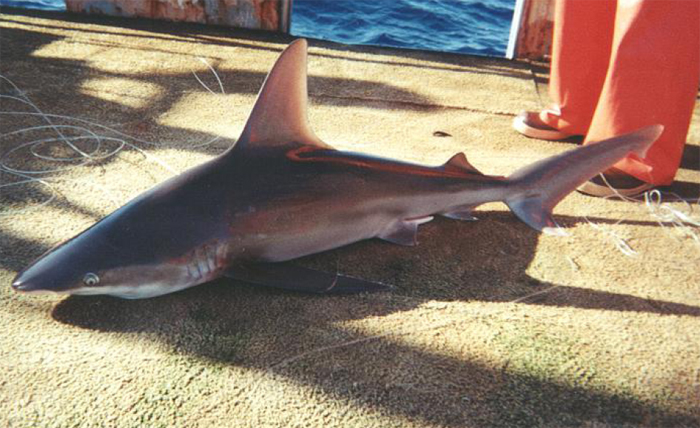
Captured shark

=== Fishing restrictions ===
Sandbar sharks have been disproportionately targeted by the U.S. commercial shark fisheries in recent decades due to their high fin-to-body weight ratio, and U.S. fishing regulation requiring carcasses to be landed along with shark fins. In 2008, the National Marine Fisheries Service banned all commercial landings of sandbar sharks based on a 2006 stock assessment by SEDAR, and sandbar sharks were listed as vulnerable, due to overfishing. Currently, a small number of specially permitted vessels fish for sandbar sharks for the purpose of scientific research. All vessels in the research fishery are required to carry an independent researcher while targeting sandbars.

=== Danger to people ===
In spite of their large size and similar appearance to other dangerous sharks such as bull sharks, sandbar sharks are not considered to be dangerous to people. Very few attacks are attributed to sandbar sharks. As a result, they are considered one of the safest sharks to swim with and are popular sharks for aquaria. However, on August 2, 2021, a 12-year-old girl was bitten on her leg by a sandbar shark in Ocean City, Maryland, United States. This was confirmed by Ocean City authorities on August 5, 2021. The victim required 42 stitches.

== Immune system studies ==
Immune system genes, specifically MHC genes, are under study to understand the adaptive immune system in sharks such as the sandbar. Sandbars contain MHC class I, MHC class IIα, and class IIβ genes. Shark MHC genes are known to be similar to tetrapod rather than fish. Similarities include the lack of cysteines in class IIα1 domains in tetrapods and carcharhinids. Also, there are a fewer number of classical loci in sharks and tetrapods, when compared to other animals.

== Conservation status ==
The New Zealand Department of Conservation has classified the sandbar shark as "Data Deficient" under the New Zealand Threat Classification System.

== See also ==
- List of sharks
