= Friedrich Gustav Jakob Henle =

German physician (1809–1885)

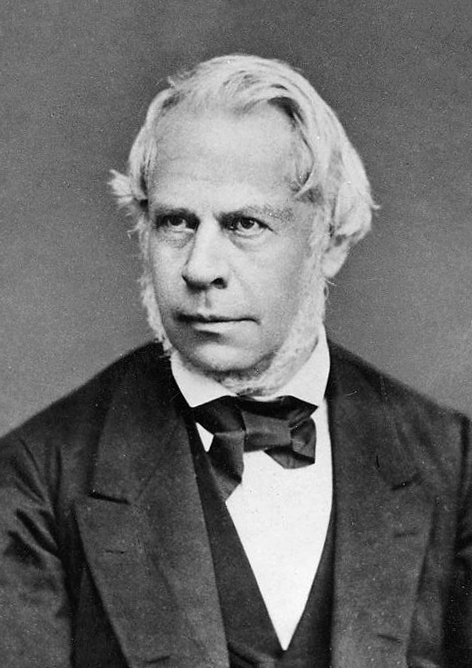
- Born: 9 July 1809; Fürth, Kingdom of Bavaria
- Died: 13 May 1885 (aged 75); Göttingen, German Empire
- Education: University of Heidelberg; University of Bonn
- Known for: Loop of Henle, Handbook of Systematic Human Anatomy
- Scientific career
- Fields: Pathology, anatomy
- Doctoral advisor: Johannes Peter Müller

Friedrich Gustav Jakob Henle (German: [ˈhɛnlə]; 9 July 1809 – 13 May 1885) was a German medical doctor, pathologist, and anatomist. He is credited with the discovery of the loop of Henle in the kidney. His essay, "On Miasma and Contagia," was an early argument for the germ theory of disease. He was an important figure in the development of modern medicine.

== Biography ==
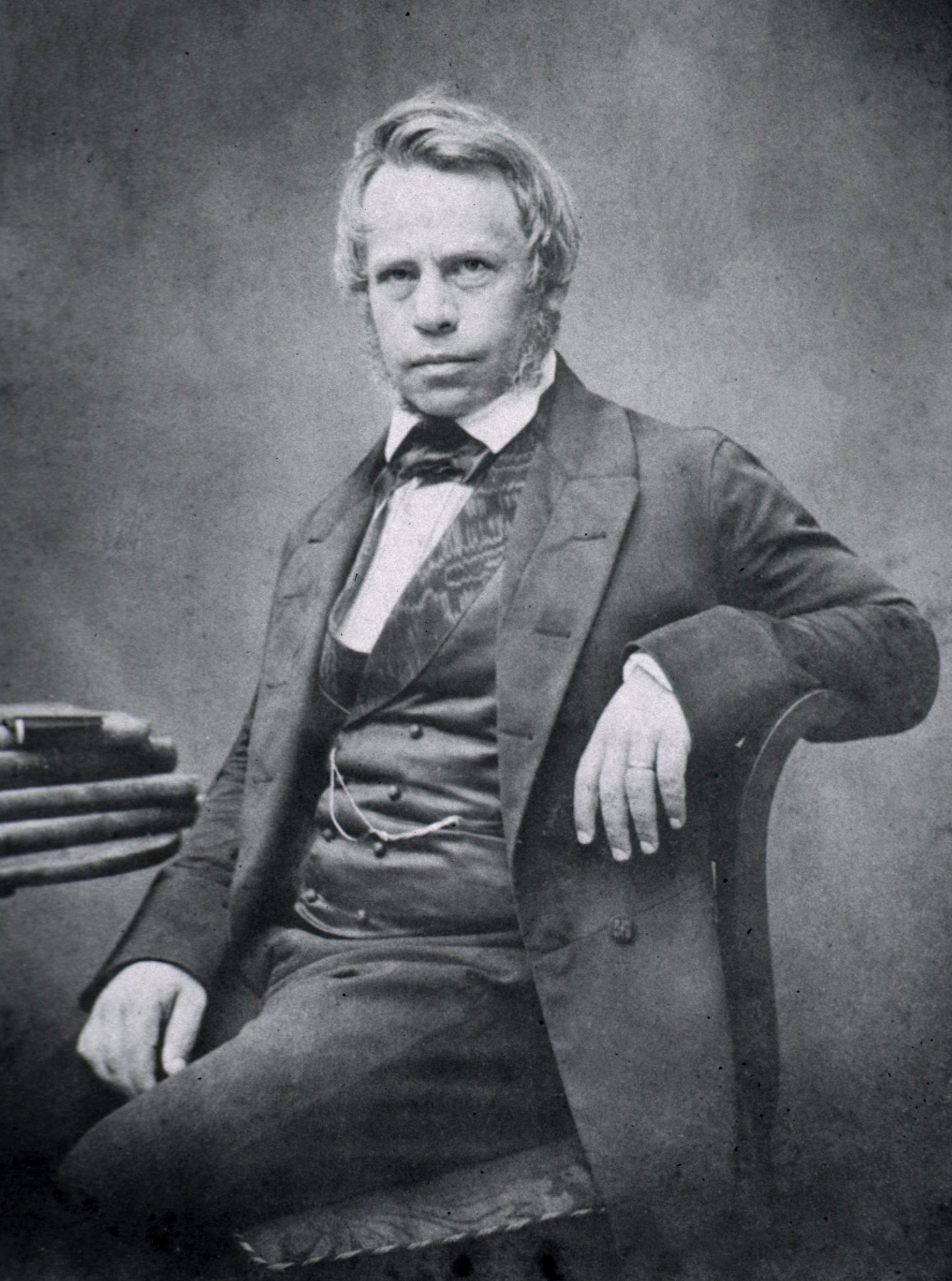
Jakob Henle

Henle was born in Fürth, Bavaria, to Simon and Rachel Diesbach Henle (Hähnlein). He was Jewish. After studying medicine at Heidelberg and at Bonn, where he took his doctor's degree in 1832, he became prosector in anatomy to Johannes Müller at Berlin. During the six years he spent in that position he published a large amount of work, including three anatomical monographs on new species of animals and papers on the structure of the lymphatic system, the distribution of epithelium in the human body, the structure and development of the hair, and the formation of mucus and pus. He also developed a friendship with another assistant of Müller, Theodor Schwann, which later became famous for his cell theory.

In 1840, he accepted the chair of anatomy at Zürich and in 1844 he was called to Heidelberg, where he taught anatomy, physiology, and pathology. About this period he was engaged on delineating his complete system of general anatomy, which formed the sixth volume of the new edition of Samuel Thomas von Sömmering's treatise, published at Leipzig between 1841 and 1844. While at Heidelberg he published a zoological monograph on the sharks and rays, in conjunction with his master Müller, and in 1846 his famous Manual of Rational Pathology began to appear; this marked the beginning of a new era in pathological study, since in it physiology and pathology were treated, in Henle's own words, as branches of one science, and the facts of disease were systematically considered with reference to their physiological relations.

In 1841, Henle was the first to observe microscopic mites residing in human hair follicles. Although he did not formally describe them, his student Gustav Simon later identified and described these organisms in 1842, naming them Acarus folliculorum (now known as Demodex folliculorum). This early observation laid the groundwork for future research into the role of Demodex mites in dermatological conditions.

In 1852, he moved to Göttingen, whence he issued three years later the first instalment of his great Handbook of Systematic Human Anatomy, the last volume of which was not published until 1873. This work was perhaps the most complete and comprehensive of its kind at that time, and it was remarkable not only for the fullness and minuteness of its anatomical descriptions but also for the number and excellence of the illustrations with which they elucidated minute anatomy of the blood vessels, serous membranes, kidney, eye, nails, central nervous system, etc. He discovered the loop of Henle and Henle's tubules, two anatomical structures in the kidney.

Other anatomical and pathological findings associated with his name are:

- Crypts of Henle: microscopic pockets located in the conjunctiva of the eye.
- Hassall–Henle bodies: transparent growths in the periphery of the Descemet's membrane of the eye.
- Henle's fissure: fibrous tissue between the cardiac muscle fibers.
- Henle's ampulla: ampulla of the uterine tube.
- Henle's layer: outer layer of cells of root sheath of a hair follicle.
- Henle's ligament: tendon of the transversus abdominis muscle.
- Henle's membrane: Bruch's layer forming inner boundary of the choroid of the eye.
- Henle's sheath: connective tissue which supports outer layer of nerve fibres in a funiculus.
- Henle's spine: the supra-meateal spine that serves as a landmark in the mastoid area.
- Glands of Henle: depressions in the eye in which epithelial cells accumulate in cases of cicatricial trachoma.
- Tubes of Henle: numerous tiny tubes connecting the choroid to retina, carrying vessels and nerves.

Henle developed the concepts of contagium vivum and contagium animatum, respectively (Von den Miasmen und Kontagien, 1840) – thereby following ideas of Girolamo Fracastoro and the work of Agostino Bassi; thus, co-founding the theory of microorganisms as the cause of infective diseases. He did not find a special species of bacteria himself – this was achieved by his student Robert Koch. Those two put up the fundamental rules of cleanly defining disease-causing microbes: the Henle Koch postulates.

In 1870, he was elected a foreign member of the Royal Swedish Academy of Sciences. He died in Göttingen on 13 May 1885.

== Bibliography ==
- Ueber die Ausbreitung des Epithelium im menschlichen Körper (1838)
- Allgemeine Anatomie: Lehre von den Mischungs- und Formbestandtheilen des menschlichen Körpers (1841)
- Handbuch der rationellen Pathologie (1846–1853)
- Handbuch der systematischen Anatomie des Menschen (1855–1871)
- Vergleichend-anatomische Beschreibung des Kehlkopfes mit besonderer Berücksichtigung des Kehlkopfes der Reptilien (1839)
- Pathologische Untersuchungen (1840)
- Zur Anatomie der Niere (1863)

== See also ==
- Category:Taxa named by Friedrich Gustav Jakob Henle
