= Reef shark =

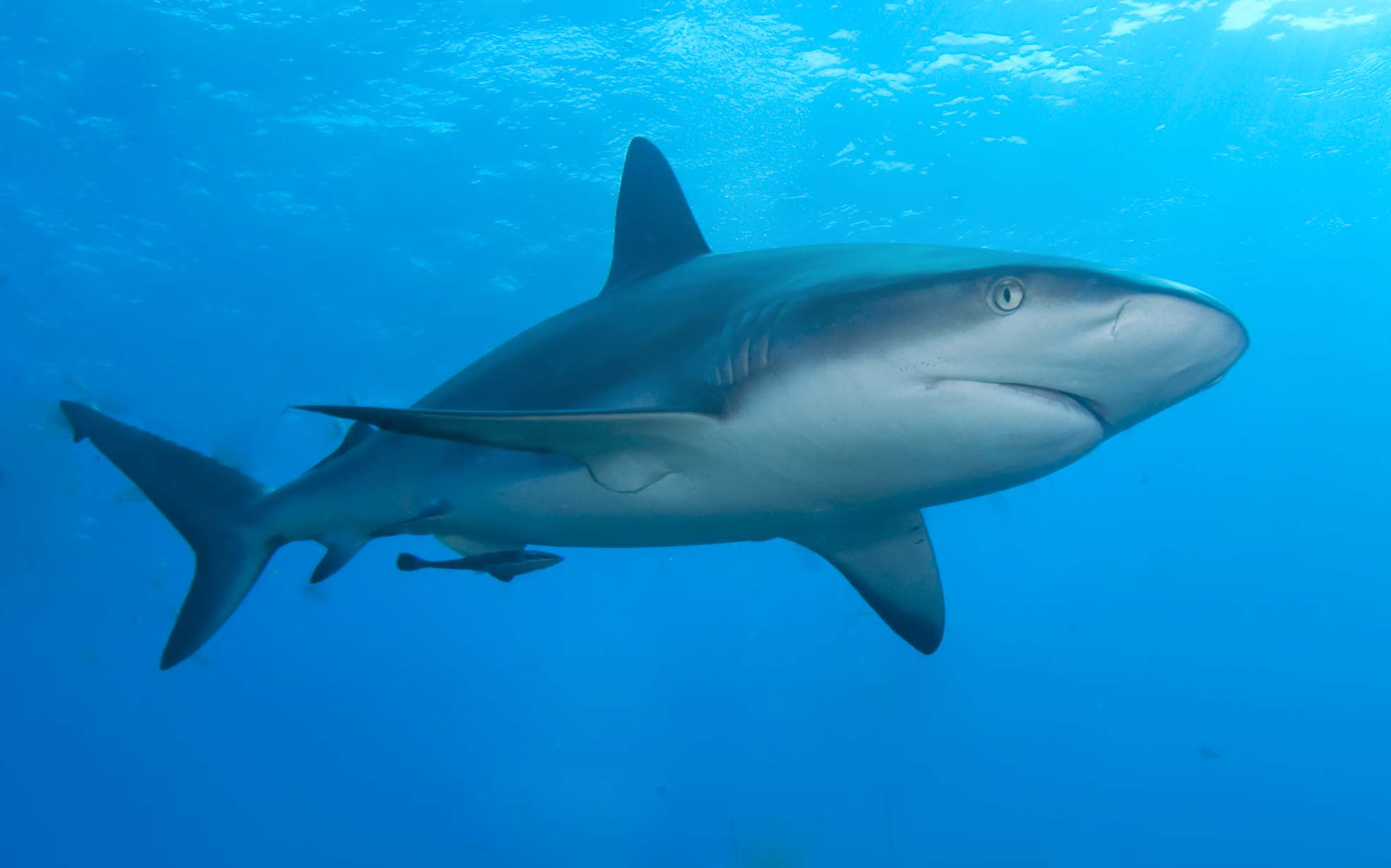
Caribbean reef shark

This article lists several species of reef-associated sharks which are known by the common name reef sharks.

In the Indian and Pacific Oceans:

- Blacktip reef shark
- Grey reef shark
- Whitetip reef shark

In the Atlantic and Pacific Oceans:

- Galapagos shark

In the Atlantic Ocean:

- Caribbean reef shark
