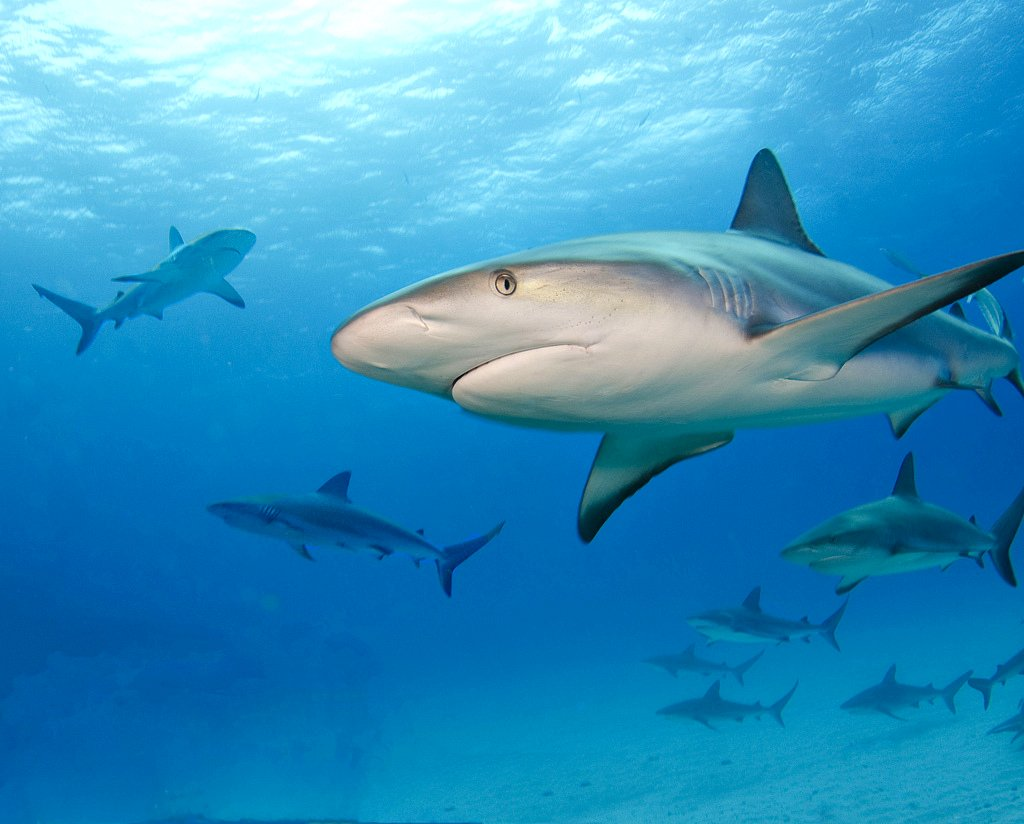

Conservation status
- Endangered (IUCN 3.1)

Scientific classification
- Kingdom: Animalia
- Phylum: Chordata
- Class: Chondrichthyes
- Subclass: Elasmobranchii
- Division: Selachii
- Order: Carcharhiniformes
- Family: Carcharhinidae
- Genus: Carcharhinus
- Species: C. perezi

Binomial name
- Carcharhinus perezi (Poey, 1876)
- Range of the Caribbean reef shark

Synonyms
- Eulamia springeri Bigelow & Schroeder, 1944; Platypodon perezi Poey, 1876

= Caribbean reef shark =

Caribbean reef shark Temporal range: Early Miocene to present

Species of shark

The Caribbean reef shark (Carcharhinus perezi) is a species of requiem shark, belonging to the family Carcharhinidae. It is found in the tropical waters of the western Atlantic Ocean from Florida to Brazil, and is the most commonly encountered reef shark in the Caribbean Sea. With a robust, streamlined body typical of the requiem sharks, this species is difficult to tell apart from other large members of its family such as the dusky shark (C. obscurus) and the silky shark (C. falciformis). Distinguishing characteristics include dusky-colored fins without prominent markings, a short free rear tip on the second dorsal fin, and tooth shape and number.

Measuring up to 3 m (9.8 ft) long, the Caribbean reef shark is one of the largest apex predators in the reef ecosystem, feeding on a variety of fishes and cephalopods. They have been documented resting motionless on the sea bottom or inside caves, unusual behavior for an active-swimming shark. If threatened, it may perform a threat display in which it frequently changes direction and dips its pectoral fins. Like other requiem sharks, it is viviparous with females giving birth to 4–6 young every other year. Caribbean reef sharks are of some importance to fisheries as a source of meat, leather, liver oil, and fishmeal, but recently they have become more valuable as an ecotourist attraction. In the Bahamas and elsewhere, bait is used to attract them to groups of divers in controversial "shark feedings". This species is responsible for a small number of attacks on humans. The shark attacks usually happen in spring and summer.

== Taxonomy and phylogeny ==
The Caribbean reef shark was originally described as Platypodon perezi by Felipe Poey in 1876, in the scientific journal Anales de la Sociedad Española de Historia Natural. The type specimens were six individuals caught off the coast of Cuba. The genus Platypodon was synonymized with Carcharhinus by later authors.

Based on morphological similarities, Jack Garrick in 1982 grouped this species with the bignose shark (C. altimus) and the sandbar shark (C. plumbeus), while Leonard Compagno in 1988 placed it as the sister species of the grey reef shark (C. amblyrhynchos). A phylogenetic analysis based on allozyme data, published by Gavin Naylor in 1992, indicated that the Caribbean reef shark is the sister taxon to a clade formed by the Galapagos shark (C. galapagensis), dusky shark (C. obscurus), oceanic whitetip shark (C. longimanus), and the blue shark (Prionace glauca). However, more work is required to fully resolve the interrelationships within Carcharhinus.

The earliest fossil teeth of the species are known from the Early Miocene of northern Brazil, Delaware (US), and Venezuela. Most fossil teeth of C. perezi are known from the east coast of the Americas, as with the modern distribution of the species, but they are also known from the Late Miocene of Portugal and the Pliocene of Italy.

== Distribution and habitat ==
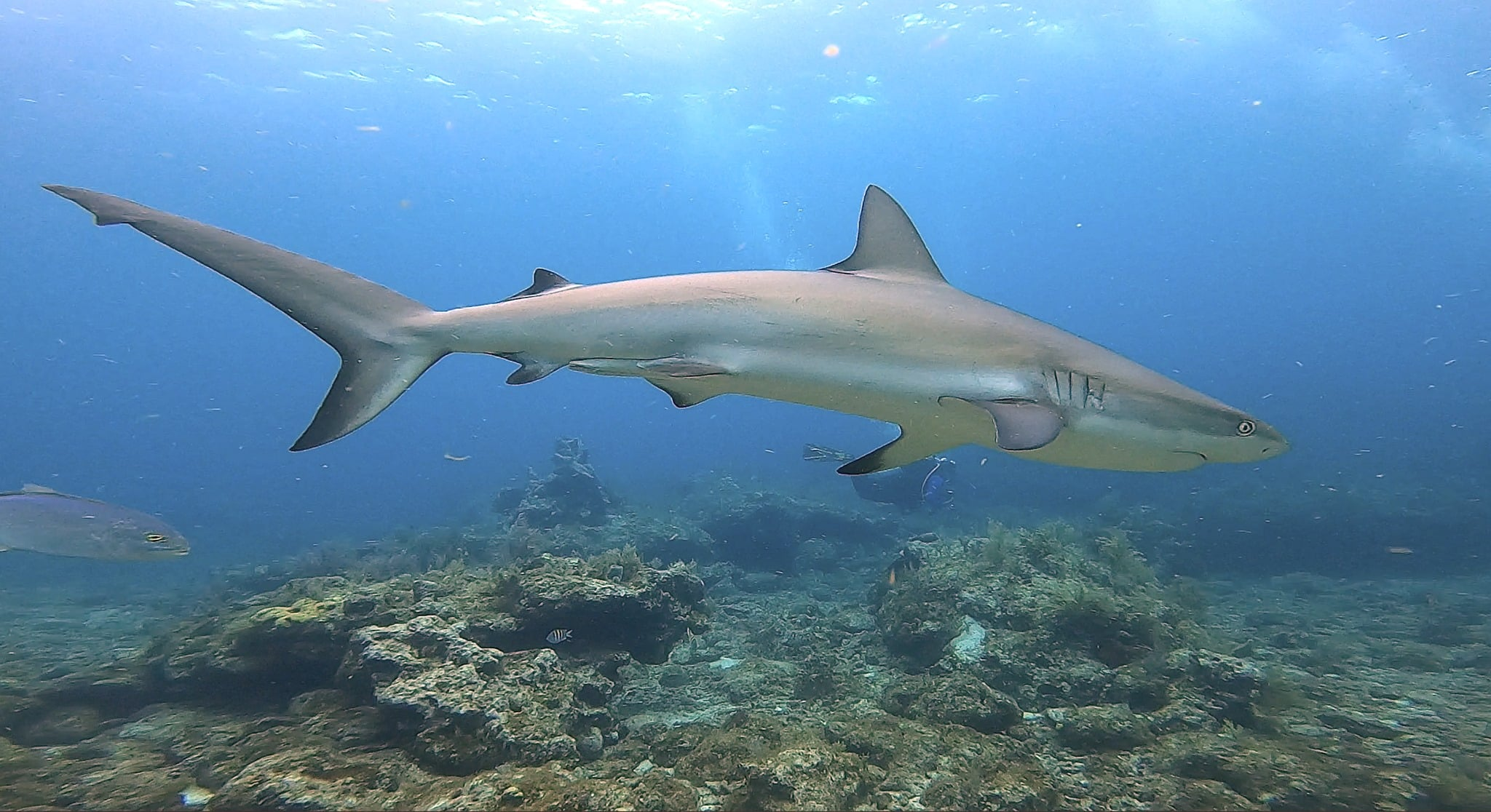
Caribbean Reef Shark at North Dry Rocks Reef, Key Largo, Fl.

The Caribbean reef shark occurs throughout the tropical western Atlantic Ocean, from North Carolina in the north to Brazil in the south, including Bermuda, the northern Gulf of Mexico, and the Caribbean Sea. However, it is extremely rare north of the Florida Keys. It prefers shallow waters on or around coral reefs, and is commonly found near the drop-offs at the reefs' outer edges. This shark is most common in water shallower than 30 m (98 ft), but has been known to dive to 378 m (1,240 ft).

== Description ==
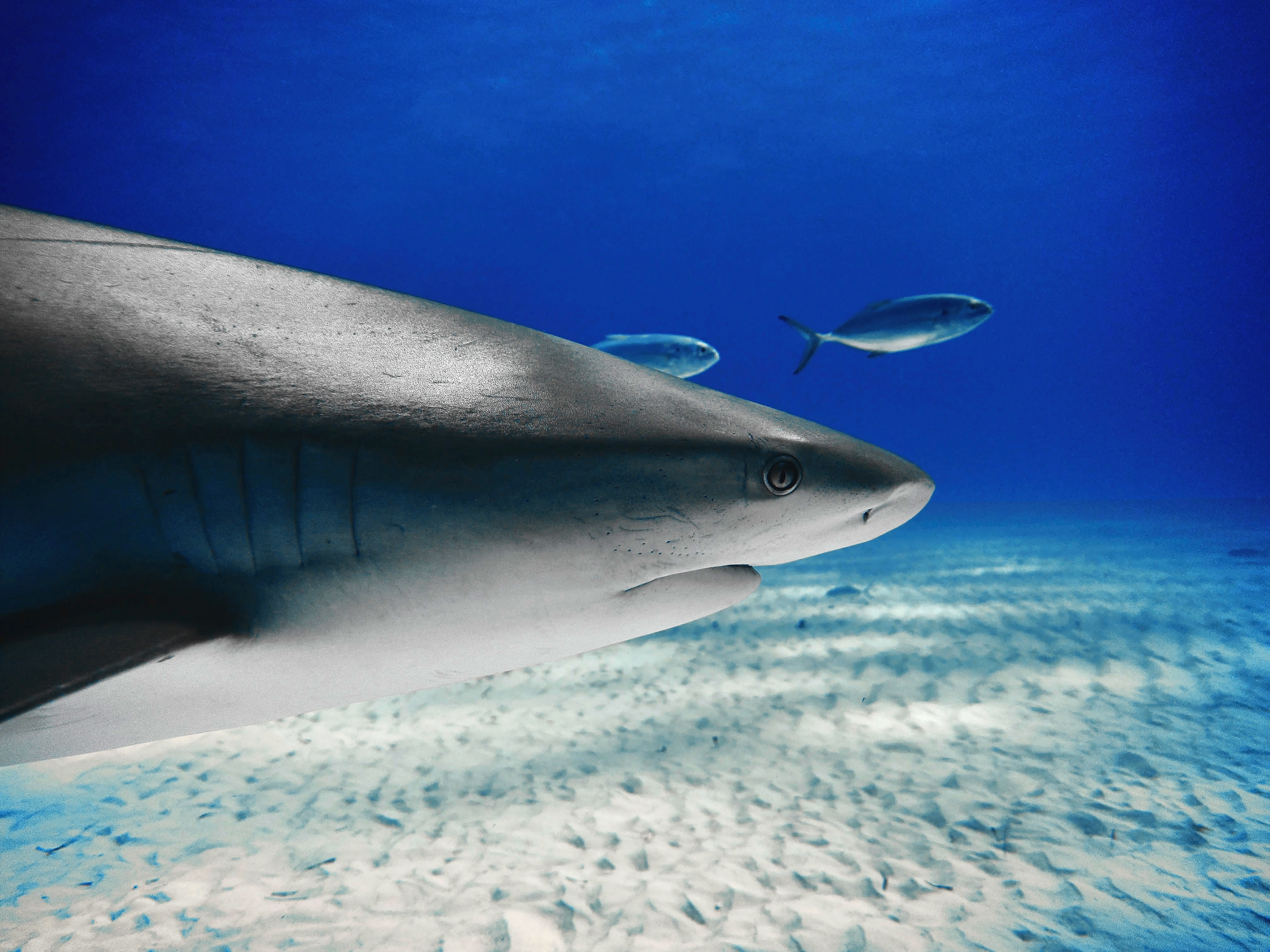
Close-up of a Caribbean Reef Shark at Tiger Beach, Bahamas

A heavy-bodied shark with a "typical" streamlined shape, the Caribbean reef shark is difficult to distinguish from other large requiem shark species. It usually measures 2–2.5 m (6.6–8.2 ft) long; the maximum recorded length is 3 m (9.8 ft) and the maximum reported weight is 70 kg (150 lb). The coloration is dark gray or gray-brown above and white or white-yellow below, with an inconspicuous white band on the flanks. The fins are not prominently marked, and the undersides of the paired fins, the anal fin, and the lower lobe of the caudal fin are dusky.

The snout is rather short, broad, and rounded, without prominent flaps of skin beside the nostrils. The eyes are large and circular, with nictitating membranes (protective third eyelids). There are 11–13 tooth rows in either half of both jaws. The teeth have broad bases, serrated edges, and narrow cusps; the front 2–4 teeth on each side are erect and the others increasingly oblique. The five pairs of gill slits are moderately long, with the third gill slit over the origin of the pectoral fins. The first dorsal fin is high and falcate (sickle-shaped). There is a low interdorsal ridge running behind it to the second dorsal fin, which is relatively large with a short free rear tip. The origin of the first dorsal fin lies over or slightly forward of the free rear tips of the pectoral fins, and that of the second dorsal fin lies over or slightly forward of the anal fin. The pectoral fins are long and narrow, tapering to a point. The dermal denticles are closely spaced and overlapping, each with five (sometimes seven in large individuals) horizontal low ridges leading to marginal teeth.

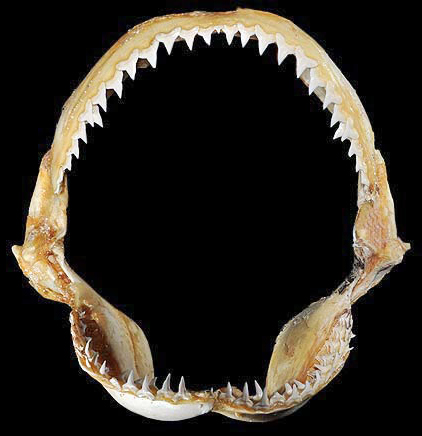
Jaws

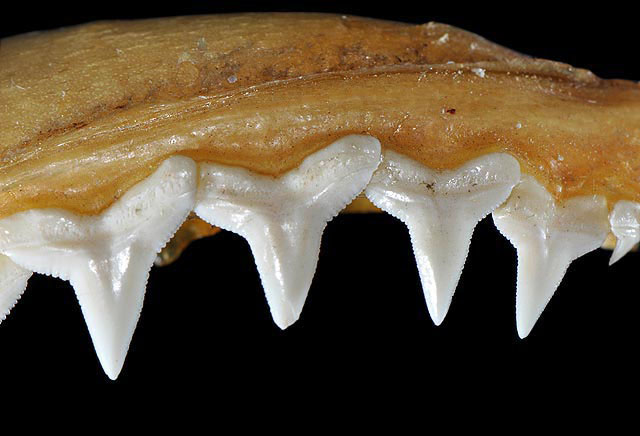
Upper teeth

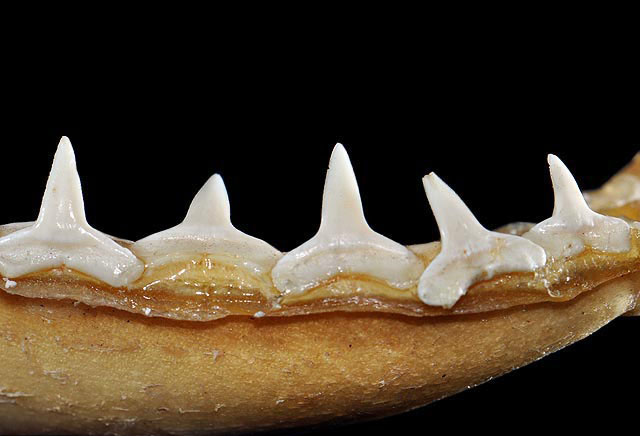
Lower teeth

== Biology and ecology ==
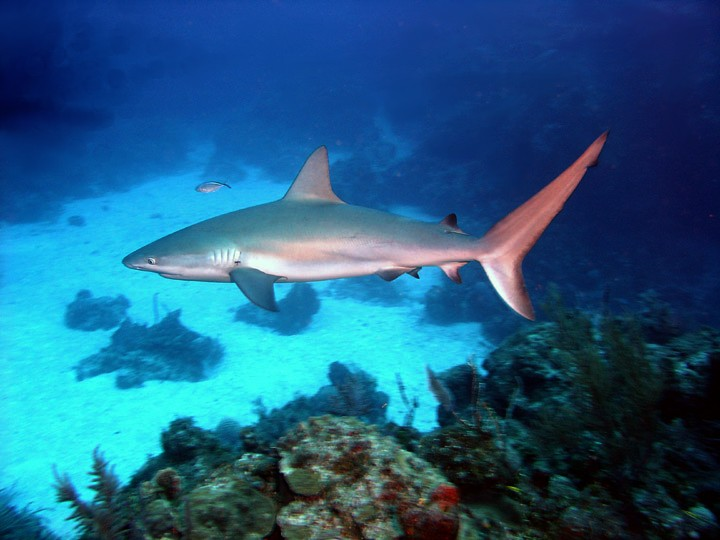
A Caribbean reef shark cruising over a coral reef in the Bahamas.

Despite its abundance in certain areas, the Caribbean reef shark is one of the least-studied large requiem sharks. They are believed to play a major role in shaping Caribbean reef communities. These sharks are more active at night, with no evidence of seasonal changes in activity or migration. Juveniles tend to remain in a localized area throughout the year, while adults range over a wider area.

Caribbean reef sharks are sometimes seen resting motionless on the sea floor or inside caves; it is the first active shark species in which such a behavior was reported. In 1975, Eugenie Clark investigated the famed "sleeping sharks" inside the caves at Isla Mujeres off the Yucatan Peninsula, and determined that the sharks were not actually asleep as their eyes would follow divers. Clark speculated that freshwater upwellings inside the caves might loosen parasites on the sharks and produce an enjoyable "narcotic" effect. If threatened, Caribbean reef sharks sometimes perform a threat display, in which they swim in a short, jerky fashion with frequent changes in direction and repeated, brief (1–1.2 second duration) drops of the pectoral fins. This display is less pronounced than the better-known display of the grey reef shark (C. amblyrhynchos).

Juvenile Caribbean reef sharks are preyed upon by larger sharks such as the tiger shark (Galeocerdo cuvier) and the bull shark (C. leucas). Few parasites are known for this species; one is a dark variegated leech often seen trailing from its first dorsal fin. Off northern Brazil, juveniles seek out cleaning stations occupied by yellownose gobies (Elacatinus randalli), which clean the sharks of parasites while they lie still on the bottom. Horse-eye jacks (Caranx latus) and bar jacks (Carangoides ruber) routinely school around Caribbean reef sharks.

=== Feeding ===
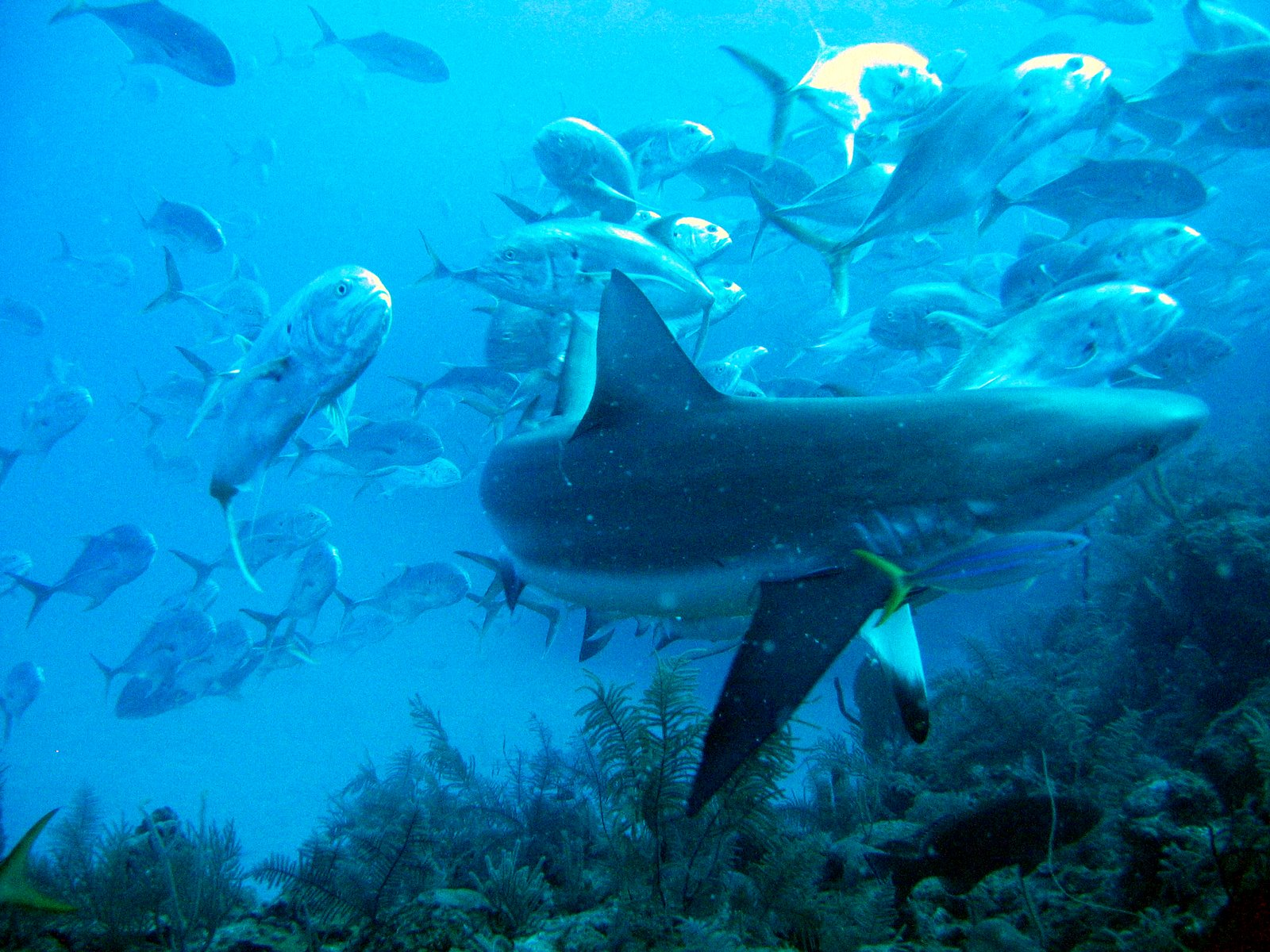
A Caribbean reef shark surrounded by jacks.

The Caribbean reef shark feeds on a wide variety of reef-dwelling bony fishes and cephalopods, as well as some elasmobranchs such as eagle rays (Aetobatus narinari) and yellow stingrays (Urobatis jamaicensis). It is attracted to low-frequency sounds, which are indicative of struggling fish. In one observation of a 2 m (6.6 ft) long male Caribbean reef shark hunting a yellowtail snapper (Lutjanus crysurus), the shark languidly circled and made several seemingly "half-hearted" turns towards its prey, before suddenly accelerating and swinging its head sideways to capture the snapper at the corner of its jaws. Young sharks feed on small fishes, shrimps, and crabs. Caribbean reef sharks are capable of everting their stomachs, which likely serves to cleanse indigestible particles, parasites, and mucus from the stomach lining.

=== Life history ===
Reproduction is viviparous; once the developing embryos exhaust their supply of yolk, the yolk sac develops into a placental connection through which they receive nourishment from their mother. Mating is apparently an aggressive affair, as females are often found with biting scars and wounds on their sides. At the Fernando de Noronha Archipelago and Atol das Rocas off Brazil, parturition takes place at the end of the dry season from February to April, while at other locations in the Southern Hemisphere, females give birth during the Amazon summer in November and December. The average litter size is four to six, with a gestation period of one year. Females become pregnant every other year. The newborns measure no more than 74 cm (29 in) long; males mature sexually at 1.5–1.7 m (59–67 in) long and females at 2–3 m (79–118 in).

== Human interactions ==
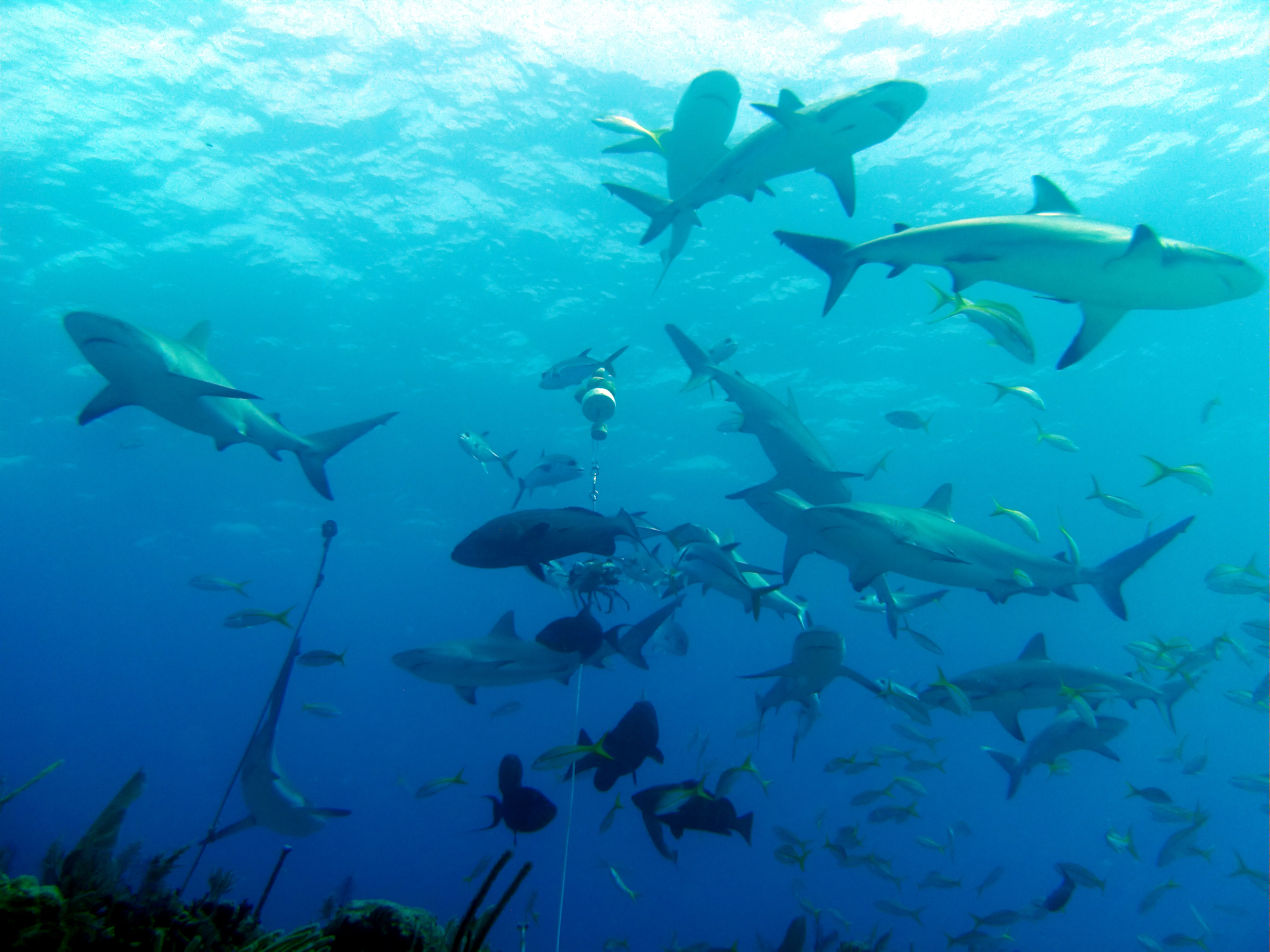
Numerous Caribbean reef sharks attracted to a bait ball.

Normally shy or indifferent to the presence of divers, the Caribbean reef shark has been known to become aggressive in the presence of food and grows sufficiently large to be considered potentially dangerous. As of 2008, the International Shark Attack File lists 27 attacks attributable to this species, 4 of them unprovoked, and none fatal.

This species is taken by commercial and artisanal longline and gillnet fisheries throughout its range. It is valued for meat, leather, liver oil and fishmeal. The Caribbean reef shark is the most common shark landed in Colombia (accounting for 39% of the longline catch by occurrence), where it is utilized for its fins, oil and jaws (sold for ornamental purposes). In Belize, this species is mainly caught as bycatch on hook-and-line intended for groupers and snappers; the fins are sold to the lucrative Asian market and the meat sold in Belize, Mexico, and Guatemala to make "panades", a tortilla-like confection. A dedicated shark fishery operated in Belize from the mid-1900s to the early 1990s, until catches of all species saw dramatic declines. The flesh of this species may contain high levels of methylmercury and other heavy metals.

=== Shark feeding ===
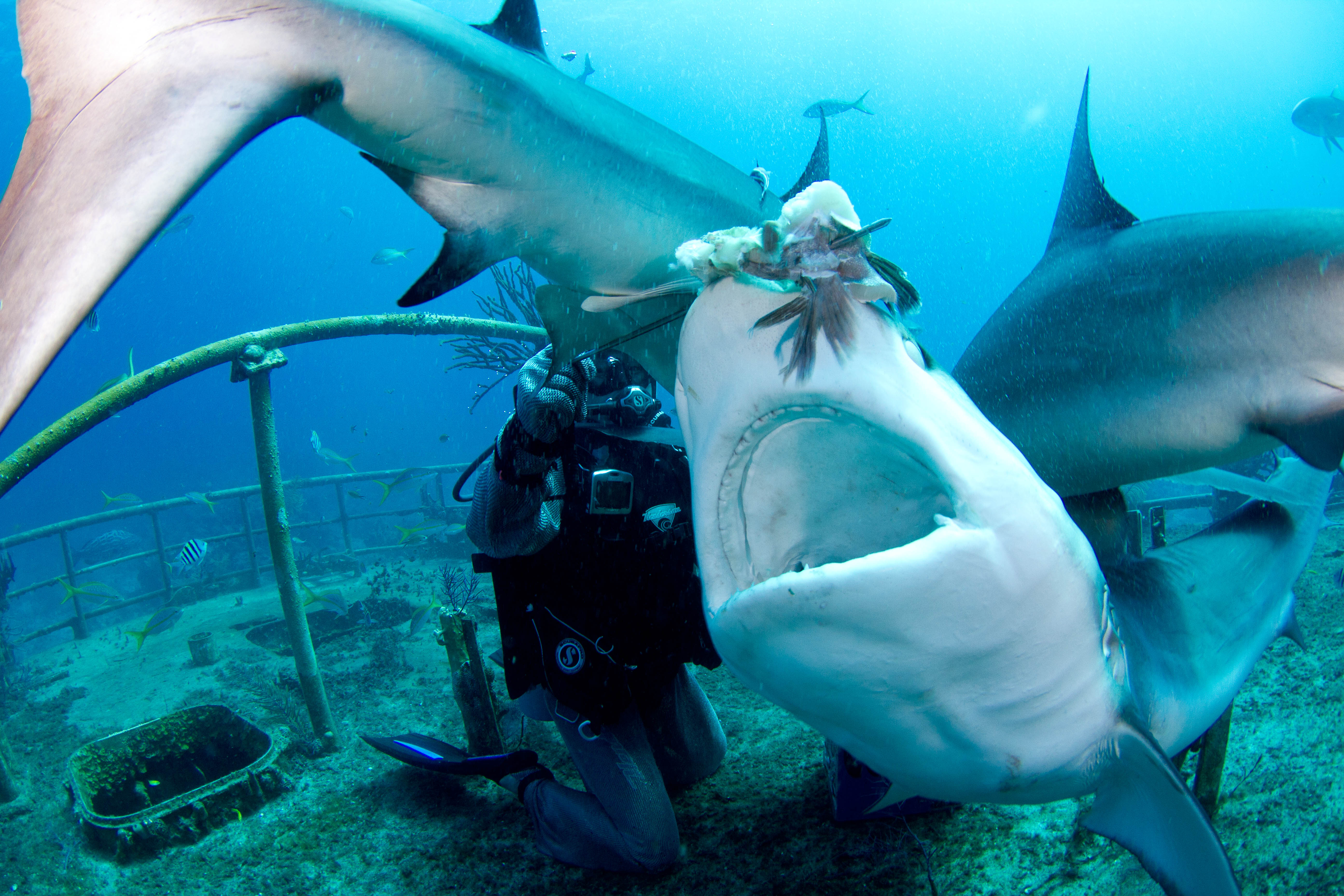
Several Caribbean reef sharks being fed at a "shark feed" in the Bahamas.

A profitable ecotourism industry has arisen around this species involving organized "shark feeds", in which groups of reef sharks are attracted to divers using bait. Some US$6,000,000 is spent annually on shark viewing in the Bahamas, where at some sites a single living Caribbean reef shark has a value between US$13,000 and US$40,000 (compared to a one-time value of US$50–60 for a dead shark). This practice has drawn controversy, as opponents argue that the sharks may learn to associate humans with food, increasing the chances of a shark attack, and that the removal of reef fishes for bait may damage the local ecosystem. Conversely, proponents maintain that shark feeds contribute to conservation by incentivizing the protection of sharks and educating people about them. Thus far, there has been little evidence that shark feeds have increased the risk of attack in the surrounding area. Shark feeding has been outlawed off the coast of Florida, but continues at other locations in the Caribbean.

=== Conservation ===
The International Union for Conservation of Nature (IUCN) has assessed the Caribbean reef shark as Endangered; its population has declined off Belize and Cuba from overfishing and exploitation continues in other regions. They are also threatened by the degradation and destruction of their coral reef habitat. Commercial fishing for this species is prohibited in United States waters. They are protected in the Bahamas due to their significance to ecotourism, as well as in a number of Marine Protected Areas (MPAs) off Brazil and elsewhere. However, enforcement against illegal fishing is lacking in some of these reserves, and many areas in which this species is abundant are not protected.
