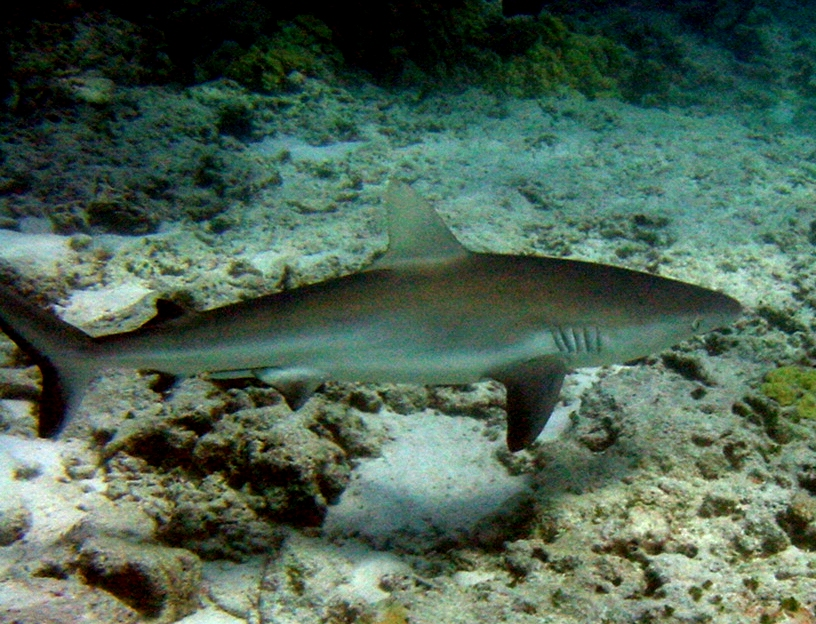

Conservation status
- Least Concern (IUCN 3.1)

Scientific classification
- Kingdom: Animalia
- Phylum: Chordata
- Class: Chondrichthyes
- Subclass: Elasmobranchii
- Division: Selachii
- Order: Carcharhiniformes
- Family: Carcharhinidae
- Genus: Carcharhinus
- Species: C. galapagensis

Binomial name
- Carcharhinus galapagensis (Snodgrass & Heller, 1905)
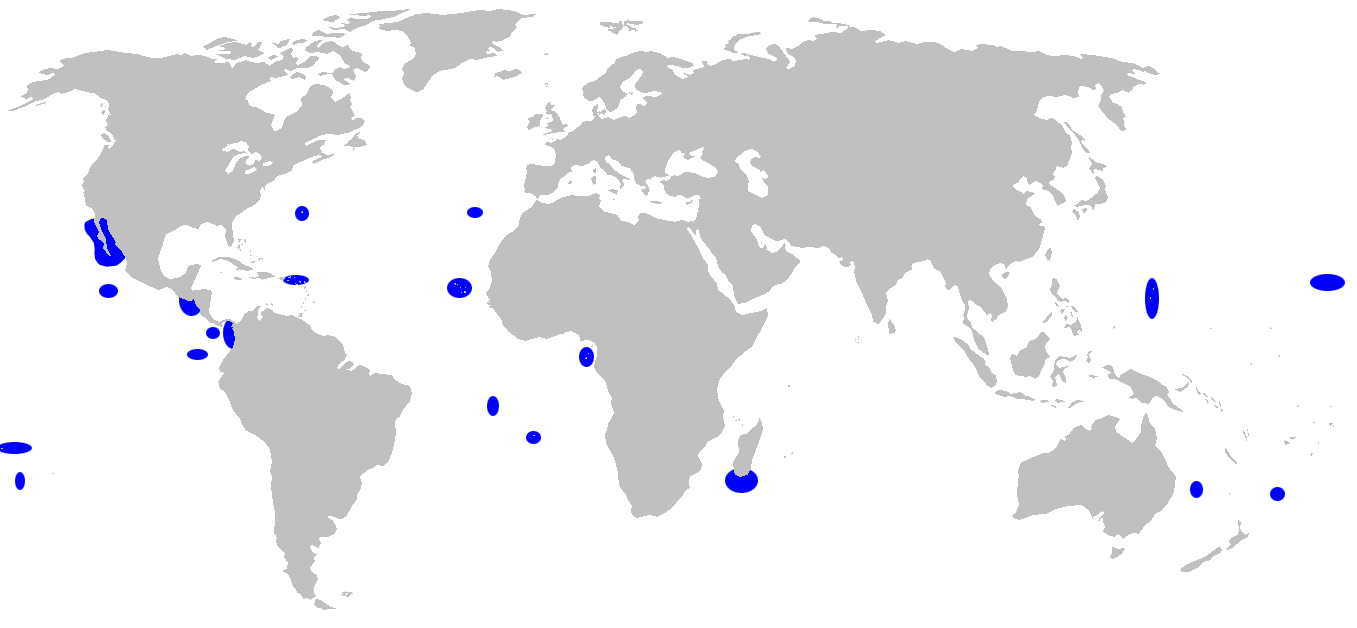
- Range of the Galapagos shark

Synonyms
- Carcharias galapagensis Snodgrass & Heller, 1905

= Galapagos shark =

Galapagos shark Temporal range: Pliocene–Recent

Species of shark

The Galapagos shark (Carcharhinus galapagensis) is a species of requiem shark, in the family Carcharhinidae, found worldwide. It favors clear reef environments around oceanic islands, where it is often the most abundant shark species. A large species that often reaches 3.0 m (9.8 ft), the Galapagos reef shark has a typical fusiform "reef shark" shape and is very difficult to distinguish from the dusky shark (C. obscurus) and the grey reef shark (C. amblyrhynchos). An identifying character of this species is its tall first dorsal fin, which has a slightly rounded tip and originates over the rear tips of the pectoral fins.

The Galapagos shark is an active predator often encountered in large groups. It feeds mainly on bottom-dwelling bony fishes and cephalopods; larger individuals have a much more varied diet, consuming other sharks, marine iguanas, sea lions, and even garbage. As in other requiem sharks, reproduction is viviparous, with females bearing litters of 4–16 pups every 2 to 3 years. The juveniles tend to remain in shallow water to avoid predation by the adults. The International Union for Conservation of Nature (IUCN) has assessed this species as least concern, but it has a slow reproductive rate and there is heavy fishing pressure across its range.

== Taxonomy and phylogeny ==
The Galapagos shark was originally described as Carcharias galapagensis by Robert Evans Snodgrass and Edmund Heller in 1905; subsequent authors moved this species to the genus Carcharhinus. The holotype was a 65 cm (2.13 ft) long fetus from the Galapagos Islands, hence the specific epithet galapagensis.

Garrick (1982) placed the Galapagos shark and the dusky shark at the center of the "obscurus group", one of two major groupings within Carcharhinus. The group consisted of the bignose shark (C. altimus), Caribbean reef shark (C. perezi), sandbar shark (C. plumbeus), dusky shark (C. obscurus), and oceanic whitetip shark (C. longimanus), all large, triangular-toothed sharks and is defined by the presence of a ridge between the two dorsal fins. Based on allozyme data, naylor (1992) reaffirmed the integrity of this group, with the additions of the silky shark (C. falciformis) and the blue shark (Prionace glauca). The closest relatives of the Galapagos shark were found to be the dusky, oceanic whitetip, and blue sharks.

== Distribution and habitat ==
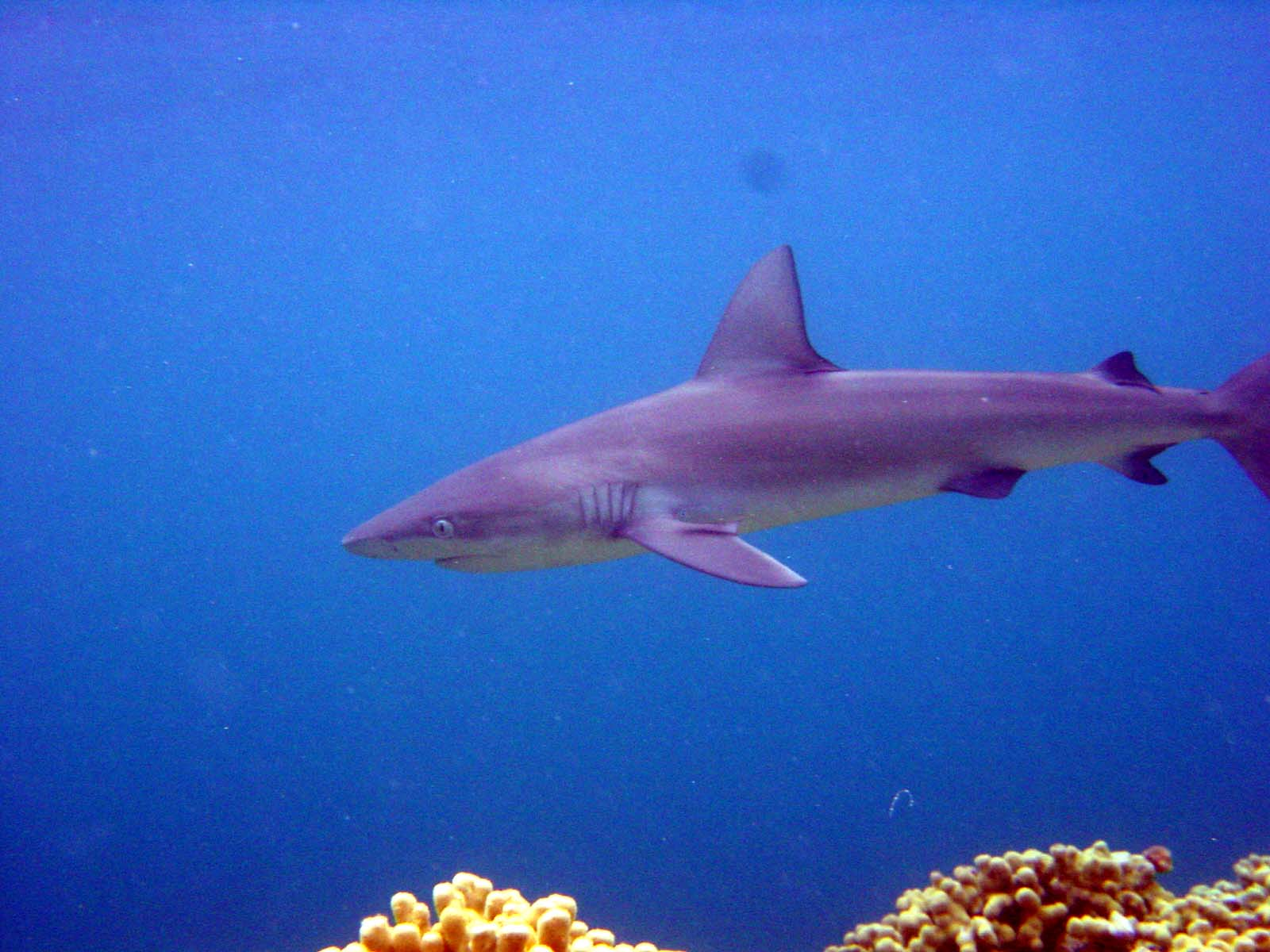
Galapagos sharks are common around oceanic island reefs.

The Galapagos shark is found mainly off tropical oceanic islands. In the Atlantic Ocean, it occurs around Bermuda, the Virgin Islands, Madeira, Cape Verde, Ascension Island, Saint Helena and São Tomé Island. In the Indian Ocean, it is known from Walter's Shoal off southern Madagascar. In the Pacific Ocean, it occurs around Lord Howe Island, the Marianas Islands, the Marshall Islands, the Kermadec Islands, Tupai, the Tuamotu Archipelago, the Juan Fernández Islands, the Hawaiian Islands, the Galapagos Islands, Cocos Island, the Revillagigedo Islands, Clipperton Island, and Malpelo. There are a few reports of this species in continental waters off the Iberian Peninsula, Baja California, Guatemala, Colombia, and eastern Australia.

The Galapagos shark is generally found over continental and insular shelves near the coast, preferring rugged reef habitats with clear water and strong converging currents. It is also known to form groups around rocky islets and seamounts. This species is capable of crossing the open ocean between islands and has been reported at least 50 km (31 mi) from land. Juveniles seldom venture deeper than 25 m (82 ft), while adults have been reported to a depth of 180 m (590 ft).

== Description ==
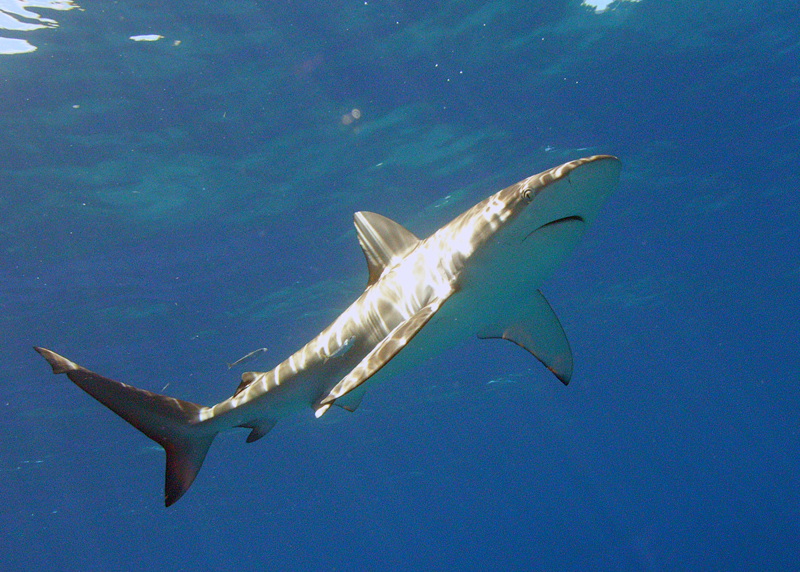
The Galapagos shark can be difficult to distinguish from other large requiem sharks

One of the largest species in its genus, the Galapagos shark commonly reaches 3.0 m (9.8 ft) long. The maximum length has been variously recorded as 3.3 m (11 ft) to 3.7 m (12 ft). The maximum recorded weight is 195 kg (430 lb) for a 3.0 m (9.8 ft) long female (longer specimens having apparently been unweighed). This species has a slender, streamlined body typical of the requiem sharks. The snout is wide and rounded, with indistinct anterior nasal flaps. The eyes are round and of medium size. The mouth usually contains 14 tooth rows (range 13–15) on either side of both jaws, plus one tooth at the symphysis (where the jaw halves meet). The upper teeth are stout and triangular in shape, while the lower teeth are narrower; both upper and lower teeth have serrated edges.

The first dorsal fin is tall and moderately falcate (sickle-shaped), with the origin over the pectoral fin rear tips. It is followed by a low midline ridge running to the second dorsal fin. The second dorsal fin originates over the anal fin. The pectoral fins are large with pointed tips. The coloration is brownish gray above and white below, with a faint white stripe on the sides. The edges of the fins are darker but not prominently marked. The Galapagos shark can be distinguished from the dusky shark in having taller first and second dorsal fins and larger teeth, and it can be distinguished from the grey reef shark in having a less robust body and less pointed first dorsal fin tip. However, these characters can be difficult to discern in the field. These similar species also have different numbers of precaudal (before the tail) vertebrae: 58 in the Galapagos shark, 86–97 in the dusky shark, 110–119 in the grey reef shark.

== Biology and ecology ==
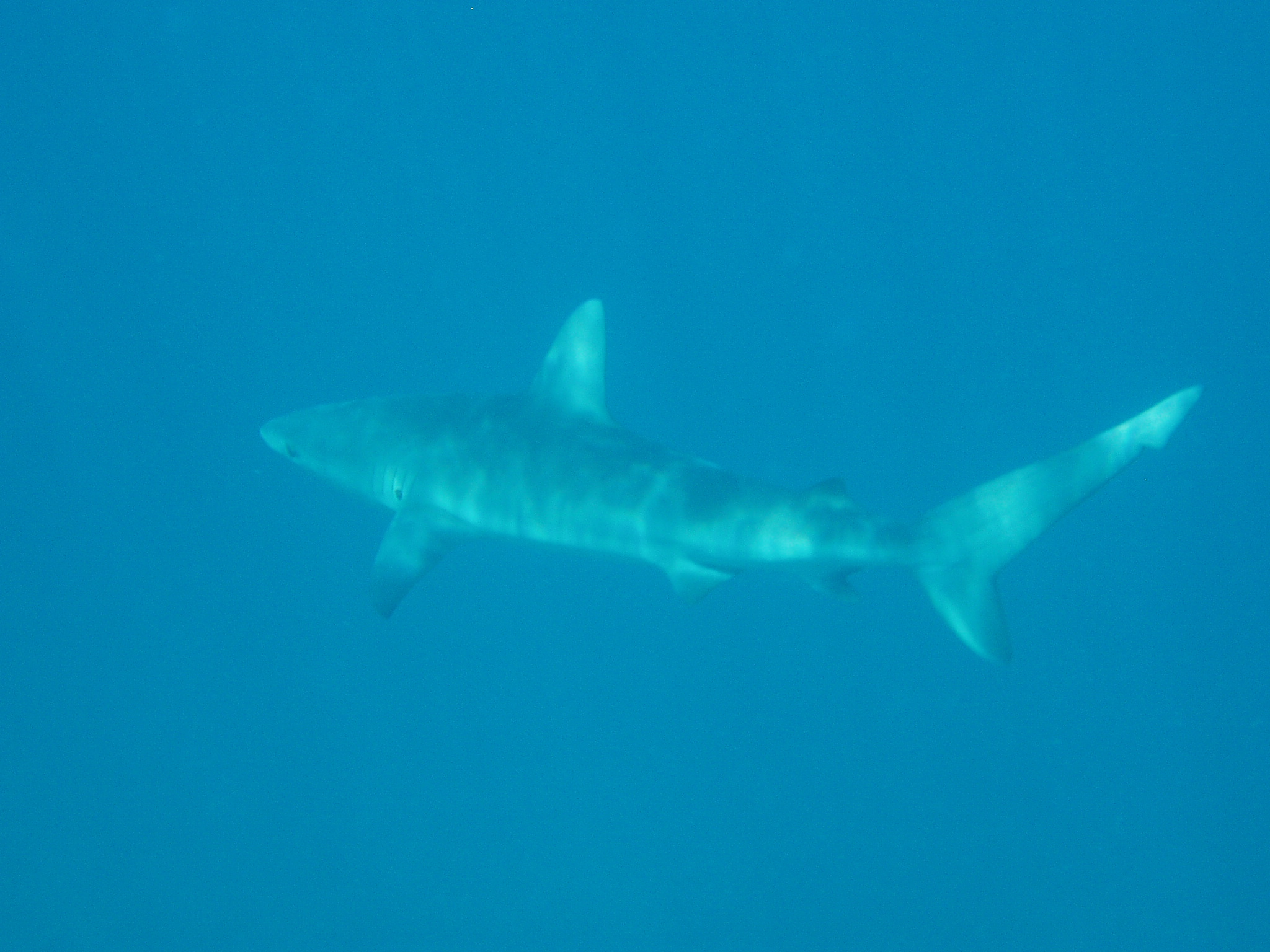
A Galapagos shark off Kure Atoll in the Hawaiian Islands

The Galapagos shark is often the most abundant shark in shallow island waters. In their original description of this species, Snodgrass and Heller noted that their schooner had taken "several hundred" adult Galapagos sharks and that "thousands" more could be seen in the water. At the isolated Saint Peter and Paul Rocks along the Mid-Atlantic Ridge, the resident Galapagos sharks have been described as "one of the densest shark populations of the Atlantic Ocean". At some locations they form large aggregations, though these are not true schools.

During group interactions, Galapagos sharks are dominant to blacktip sharks (C. limbatus) but deferent to silvertip sharks (C. albimarginatus) of equal size. When confronted or cornered, the Galapagos shark may perform a threat display similar to that of the grey reef shark, in which the shark performs an exaggerated, rolling swimming motion while arching its back, lowering its pectoral fins, puffing out its gills, and gaping its jaw. The shark may also swing its head from side to side, so as to keep the perceived threat within its field of vision. A known parasite of the Galapagos shark is the flatworm Dermophthirius carcharhini, which attaches to the shark's skin. In one account, a bluefin trevally (Caranax melampygus) was seen rubbing against the rough skin of a Galapagos shark to rid itself of parasites.

=== Feeding ===
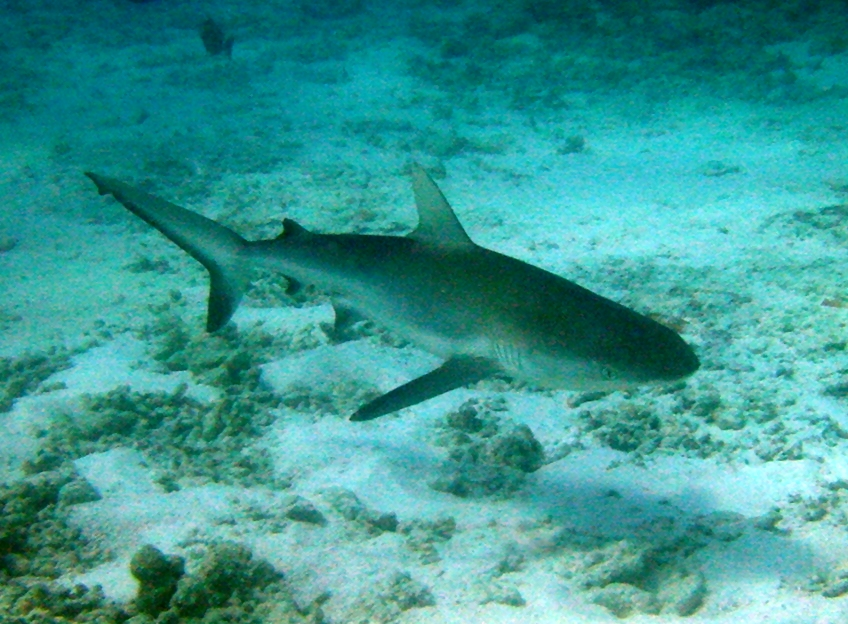
The Galapagos shark usually hunts near the sea bottom

The primary food of Galapagos sharks is benthic bony fishes (including eels, sea bass, flatfish, flatheads, and triggerfish) and octopuses. They also occasionally take surface-dwelling prey such as mackerel, flyingfish and squid. As the sharks grow larger, they consume increasing numbers of elasmobranchs (rays and smaller sharks, including of their own species) and crustaceans, as well as indigestible items such as leaves, coral, rocks, and garbage. At the Galapagos Islands, this species has been observed attacking Galapagos fur seals (Arctophoca galapagoensis) and sea lions (Zalophus wollebaeki), and marine iguanas (Amblyrhynchus cristatus). While collecting fishes at Clipperton Island, Limbaugh (1963) noted that juvenile Galapagos sharks surrounded the boat, with multiple individuals rushing at virtually anything trailing in the water and striking the boat bottom, oars, and marker buoys. The sharks were not slowed by rotenone (a fish toxin) or shark repellent, and some followed the boat into water so shallow that their backs were exposed.

=== Life history ===
Like other requiem sharks, the Galapagos shark exhibits a viviparous mode of reproduction, in which the developing embryos are sustained by a placental connection formed from the depleted yolk sac. Females bear young once every 2–3 years. Mating takes place from January to March, at which time scars caused by male courtship bites appear on the females. The gestation period is estimated to be around one year; the spring following impregnation, females move into shallow nursery areas and give birth to 4–16 pups. The size at birth has been reported to be 61–80 cm (2.00–2.62 ft), though observations of free-swimming juveniles as small as 57 cm (1.87 ft) long in the eastern Pacific suggest that birth size varies geographically. Juvenile sharks remain in shallow water to avoid predation by larger adults. Males mature at 2.1–2.5 m (6.9–8.2 ft) long and 6–8 years old, while females mature at 2.2–2.5 m (7.2–8.2 ft) long and 7–9 years old. Neither sex is thought to reproduce until 10 years of age. The lifespan of this species is at least 24 years.

== Human interactions ==
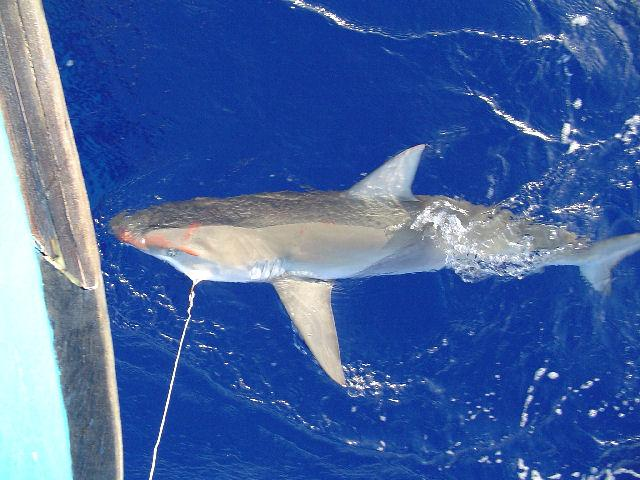
Galapagos shark hooked on a longline off Hawaii

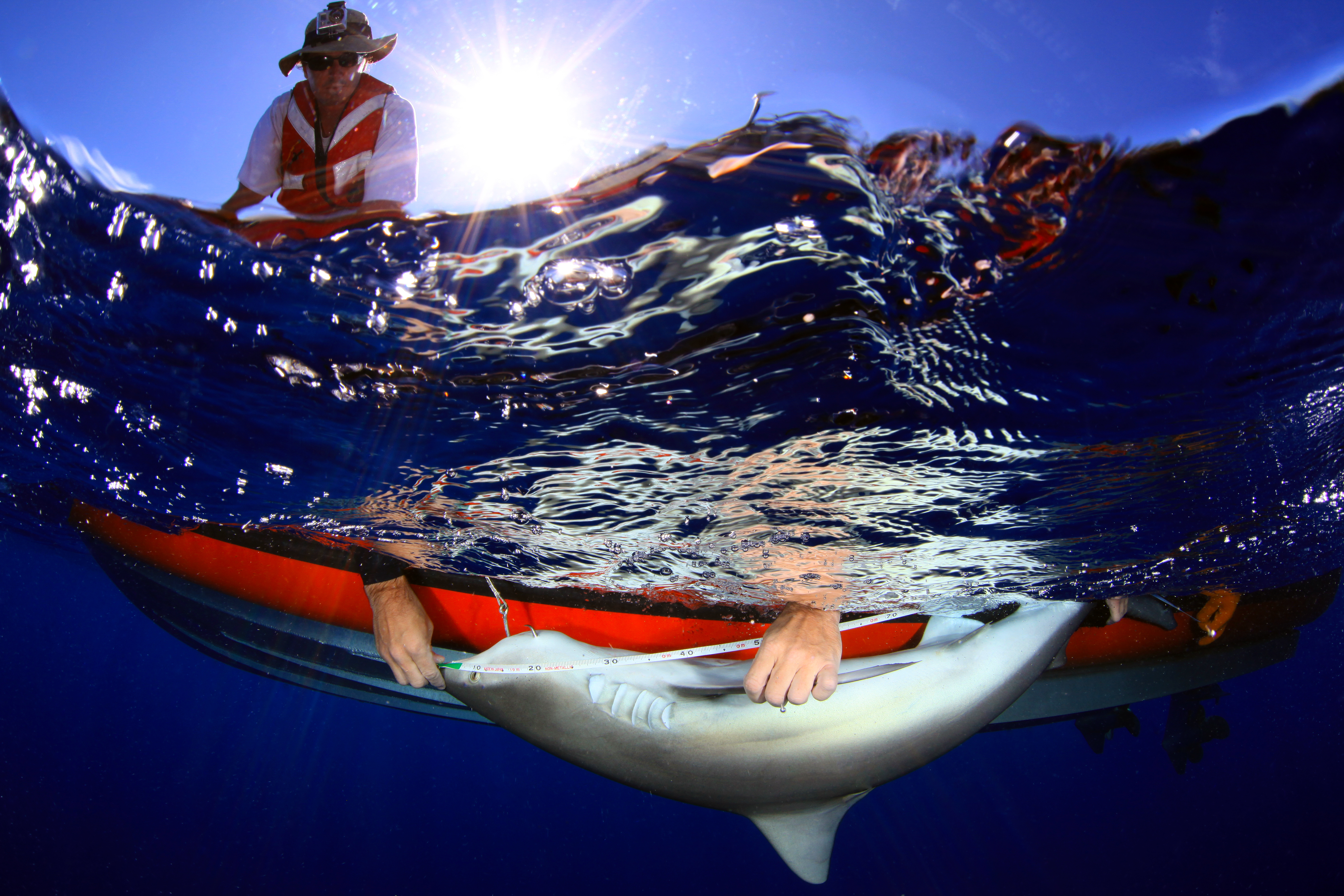
Galapagos shark being tagged by researchers in the Papahānaumokuākea Marine National Monument

Inquisitive and persistent. However, several live-aboard boats take divers to Wolf and Darwin, the northernmost Galapagos islands, every week specifically to dive in open water with these sharks where they and the scalloped hammerheads accumulate in numbers, and only a few incidents have been reported. They are known to approach close to swimmers, showing interest in swim fins or hands, and are drawn in large numbers by fishing activities. Fitzroy (1839) observed off St. Paul's Rocks that "as soon as a fish was caught, a rush of voracious sharks was made at him, notwithstanding blows of oars and boat hooks, the ravenous monsters could not be deterred from seizing and taking away more than half the fish that were hooked". Limbaugh (1963) reported that at Clipperton Island "at first, the small sharks circled at a distance, but gradually they approached and became more aggressive ... various popular methods for repelling sharks proved unsuccessful". The situation eventually escalated to the point at which the divers had to retreat from the water. Excited Galapagos sharks are not easily deterred; driving one away physically results only in the shark circling back while inciting others to follow, whereas using weapons against them could trigger a feeding frenzy.

As of 2008, the Galapagos shark has been confirmed to have attacked two people: one fatal attack in the United States Virgin Islands, at Magens Bay on the north shore of St. Thomas; and a second non-fatal, attack off Bermuda. February 2018 saw a non-fatal shark attack in the Galapagos islands that shark photographer Jeremy Stafford-Deitsch suggested may have been carried out by a Galapagos shark, but the species remains unconfirmed.

The International Union for Conservation of Nature (IUCN) has assessed the Galapagos shark as least concern, but its low reproductive rate limits its capacity to withstand population depletion. There is no specific utilization data available, though this species is certainly caught by commercial fisheries operating across many parts of its range. The meat is said to be of excellent quality. While still common at areas such as Hawaii, the Galapagos shark may have been extirpated from sites around Central America and its fragmented distribution means other regional populations may also be at risk. The populations at the Kermadec and Galapagos Islands are protected within marine reserves.

== Conservation status ==
The New Zealand Department of Conservation has classified the Galapagos shark as "Not Threatened" under the New Zealand Threat Classification System with the qualifiers "Conservation Dependent" and "Secure Overseas".
