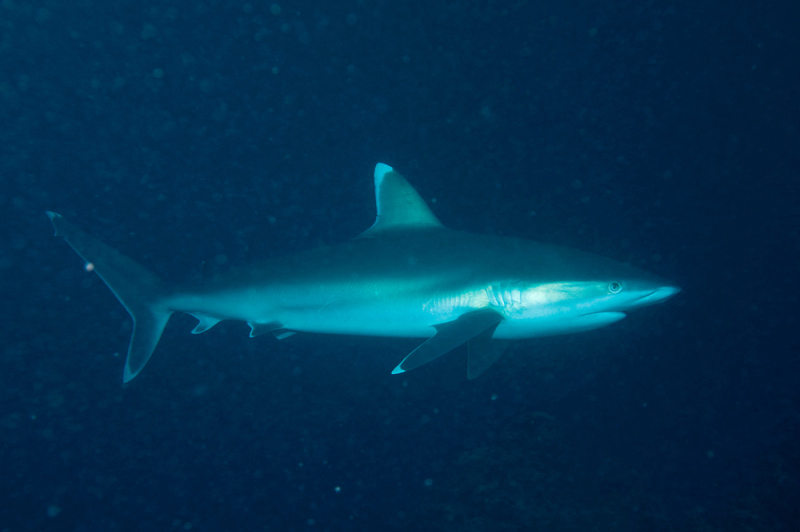

Conservation status
- Vulnerable (IUCN 3.1)

Scientific classification
- Kingdom: Animalia
- Phylum: Chordata
- Class: Chondrichthyes
- Subclass: Elasmobranchii
- Division: Selachii
- Order: Carcharhiniformes
- Family: Carcharhinidae
- Genus: Carcharhinus
- Species: C. albimarginatus

Binomial name
- Carcharhinus albimarginatus (Rüppell, 1837)
- Range of the silvertip shark

Synonyms
- Carcharias albimarginatus Rüppell, 1837; Eulamia platyrhynchus Gilbert, 1892

= Silvertip shark =

Silvertip shark Temporal range: 12.3–0 Ma

The silvertip shark (Carcharhinus albimarginatus) is a large species of requiem shark in the family carcharhinidae, with a fragmented distribution throughout the tropical Indian and Pacific Oceans. It is often encountered around offshore islands and coral reefs, and has been known to dive to a depth of 800 m (2,600 ft). The silvertip shark resembles a larger and bulkier grey reef shark (C. amblyrhynchos), but can be easily identified by the prominent white margins on its fins. It attains a maximum length of 3 m (10 ft).

It feeds on a wide variety of bony fishes, as well as eagle rays, smaller sharks, and cephalopods. This species dominates other requiem sharks of equal size when competing for food, and larger individuals are often heavily scarred from conflicts with others of its species. As with other members of its family, the silvertip shark is viviparous, with females giving birth to one to 11 pups in the summer. Silvertip sharks are regarded as potentially dangerous to humans, as they often approach divers quite closely. This slow-reproducing species is taken by commercial fisheries for its meat, fins, skin, cartilage, and jaws and teeth, which has apparently led to local population declines or extirpations.

== Taxonomy and phylogeny ==
The silvertip shark was originally described as Carcharias albimarginatus by German naturalist Eduard Rüppell, in the 1837 Fische des Rothen Meeres (Fishes of the Red Sea). The name was later changed to the currently valid Carcharhinus albimarginatus. The specific epithet is derived from the Latin albi meaning "white", and marginatus meaning "to enclose with a border", in reference to the distinct white fin margins. In 1960, a 103 cm (3.38 ft)-long immature male caught off Ras Muhammad in the Red Sea was designated as the type specimen. Based on similarities in morphology, tooth shape, and vertebral characters, Garrick (1982) proposed the grey reef shark as the closest relative of the silvertip shark. This interpretation was corroborated by Lavery (1992), based on allozyme data.

The earliest fossil record of the silvertip shark are fossil teeth from the Middle Miocene of Chile. They are also known from Late Miocene and Early Pliocene of Chile and Ecuador, including the La Portada Formation and the Bahia Inglesa Formation of Chile.

== Distribution and habitat ==
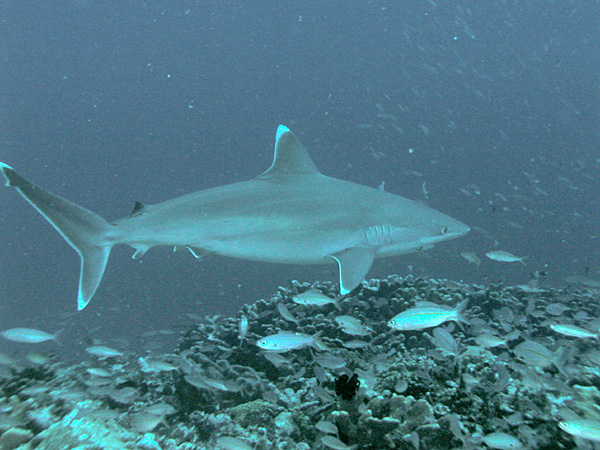
Silvertip sharks are most often found on or near coral reefs.

The silvertip shark is widely but not continuously distributed in the tropical Indian and Pacific Oceans. In the western Indian Ocean, this species occurs from the Red Sea to South Africa, including Madagascar, the Seychelles, the Aldabra Group, Mauritius and the Chagos Archipelago. In the western Pacific, it is known from off southern Japan to northern Australia, including Taiwan, the Philippines, Indonesia, Papua New Guinea, New Caledonia, Guam, Palau, the Solomon Islands, the Marshall Islands, the Phoenix Islands and Tahiti. In the eastern Pacific, it occurs from southern Baja California to Colombia, including the Cocos, Galapagos, and Revillagigedo Islands. Its presence in the Gulf of Mexico and the Caribbean Sea is unconfirmed.

Silvertip sharks are found over continental and insular shelves at a depth of 30–800 m (98–2,625 ft), occupying all levels of the water column. They are most common around isolated islands, coral banks, and reef drop-offs. Juveniles frequent coastal shallows or lagoons, while adults occur in deeper water, with little overlap between the two age groups.

== Description ==
The silvertip shark is a robust and streamlined species with a moderately long, broad snout and large, round eyes. The five pairs of gill slits are short. It has 12–14 tooth rows on each side of both jaws, with one or two small teeth at the symphysis (middle of the jaws). The upper teeth are broad with oblique triangular cusps and coarse serrations near the base; the lower teeth have erect cusps with fine serrations. The first dorsal fin is large and triangular, originating above or slightly forward of the free pectoral fin tips. A ridge occurs between the first and second dorsal fins. The pectoral fins are proportionately longer than in most requiem sharks and falcate (sickle-like) in shape, with pointed tips.

The coloration is blue-gray above with a bronze sheen, and white below. A subtle white band runs along the sides, with distinctive white tips and borders on all fins. Silvertip sharks can grow up to 3 m (9.8 ft) long, but typically measure 2.0–2.5 m (6.6–8.2 ft) in length. The maximum reported weight is 162.2 kg (358 lb). Females are larger than males.

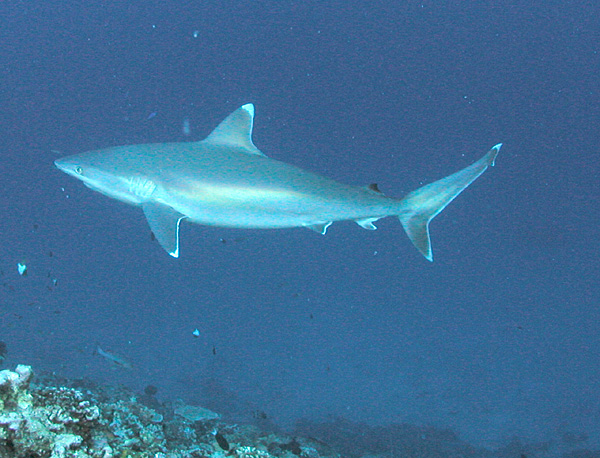
The silvertip shark can be recognized by its white-edged fins.

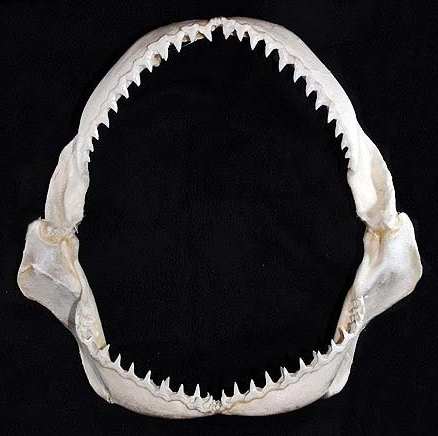
Jaws

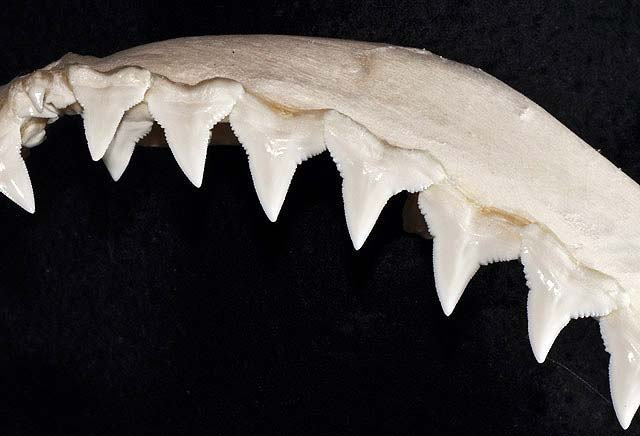
Upper teeth

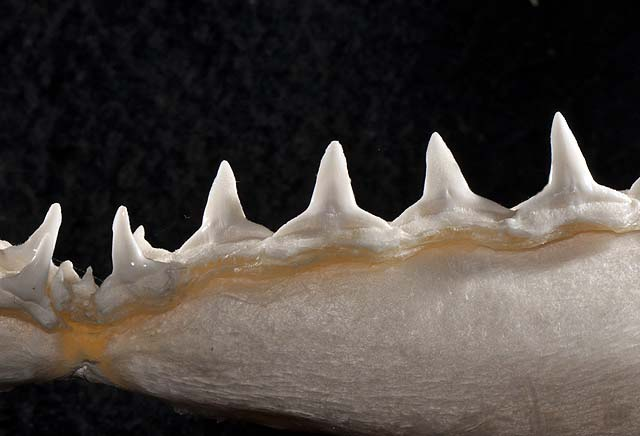
Lower teeth

== Biology and ecology ==
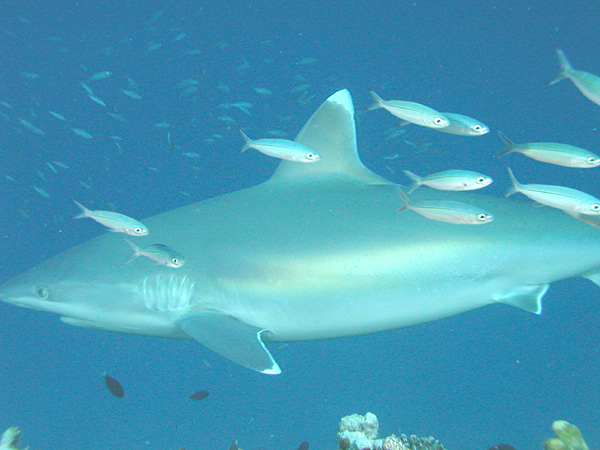
A silvertip shark at New Hanover Island, Papua New Guinea - individual sharks usually stay at particular reefs.

Though silvertip sharks are quite mobile, they exhibit fidelity to certain areas, with reports of territorial behavior. They are usually encountered alone or in pairs. Small groups of adult females have been seen in deep water. Individual silvertip sharks behave very aggressively towards one another, and many are heavily scarred. They are also reported to dominate Galapagos sharks (C. galapagensis) and blacktip sharks (C. limbatus) of equal size when competing for food. This shark sometimes forms mixed-species aggregations with grey reef sharks. Rainbow runners (Elagatis bipinnulata) have been observed rubbing against silvertip sharks, using the sharks' rough skin to scrape off parasites. They sometimes follow marine mammals such as bottlenose dolphins (Tursiops sp.) in open water, and are themselves followed by pilot fish (Naucrates ductor).

Like the grey reef shark, the silvertip shark sometimes perform a stereotypical threat display if pursued by divers, warning that it is prepared to attack. The display begins with the shark accelerating away to a distance of 15 m (49 ft), before turning and charging towards the perceived threat. At a distance of two body lengths, the shark brakes, turns broadside, drops its pectoral fins, gapes its jaws, lowers the posterior two-thirds of its body, and "shivers". The last two elements of this display are unique to this species; the "shivering" may serve to emphasize its white fin markings. If the diver persists, the shark may rapidly close in and slash with its upper teeth.

=== Feeding ===
The diet of the silvertip shark consists primarily of bony fishes, such as grouper, mackerel, tuna, bonito, lanternfish, flyingfish, escolar, bananafish, wahoo, wrasses, and soles. Eagle rays, smaller sharks, octopus, and squid are occasionally taken. Larger sharks tend to be more sluggish and take more benthic prey. The differently shaped dentition in their upper and lower jaws allows them to tackle large prey, gripping and sawing off chunks of flesh with violent twists and turns. Silvertip sharks have been observed swimming around the periphery of groups of feeding sharks of other species, occasionally dashing in to steal food. This species often approaches ships, as they are attracted to certain artificial, low-frequency sounds.

=== Life history ===
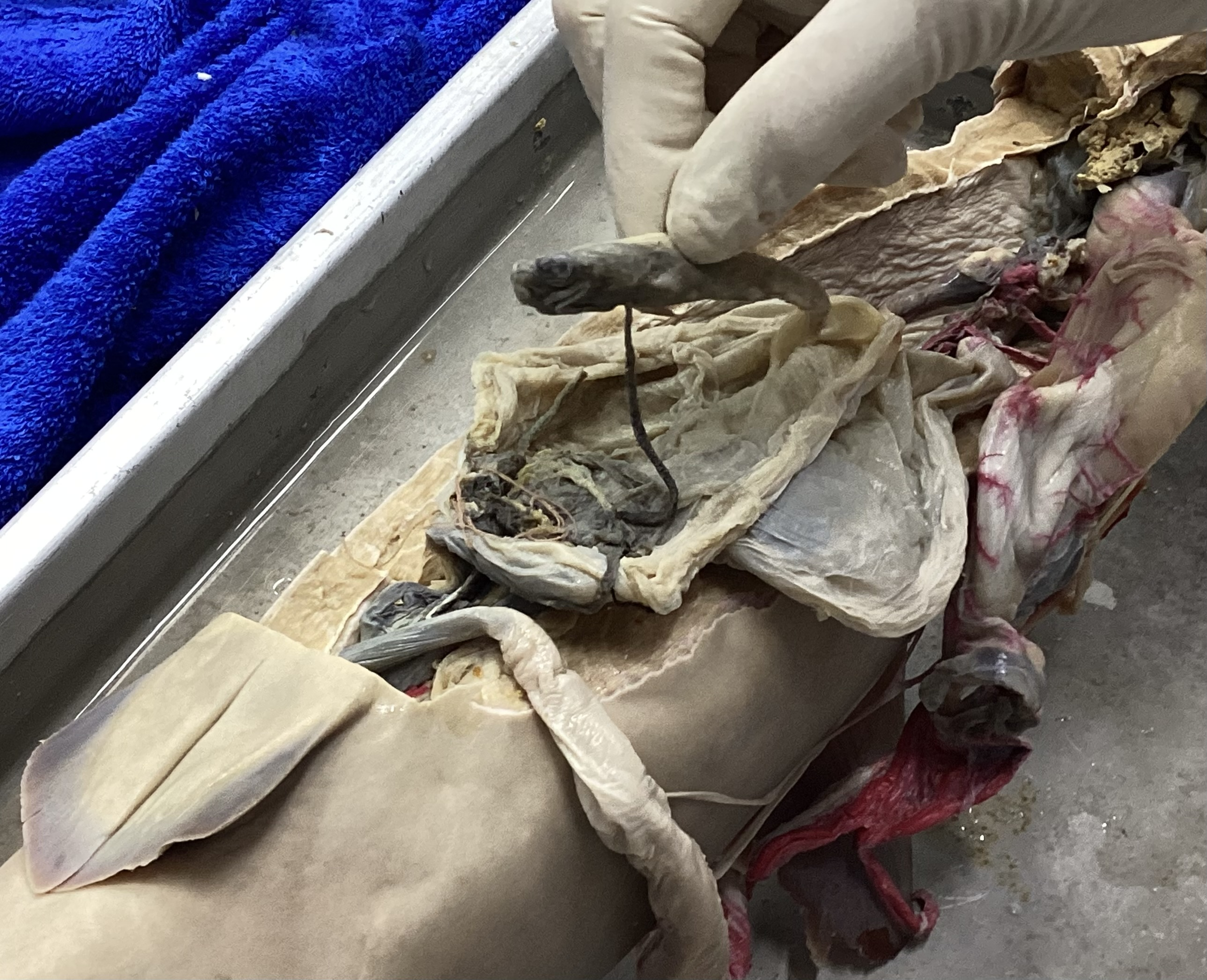
Uterus, placenta and fetus of a silvertip shark

Like other requiem sharks, the silvertip shark is viviparous; once the embryos exhaust their supply of yolk, the depleted yolk sac develops into a placental connection through which the mother delivers nourishment. In the Southern Hemisphere, mating and parturition both occur in summer. Courtship involves the male biting the female to hold her for copulation; one female observed had the tip of her first dorsal fin bitten off from such activity. Females bear litters of one to 11 (usually five or six) young after a gestation period of about one year, on a biennial cycle. The newborns have been reported to measure 63–68 cm (25–27 in) and 73–81 cm (29–32 in) long by different authors, and are found in shallower water than adults. The growth rate is highly variable in the wild: Kato and Hernandez (1967) reported juvenile silvertip sharks grow an average of 3.8 cm (1.5 in), or 5.3% of their body length, per year, with some individuals growing as much as 20.8 cm (8.2 in), 30.1% of their body length) per year and others showing negative "growth". Males have been reported to be sexually mature at 1.6–1.8 m (5.2–5.9 ft) or 1.9–2.0 m (6.2–6.6 ft) long, and females at 1.6–2.0 m (5.2–6.6 ft) long.

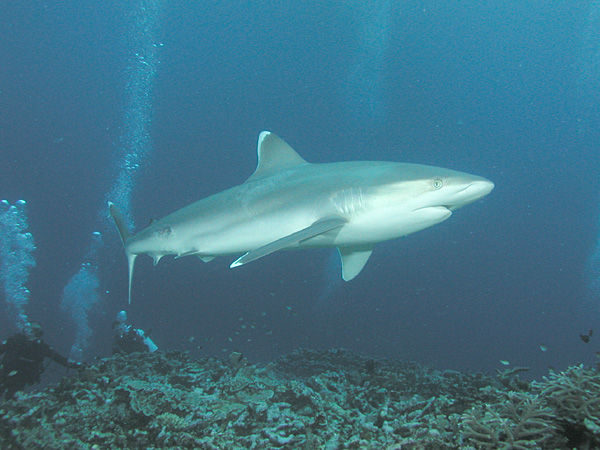
Silvertip sharks often behave boldly towards divers.

== Interactions with humans ==
Inquisitive and bold, especially in the presence of food several sharks will rush up from deep water to inspect divers when they first enter the water, which can be a very intimidating experience, as they may approach quite close. This species has also been known to circle or pursue divers. In one experiment involving bait, a large silvertip shark tore the leg off a dummy dressed in SCUBA gear, demonstrating that this species is capable of inflicting lethal injuries. As of 2008, the International Shark Attack File listed four provoked attacks attributable to this species, none of them were fatal.

The silvertip shark is caught by commercial and artisan fisheries across its range using longlines, gillnets, and trawls, both intentionally and as bycatch. The fins are highly valued for shark fin soup and are sold on the export market, along with the skin and cartilage. The meat is marketed locally, fresh or dried and salted, as are the jaws and teeth. Silvertip sharks are known to be taken by fisheries in Indonesia, Myanmar, and the Philippines, as well as by various Indian Ocean nations with coral reef fisheries; it is also an increasingly important catch of pelagic fisheries, where it is often finned at sea. This species is susceptible to overfishing, due to its slow reproductive rate and tendency to stay in a certain area. It is believed to have been extirpated by Indonesian artisan fishers at Scott Reef off northern Australia, and is likely becoming rare in many other parts of its range. As a result, the International Union for Conservation of Nature has assessed the silvertip shark as vulnerable.
