= Shark agonistic display =

Animal behavior

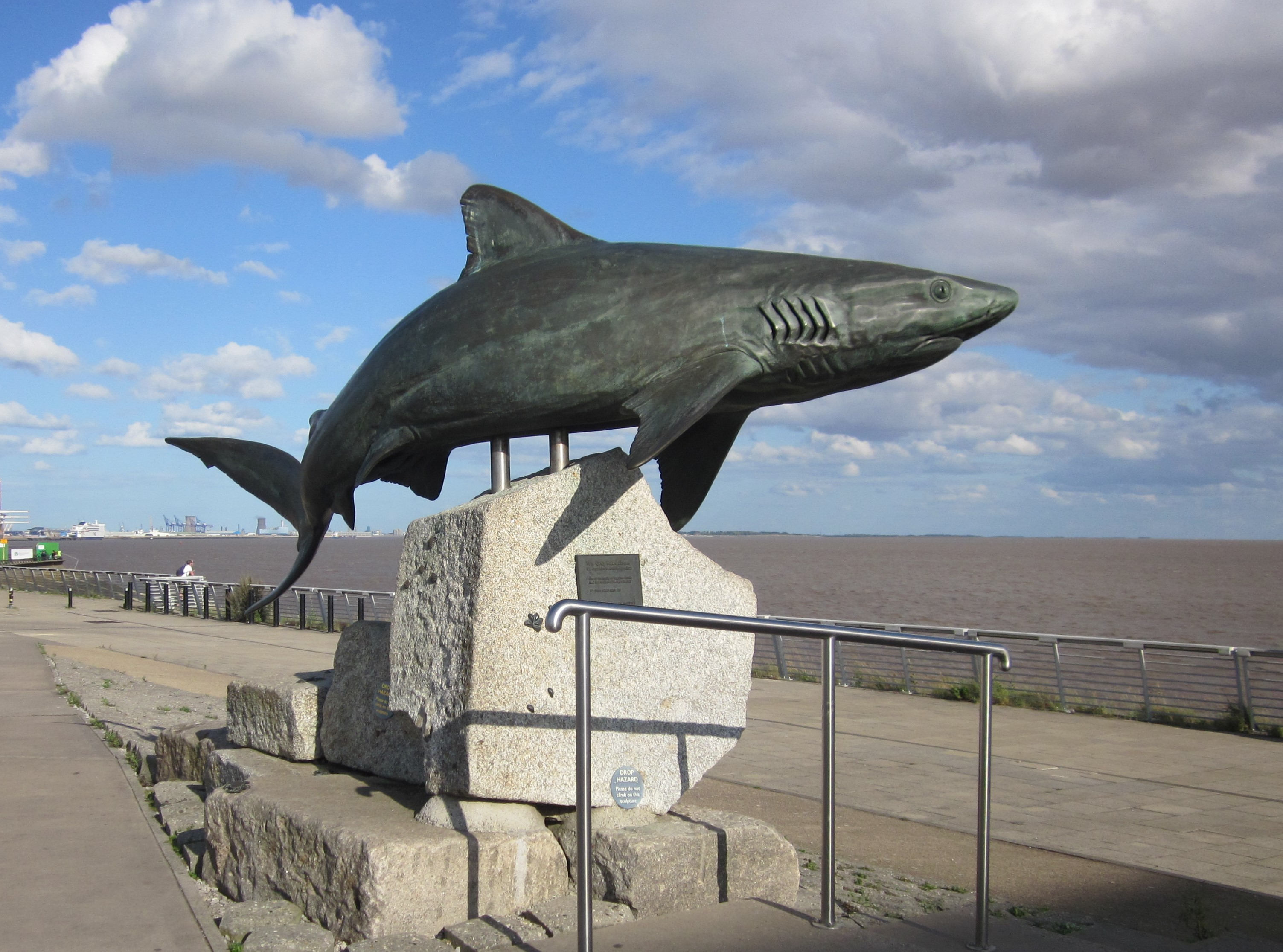
Postural configuration of a Gray Reef Shark as it displays agonistic behaviour, in a sculpture

Agonism is a broad term which encompasses many behaviours that result from, or are triggered by biological conflict between competing organisms. It is defined as "survivalist animal behaviour that includes aggression, defense, and avoidance". Approximately 23 shark species are capable of producing such displays when threatened by intraspecific or interspecific competitors, as an evolutionary strategy to avoid unnecessary combat. The behavioural, postural, social and kinetic elements which comprise this complex, ritualized display can be easily distinguished from normal, or non-display behaviour, considered typical of that species' life history. The display itself confers pertinent information to the foe regarding the displayer's physical fitness, body size, inborn biological weaponry, confidence and determination to fight. This behaviour is advantageous because it is much less biologically taxing for an individual to display its intention to fight than the injuries it would sustain during conflict. Agonistic displays are essential to the social dynamics of many biological taxa, extending far beyond sharks.

== Characteristics ==
=== Definition ===
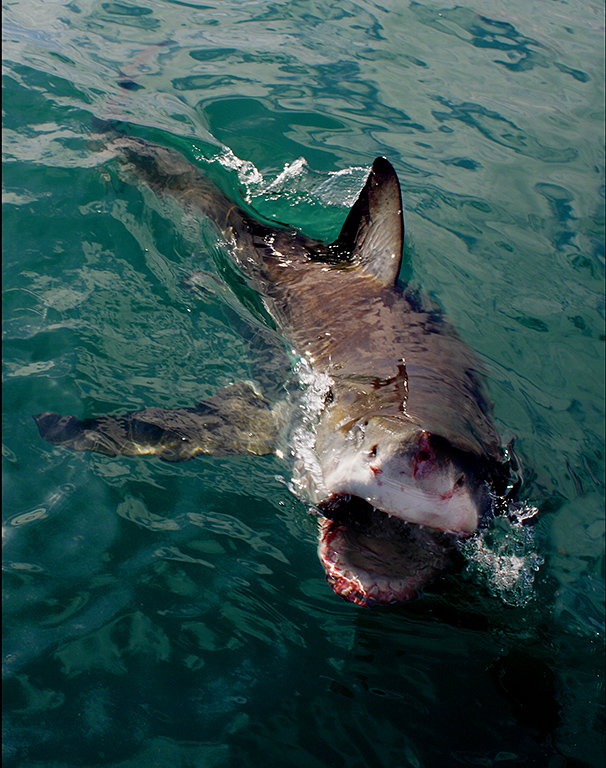
Clear agonistic behaviour observed in Great White Shark

Postural elements of the agonistic display of the Gray Reef Shark

Agonistic displays are ritualized sequences of actions, produced by animals belonging to almost all biological taxa, in response to conflict with other organisms. If challenged or threatened, animals may employ a suite of adaptive behaviours, which are used to reinforce the chances of their own survival. Behaviours which arise from agonistic conflict include:

- fight or flight response
- threat display to warn competitors and signal honest intentions
- defence behaviour
- simulated paralysis
- avoidance behaviour
- withdrawal
- settling behaviour.

Each of these listed strategies constitute some manifestation of agonistic behaviour, and have been observed in numerous shark species, among many higher taxa in Kingdom Animalia. Displays of this nature are influenced and reinforced by natural selection, as an optimal strategy for avoiding physical conflict, and the costs of such interactions. In nature, agonistic behaviour is both species and situation-specific, and is often expressed as a graded response to imposed threats.

=== Triggers ===
The most effective triggers of agonistic behaviour in sharks include:

- hunger
- crowding by human divers (independent or group dives) and submersible machinery
- sustained targeted pursuit
- invasion of the shark's idiosphere, without appropriate warning or consent
- natural competition for resources with other organisms
- obstructions on the benthic floor which block escape routes or reduce scope of visibility
- crowding by boats.

The intensity and duration of the resulting display graded in proportion to the shark's perceived degree of endangerment during the conflict.

=== Physical characteristics ===
Apart from species which incorporate unique elements into their display, a typical threat display will include the following four postural elements: elevated snout, pectoral fin depression, arching of the back, and lateral flexing of the body to display total size, and two locomotory elements: jerky side-to-side movements and rolling or spiral looping in the water column. There are always exceptions to this rule. Certain species will display unique visual cues, outside of the displays discussed here, as individual species face their own biological stresses that drive the selection and reinforcement of new adaptive behaviours.

Outside the typical display, certain species have been reported displaying the following behaviours as part of a species-specific display:

- stiff posture
- tail flexure
- tail depression
- head shaking
- jaw gaping
- ritualistic jaw snapping
- open jaw tooth raking
- gill pouch billowing
- torso thrusting
- clasper flexion
- tail slapping
- flank displaying
- body shivering
- reduced swimming efficiency
- charging
- ramming with snout
- rapid withdrawal from threat

Regardless of the precise sequence, agonistic displays function as accurate, predictive warnings to competitors which communicate a willingness to engage in more intense behaviour, if further provoked. Displays of this nature will always either result in a fleeing behaviour, or rapid, slashing attack from the displaying individual.

=== Characteristics of normal behaviour ===
To recognize and identify true agonistic behaviour, it is first important to understand what constitutes normal behaviour in sharks, specific to the lifestyle of the species of interest. For sharks, normal behaviour is considerably different than the exaggerated appearance of the agonistic display. A shark which is in distress will behave in a manner that is easily recognizable, due to the sheer oddity of the sequence of movements and torsional elements characteristic of agonistic displays - juxtaposed to normal behaviour, which appears visibly more relaxed and natural.

The following table summarizes the characteristic physical elements of sharks displaying agonistic behaviour and non-displaying sharks:

Table 1: Comparison of postural and kinematic elements of sharks exhibiting both normal and agonistic behaviour
Behavioural Display	Postural Elements	Kinetic Elements
Non-displaying shark	Relaxed; Body faces a single direction; Pectoral fins positioned perpendicular to the body, and both project horizontally outwards	Moving in a single direction at a comfortable pace; Pectoral fins can be flexed or depressed, depending on the direction of steering
Displaying shark: Displays are graded proportionally in response to the perceived severity of the threat or conflict	Hunched, tense posture; Arched back; Raised snout; Exaggerated, bilateral depression of both pectoral fins; Contorted posture; Gill billowing; Jaw gaping	Jerky, rapid movements; Exaggerated swimming patterns; Body rolling or spiral looping; Stiff movements

=== Evolutionary relevance ===
As an apex predator, sharks are no stranger to biological conflict. To successfully hunt and kill prey, sharks regularly encounter competing conspecific and heterospecific individuals, each willing to fight them to earn dominion over the meal, which in itself is a rare, valuable resource. As part of any biological conflict, natural instinct dictates that the shark fights to outcompete their competitors, or to subdue prey. In the past, combat was the sole means to determine which competing organism attained dominion over valuable resources, including access to prey, territory and reproductive partners. During combat, however, animals are highly susceptible to injury which significantly reduces overall and reproductive fitness. Sustained injuries impede each individual's ability to perform necessary biological functions, including foraging, courtship and mating behaviour. Thus, given the maladaptive nature of physical combat, animals have since developed refined methods to communicate their intent and willingness to fight, as a strategy to evade suffering the costs of physical combat.

Through the process of ritualization, the initial sequences of the animal's fighting behaviour, referred to as intention movements, are received by other animals as sign stimuli that the signaller is ready to fight. Through evolutionary time, sharks specifically have developed a suite of adaptive agonistic behaviours to communicate their intentions during such conflict. Sharks display recognizable sequences of behaviour, which mimic the initial phases of their fight sequence, to signal their degree of agitation, along with their intent to fight. The stereotyped postures and movements displayed by the shark are subsequently interpreted by competing organisms as honest, predictive signals of their level of commitment.

Producing the agonistic display incurs very slight costs for the displaying organism, but are performed nevertheless, as they mitigate the potential risks of sustaining a life-threatening injuries in combat. Instead of fleeing or attacking the competitor, a displaying organism sacrifices its competitive edge to perform the display, to warn and hopefully deter the challenger. If the displaying organism is larger or more robust than its competitor, the display would save it from having to fight to prove its dominance. The smaller opponent would withdraw after recognizing its own inadequacies during this short display period, and retreat from the dominant opponent. In this sense, displays are evolutionarily beneficial as they cost very little in the grand-scheme, but maintain the potential benefit of not sustaining life-threatening injuries during combat, which would negatively impact the organism's fitness.

The following is a summary of the costs and benefits attributed to shark threat displays in comparison to mounting a physical attack as a primary response to natural conflict:

Table 2: Summary of costs and benefits incurred by sharks performing agonistic behavioural displays in place of mounting a physical attack
Response to Conflict with Another Organism	Costs	Benefits
Agonistic display	Reduced speed and motility while swimming; Reduces energetic efficiency, since the display is costly; Displaying might put the shark at risk, if this comes at the cost of a potential escape; If opponent is not intimidated by the display, they might stay and harm the shark; Shark sacrifices the chance to escape by performing display as an intimidation tactic; Costs of display are real, while the potential benefits of displaying are only a possibility rather than a guarantee	An agonistic display could potentially eliminate the need to engage in physical combat; Avoiding conflict is much less risky than engaging in conflict, and is the optimal outcome (having one animal become intimidated to the point of retreat)
Physical attack	Shark may sustain life-threatening injuries that have severe health consequences; Injuries greatly reduce individual fitness and physical ability; Cost of under-estimating the opponent's fighting ability could be lethal	Animal may gain independent rights to some valued resource (i.e. territory, mate, food item); Experiencing a victory increases the likelihood of future victories; Gained tactical fighting experience

== Case studies ==
=== Gray reef shark ===
Available literature suggests that the standardized threat display has been observed and appropriately documented in many shark species. Additionally, some express dissimilar behavioural patterns, in a species-specific context. Of the described incidences where agonistic displays have been observed, the gray reef shark is the most commonly reported, as they hold a reputation for having a very exaggerated, recognizable display, which incorporates all of the most commonly reported physical and dynamic elements. Thus, gray reef sharks are often selected as model organisms to describe incidences of agonistic behaviour in sharks, as theirs is the most visually distinctive, providing a near perfect representation of the behaviour.

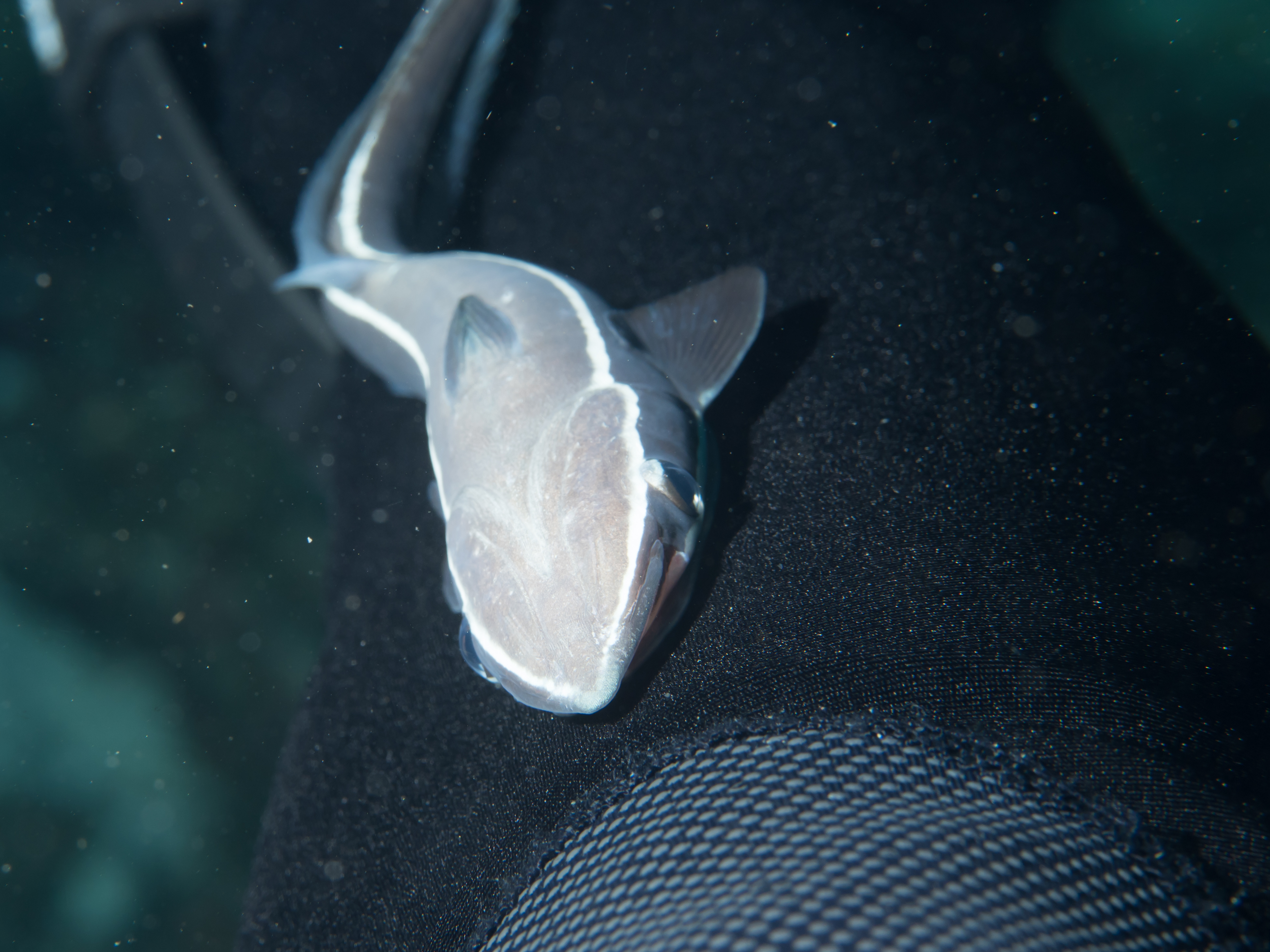
Sharksucker (Echeneis naucrates)

=== Sharksucker-induced agonistic pseudodisplays ===
By definition, pseudodisplays of aggression are apparent physical displays that closely resemble agonistic behaviour patterns elicited in response to conflict, but are not themselves produced as a result of conflict. While the visual cues performed during the pseudodisplay appear visually similar to the genuine agonistic display, sharks only exhibit the true elements of this display in response to biological conflict. The overlapping kinetic and postural elements of the pseudodisplay and the typical agonistic display include twitching, shaking, body rolling, flexure or depression of pectoral and caudal fins, jaw gaping, and accelerated, jerky movements. Biologists and behavioural scientists often mistake one or more of these elements as part of their stereotyped threat display, when only a proportion of the observed instances truly are.

A significant number of displays are mistaken for the actions produced during attempts to lessen the irritation caused by sharksuckers (Echeneis naucrates) along the length of their body. Sharks are known to have sensitive skin, due to the high concentration of electroreceptors distributed across their face and body. For sharks, irritation is a regular occurrence when they spend as much time as they do being cleaned by sharsuckers. In recognition that the majority of behavioural elements exhibited during a genuine agonistic encounter overlap with those performed as part of the pseudodisplay, it is easy to understand how and why accurately differentiation between the two is a challenge.

Distribution of highly sensitive ampullae of Lorenzini across the shark's head and rostrum.

Sharks are extremely limited by their physiology, in the sense that the distribution of key appendages or structures limit overall flexibility and maneuverability, based solely on their apparent location on the body. As a result, sharks rely on a select few features to accomplish all necessary biological functions. Due to these limitations, the available appendages inherit multifunctional capabilities, and the shark can perform tasks this include signalling, swimming and removal of irritants, all with the same appendages and sequences of movement. Despite the inherent redundancy of their body plan, sharks are able to effectively communicate their intentions to nearby organisms, such as when they produce their agonistic display. However, due to the nature of this overlap in function, agonistic behaviour is often mistaken/misidentified as pseudodisplays, resulting from sharksucker-induced irritation. The very slight distinction between true agonistic behaviour and the irritation-borne pseudodisplay has historically, and will continue to confound scientists dedicated to this area of research, since the two are nearly indistinguishable from each other, at first glance.
