= Neofibularia nolitangere =

Scientific classification
- Kingdom: Animalia
- Phylum: Porifera
- Class: Demospongiae
- Order: Biemnida
- Family: Biemnidae
- Genus: Neofibularia
- Species: N. nolitangere

Binomial name
- Neofibularia nolitangere (Duchassaing & Michelotti, 1864)

Synonyms
- List: Amphimedon nolitangere Duchassaing & Michelotti, 1864; Fibularia massa Carter, 1882; Fibulia massa (Carter, 1882); Fibulia nolitangere (Duchassaing & Michelotti, 1864); Gellius massa (Carter, 1882); Neofibularia oxeata Hartman, 1967

Species of sponge

Neofibularia nolitangere, commonly known as the touch-me-not sponge, is a species of sea sponge in the family Biemnidae. It is found in shallow waters in the Western Atlantic Ocean and the Caribbean Sea.

== Description ==
Neofibularia nolitangere is a massive sponge often growing to about 30 centimetres (12 in) wide and 30 centimetres tall but sometimes reaching 1 metre (3 ft 3 in) in width. It has a central cavity or atrium with thick walls. It takes various forms in different areas of the Caribbean. In the Bahamas it usually occurs as a number of rounded lobes with a cup-shaped depression or cloaca on the apex of each. In these are several openings called osculi that slope diagonally to join the atrium and out of which water is propelled. Sometimes the sponge is encrusting, forming a shallow layer of tissue growing across the substrate. In other locations it grows as several concentric mounds with smaller cloacal openings or as large vase-type structures, single or in groups, sometimes fused together laterally. The general colour is deep brown or dark red. The inside surfaces of the cloaca are rougher than the outer surface of the sponge which is smooth but not shiny. The consistency of this sponge is compressible, fragile and crumbly, but handling it is unwise as it causes a smarting sensation and numbness of the skin. Repeated exposure to it can cause a more severe allergic reaction.

== Distribution ==
Neofibularia nolitangere is found in the Western Atlantic and the Caribbean Sea. Its range extends from Florida and the Bahamas to the Greater and Lesser Antilles and south to Panama, Colombia and Venezuela. The depth range is 3 to 46 metres (9.8 to 150.9 ft).

== Biology ==
Like other sponges, Neofibularia nolitangere is a filter feeder. Water is drawn in through small pores in the walls called ostia. These are lined by flagellated cells called choanocytes which move the water along. The bacteria-size food particles are engulfed by the choanocytes and slightly larger particles are captured by the narrow collars found where the ostia enter the atrium. The water exits through the oscula on the top surface of the sponge.

Neofibularia nolitangere has been observed to "smoke" as it releases a large number of sperm from the oscula. It is presumed from this that it reproduces sexually but little is known of its reproductive biology.

== Ecology ==
Parasitic polychaete worms, Haplosyllis spongicola, are frequently seen as small white shapes protruding from the inner cloaca walls. There may be tens of thousands of worms living in an individual sponge and they are sometimes so abundant that they make up five percent of its weight. Several species of fish are associated with this sponge. These include the gobies Elacatinus horsti and Elacatinus chancei which live inside its apertures and largely feed on the worm.
