= Biemna variantia =

Conservation status
- Secure (NatureServe)

Scientific classification
- Kingdom: Animalia
- Phylum: Porifera
- Class: Demospongiae
- Order: Biemnida
- Family: Biemnidae
- Genus: Biemna
- Species: B. variantia

Binomial name
- Biemna variantia (Bowerbank, 1858)

Synonyms
- List: Asychis variantia (Bowerbank, 1858); Biemna capillifera (Levinsen, 1887); Biemna gemmulifera (Breitfuss, 1912); Biemna groenlandica (Fristedt, 1887); Biemna hamifera (Lundbeck, 1902); Biemna peachii (Bowerbank, 1866); Desmacella capillifera (Levinsen, 1887); Desmacella groenlandica Fristedt, 1887; Desmacella hamifera Lundbeck, 1902; Desmacella peachii (Bowerbank, 1866); Desmacella variantia (Bowerbank, 1858); Desmacidon cavernula Bowerbank, 1874; Desmacidon korenii Schmidt, 1875; Desmacidon peachii Bowerbank, 1866; Gellius capillifer Levinsen, 1887; Gellius gemmuliferus Breitfuss, 1912; Halichondria variantia Bowerbank, 1858; Hymeniacidon varians Bowerbank, 1858; Hymeniacidon variantia (Bowerbank, 1858); Raphiodesma aculeatum Topsent, 1888

Species of sponge

Biemna variantia is a species of sponge in the family Biemnidae. It is native to the northwestern Atlantic Ocean, the northeastern Atlantic Ocean, the North Sea and the Mediterranean Sea. This species was first described in 1858 by the British naturalist James Scott Bowerbank, who gave it the name Halichondria variantia. It was later moved to the genus Biemna and is the type species of the genus. The type locality is Tenby, Wales.

== Description ==
Biemna variantia is an encrusting sponge forming small cushions seldom more than 8 cm (3 in) across, 1 to 2 cm (0.4 to 0.8 in) thick in the middle and thinner near the edge. The surface is covered with small conical peaks and has a spiky appearance due to spicule fibres which support the surface. The oscula are irregularly scattered across the surface. Sometimes the cushions are plate-like, cup or fan-shaped, and older individuals may have protuberances and appear lumpy or shaggy. The colour of this sponge is yellowish, beige or light brown, the texture is soft, and the tissues fragile and crumbly. It may be confused with Dysidea fragilis, but that species is whiter and lacks the megascleres and microscleres present in Biemna variantia.

== Distribution and habitat ==
Biemna variantia is found in the Arctic Ocean and northern Atlantic Ocean, from the Gulf of Saint Lawrence and Greenland to the Barents Sea and the North Sea. It is also known from the English Channel and as far south as Portugal, the Canary Islands and the Alboran Sea, at the western end of the Mediterranean Sea. It grows on vertical rock faces where there is moderate water movement, under boulders and on stones, gravel and mud, at depths varying from the intertidal zone to 1,600 m (5,200 ft). This sponge tolerates brackish water and is not uncommon in estuaries.

== Ecology ==
Like other sponges, Biemna variantia draws in water through small pores, filters out organic particles less than 3μm in diameter, and expels the water through the oscula; its diet consists mostly of bacteria, unicellular algae, and organic debris. The sponge is a hermaphrodite and can reproduce both sexually and asexually. Male and female gametes are produced at different times, so self-fertilisation does not occur. After fertilisation, the embryos are brooded inside the sponge, and when they reach the last embryonic stage, they pass out through the oscula into the water column. They drift with the plankton, and after a few days, they settle on the seabed, attach themselves to the substrate and become juvenile sponges. Asexual reproduction is via budding, or by fragmentation, a process that occurs when pieces of sponge become detached.
