= Yellow encrusting sponge =

Scientific classification
- Kingdom: Animalia
- Phylum: Porifera
- Class: Demospongiae
- Order: Biemnida
- Family: Biemnidae
- Genus: Biemna
- Species: B. anisotoxa

Binomial name
- Biemna anisotoxa Lévi, 1963

Species of sponge

The yellow encrusting sponge (Biemna anisotoxa) is a species of sea sponge in the family Biemnidae. This sponge is known from the west coast of South Africa to Port Elizabeth. It is endemic to this region.

== Description ==
The yellow encrusting sponge is beige-yellow and grows in crusts of up to 1 cm thick. It has small but distinct oscula which may be slightly raised from the surface of the sponge.

== Habitat ==
This sponge lives on rocky reefs and other hard surfaces from 10-12m.
