= Neofibularia =

Scientific classification
- Domain: Eukaryota
- Kingdom: Animalia
- Phylum: Porifera
- Class: Demospongiae
- Order: Biemnida
- Family: Biemnidae
- Genus: Neofibularia; Hechtel, 1965

Genus of sponges

Neofibularia is a genus of sponges belonging to the family Biemnidae.

The species of this genus are found in Australia and America.

Species:

- Neofibularia chinensis Pulitzer-Finali, 1982
- Neofibularia hartmani Hooper & Lévi, 1993
- Neofibularia irata Wilkinson, 1978
- Neofibularia mordens Hartman, 1967
- Neofibularia nolitangere (Duchassaing & Michelotti, 1864)
