= Rhabderemia =

Scientific classification
- Kingdom: Animalia
- Phylum: Porifera
- Class: Demospongiae
- Order: Biemnida
- Family: Rhabderemiidae
- Genus: Rhabderemia; Topsent, 1890

Genus of sponges

Rhabderemia is a genus of sponges belonging to the family Rhabderemiidae.

The species of this genus are found in Southern Hemisphere.

== Species ==
Species:

- Rhabderemia acanthostyla Thomas, 1968
- Rhabderemia africana van Soest & Hooper, 1993
- Rhabderemia antarctica van Soest & Hooper, 1993
