= Biemna =

Scientific classification
- Kingdom: Animalia
- Phylum: Porifera
- Class: Demospongiae
- Order: Biemnida
- Family: Biemnidae
- Genus: Biemna; Gray, 1867

Species
- see text

Synonyms
- List: Allantophora Whitelegge, 1907; Biemma Bowerbank, 1882 [lapsus]; Toxemma Laubenfels, 1936; Toxemna Hallmann, 1917

Genus of sponges

Biemna is a genus of sea sponges in the family Biemnidae.

== Species ==
The following species are recognised in the genus Biemna:

- Biemna anisotoxa Lévi, 1963
- Biemna bihamigera (Dendy, 1922)
- Biemna caribea Pulitzer-Finali, 1986
- Biemna chilensis Thiele, 1905
- Biemna chujaensis Sim & Shim, 2006
- Biemna ciocalyptoides (Dendy, 1897)
- Biemna cribaria (Alcolado & Gotera, 1986)
- Biemna dautzenbergi Topsent, 1890
- Biemna ehrenbergi (Keller, 1889)
- Biemna fistulosa (Topsent, 1897)
- Biemna flabellata Bergquist, 1970
- Biemna fortis (Topsent, 1897)
- Biemna fragilis (Kieschnick, 1900)
- Biemna gellioides Lévi & Lévi, 1989
- Biemna granulosigmata Lévi, 1993
- Biemna hongdoensis Jeon & Sim, 2008
- Biemna humilis Thiele, 1903
- Biemna jeolmyongensis Sim & Shim, 2006
- Biemna laboutei Hooper, 1996
- Biemna liposigma Burton, 1928
- Biemna liposphaera (Hentschel, 1912)
- Biemna macrorhaphis Hentschel, 1914
- Biemna megalosigma Hentschel, 1912
- Biemna megastyla (Burton, 1959)
- Biemna microacanthosigma Mothes, Hajdu, Lerner & van Soest, 2004
- Biemna microstrongyla (Hentschel, 1912)
- Biemna microstyla de Laubenfels, 1950
- Biemna microxa Hentschel, 1911
- Biemna mnioeis de Laubenfels, 1954
- Biemna novaezealandiae Dendy, 1924
- Biemna omanensis van Soest & Beglinger, 2002
- Biemna partenopea Pulitzer-Finali, 1978
- Biemna pedonculata Lévi, 1963
- Biemna peracuta Topsent, 1927
- Biemna plicata (Whitelegge, 1907)
- Biemna polyphylla Lévi, 1963
- Biemna rhabderemioides Bergquist, 1961
- Biemna rhabdostyla Uriz, 1988
- Biemna rhabdotylostylota Van Soest, 2017
- Biemna rhadia de Laubenfels, 1930
- Biemna rufescens Bergquist & Fromont, 1988
- Biemna saucia Hooper, Capon & Hodder, 1991
- Biemna seychellensis Thomas, 1973
- Biemna spinomicroxea Mothes, Campos, Lerner, Carraro & van Soest, 2005
- Biemna strongylota Rios & Cristobo, 2006
- Biemna tenuisigma Pulitzer-Finali, 1978
- Biemna tetraphis Tanita & Hoshino, 1989
- Biemna thielei Burton, 1930
- Biemna thomasi Cavalcanti, Santos Neto & Pinheiro, 2018
- Biemna trirhaphis (Topsent, 1897)
- Biemna trisigmata Mothes & Campos, 2004
- Biemna truncata Hentschel, 1912
- Biemna tubulata (Dendy, 1905)
- Biemna variantia (Bowerbank, 1858)
- Biemna victoriana Hallmann, 1916
