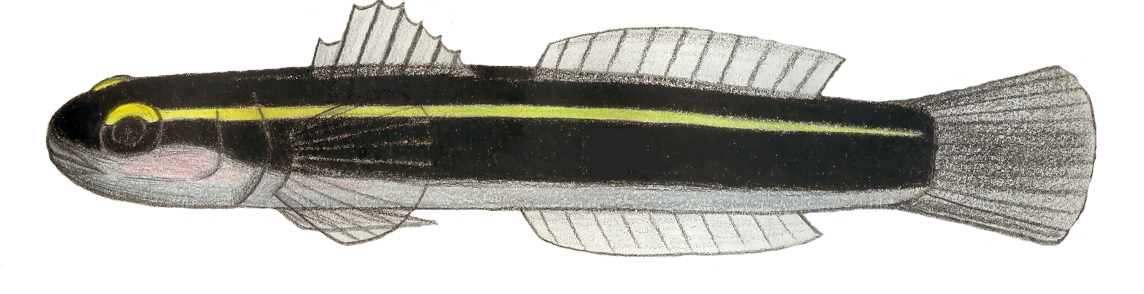

Conservation status
- Least Concern (IUCN 3.1)

Scientific classification
- Kingdom: Animalia
- Phylum: Chordata
- Class: Actinopterygii
- Order: Gobiiformes
- Family: Gobiidae
- Genus: Elacatinus
- Species: E. horsti

Binomial name
- Elacatinus horsti (Metzelaar, 1922)

Synonyms
- Gobiosoma horsti Metzelaar, 1922

= Elacatinus horsti =

Species of fish

Elacatinus horsti, the yellowline goby, is a species of goby native to the western Atlantic Ocean and the Caribbean Sea.

== Description ==
The yellowline goby grows to be 5 cm (2.0 in) in length. It has a rounded snout and a long, slim body. The upper parts are black and the underside is grey, gradually paling to white. Some fish have a bright, yellow stripes running along each side from the eye to the tail, with often a yellow spot or short line on the snout. In juvenile fish, this stripe is shorter and extends just beyond the base of the pectoral fin. Young Elacatinus chancei are very similar in appearance, but in that species, the yellow line hardly reaches the pectoral fin. In another form of the fish, the stripe is white, paling to a bluish-grey colour beyond the pectoral fin. The dorsal fin is in two parts, and has seven spines and 11 to 12 soft rays. The pectoral fin then has 18 rays and the anal fin has a single spine and 10 soft rays.

== Distribution ==
The yellowline goby is found on the Gulf Coast of the United States, the Gulf of Mexico, the Caribbean Sea, the Bahamas, Curaçao, and Panama. It is found on reefs at depths between 7 and 27 m (23 and 89 ft).

== Biology ==
The yellowline goby is always found living in association with a tubular sponge such as Verongia aerophoba or a massive sponge such as Neofibularia nolitangere and feeding on the parasitic worms Haplosyllis spongicola that live in large numbers on these sponges. It also eats other invertebrates that live on the seabed and plankton.

== Name ==
The specific name honours the Dutch biologist Cornelius van der Horst (1889–1951), who collected the type while staying on Curaçao in 1920.
