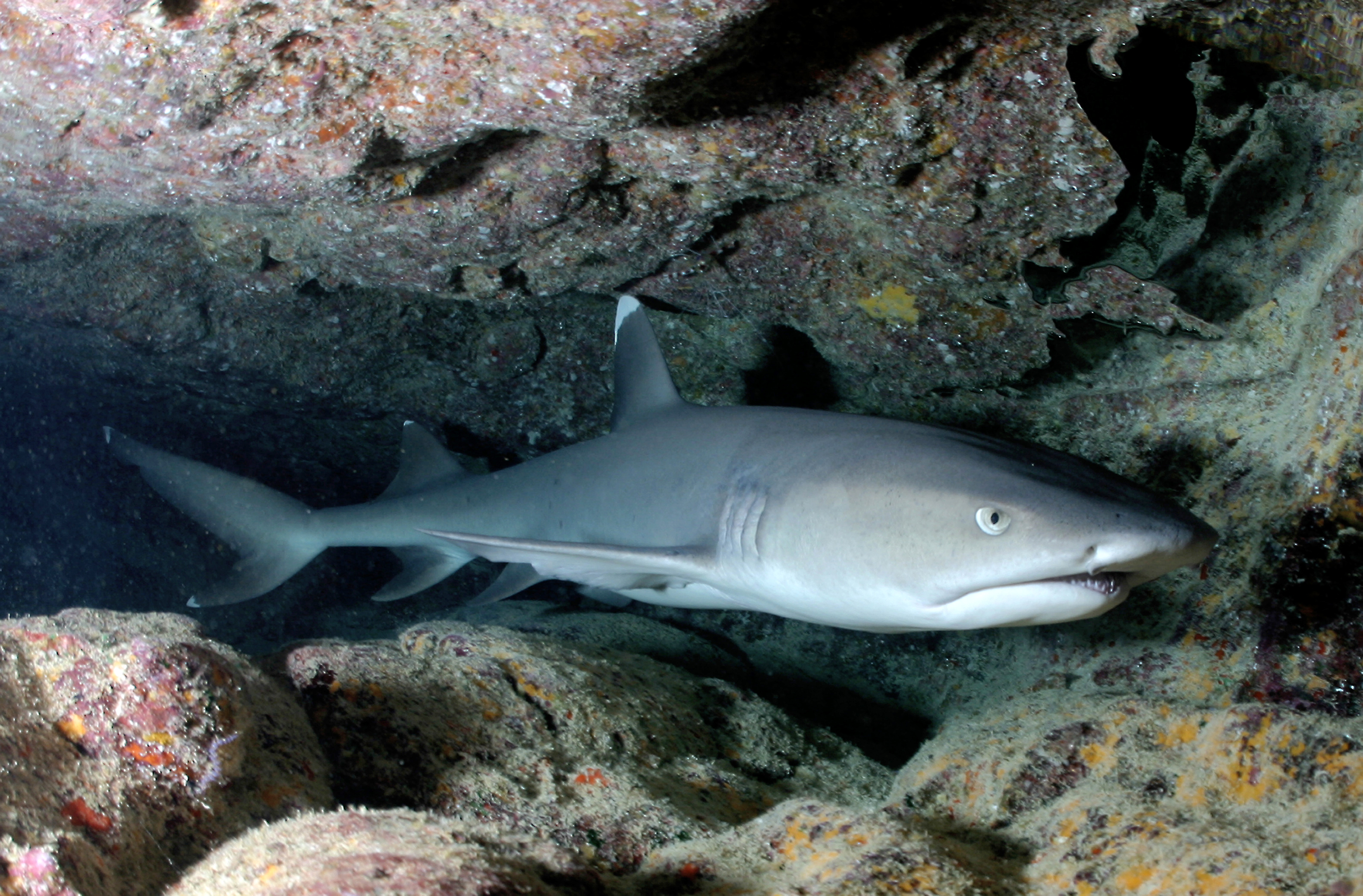

Conservation status
- Vulnerable (IUCN 3.1)

Scientific classification
- Kingdom: Animalia
- Phylum: Chordata
- Class: Chondrichthyes
- Subclass: Elasmobranchii
- Division: Selachii
- Order: Carcharhiniformes
- Family: Carcharhinidae
- Genus: Triaenodon; J. P. Müller & Henle, 1837
- Species: T. obesus

Binomial name
- Triaenodon obesus (Rüppell, 1837)
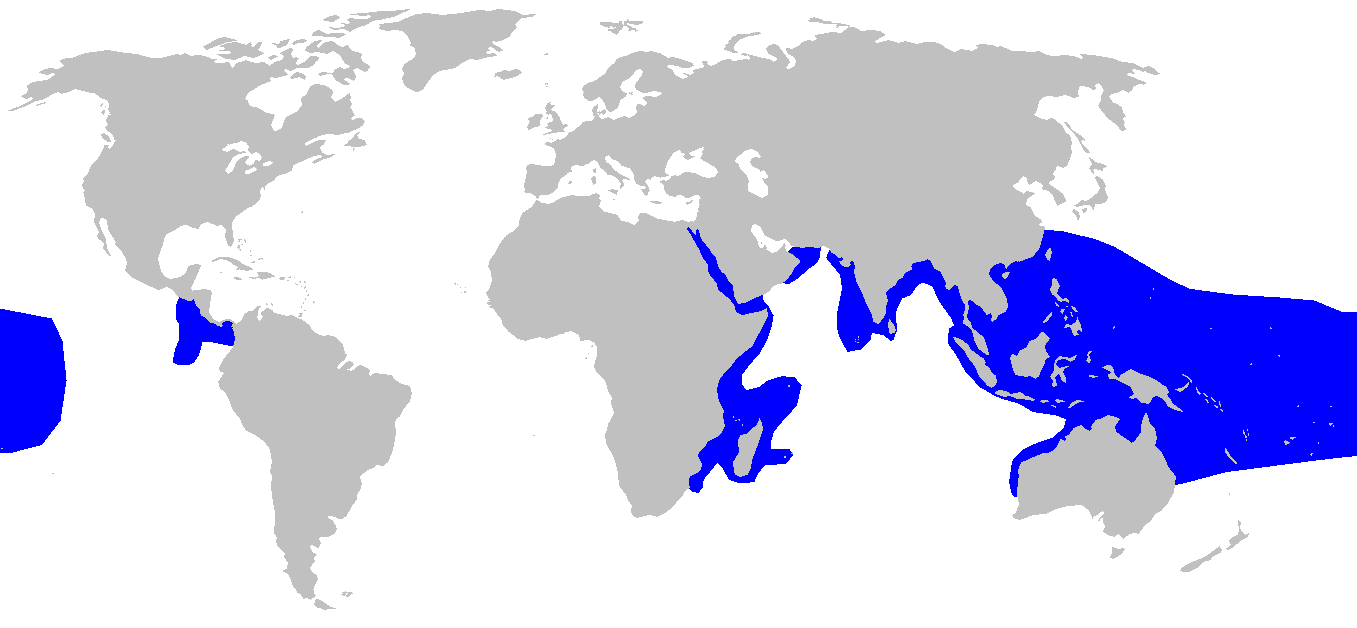
- Range of the whitetip reef shark

Synonyms
- Carcharias obesus Rüppell, 1837; Triaenodon apicalis Whitley, 1939

= Whitetip reef shark =

Species of shark

The whitetip reef shark (Triaenodon obesus) is a species of requiem shark, in the family Carcharhinidae. It is the only extant species of genus Triaenodon. A small shark that does not usually exceed 1.6 m (5.2 ft) in length, this species is easily recognizable by its slender body and short but broad head, as well as tubular skin flaps beside the nostrils, oval eyes with vertical pupils, and white-tipped dorsal and caudal fins. One of the most common sharks found on Indo-Pacific coral reefs, the whitetip reef shark occurs as far west as South Africa and as far east as Central America. It is typically found on or near the bottom in clear water, at a depth of 8–40 m (26–131 ft).

During the day, whitetip reef sharks spend much of their time resting inside caves. Unlike other requiem sharks, which rely on ram ventilation and must constantly swim to breathe, this shark can pump water over its gills and lie still on the bottom. At night, whitetip reef sharks emerge to hunt bony fishes, crustaceans, and octopus in groups, their elongate bodies allowing them to force their way into crevices and holes to extract hidden prey. Individuals may stay within a particular area of the reef for months or years, frequently returning to the same shelter. This species is viviparous, in which the developing embryos are sustained by a placental connection to their mother.

Whitetip reef sharks are rarely aggressive towards humans, though they may investigate swimmers closely. However, spear fishers are at risk of being bitten by one attempting to steal their catch. This species is caught for food, though ciguatera poisoning resulting from its consumption has been reported. The IUCN has assessed the whitetip reef shark as Vulnerable, noting its numbers are dwindling due to increasing levels of unregulated fishing activity across its range. The slow reproductive rate and limited habitat preferences of this species renders its populations vulnerable to overfishing.

== Taxonomy and phylogeny ==
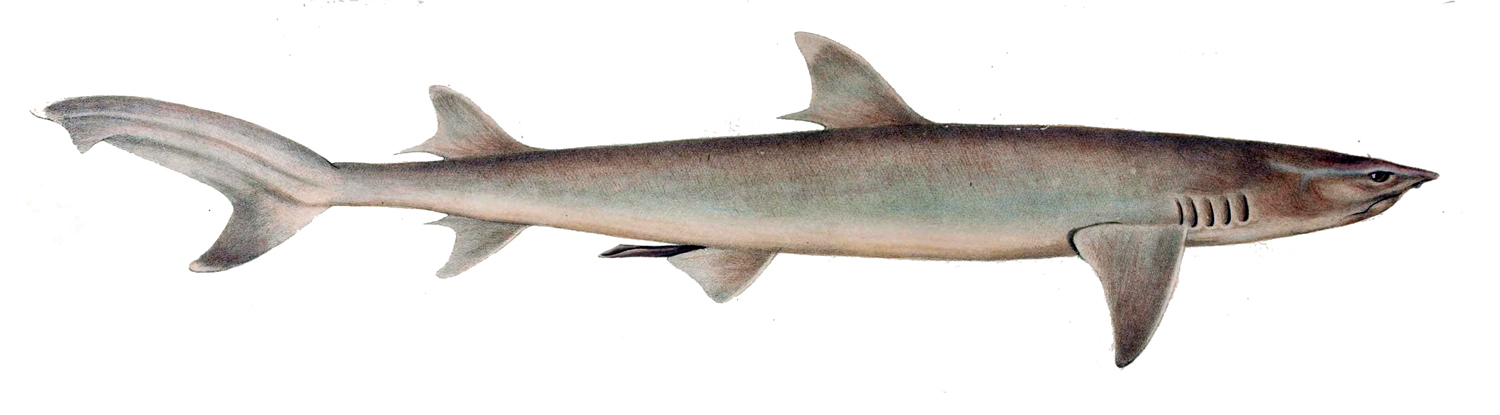
Early illustration of a whitetip reef shark from Systematische Beschreibung der Plagiostomen (1841).

The whitetip reef shark was first described by the German naturalist Eduard Rüppell as Carcharias obesus, in the 1837 Fische des Rothen Meere (Fishes of the Red Sea). His choice of the specific epithet obesus was curious, given that this shark is actually quite slender. Later in 1837, Johannes Müller and Friedrich Henle moved this species into its own genus Triaenodon, from the Greek triaena meaning "trident", and odon meaning "tooth". As Rüppell did not originally designate a holotype, in 1960 a 31-cm-long specimen caught off Jeddah, Saudi Arabia, was made the species lectotype. Other common names for this shark include blunthead shark, light-tip shark, reef whitetip shark, and whitetip shark.

Once placed in the family Triakidae, the whitetip reef shark is now recognized by most authors as belonging to the family Carcharhinidae on the basis of morphological characters, such as a full nictitating membrane, well-developed precaudal pit, strong lower caudal fin lobe, and scroll-like intestinal valves. Morphological and molecular phylogenetic analyses suggest the whitetip reef shark is grouped with the lemon sharks (Negaprion) and the sliteye shark (Loxodon) in occupying an intermediate position on the carcharhinid evolutionary tree, between most basal genera (Galeocerdo, Rhizoprionodon, and Scoliodon) and the most derived (Carcharhinus and Sphyrna).

== Distribution and habitat ==
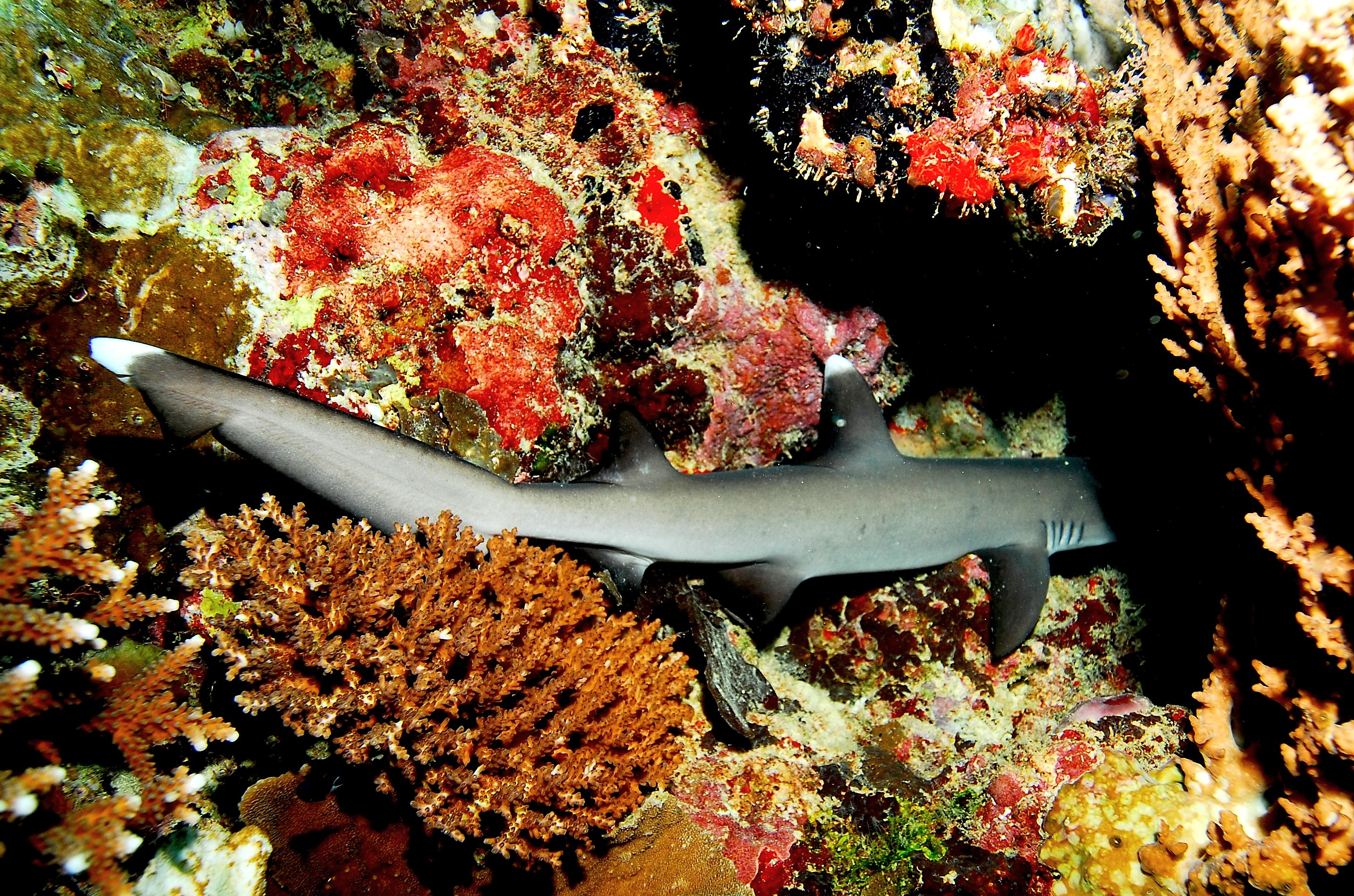
The whitetip reef shark almost exclusively inhabits coral reefs

The whitetip reef shark is distributed widely across the entire Indo-Pacific region. It was once thought to have existed in the Atlantic Ocean, based on fossil teeth found in North Carolina dated to the Miocene epoch, although subsequent research has suggested that the teeth are of a mackerel shark, and that the whitetip has never colonized the Atlantic. In the Indian Ocean, whitetip reef sharks can be found off of northern KwaZulu-Natal, South Africa and all along the East African coast, from the Horn of Africa to the Red Sea and along the Indian subcontinent (including Sri Lanka). They are found near many major island chains as well, including Madagascar, Mauritius, Mayotte, the Comoros, the Aldabra Group, the Seychelles and the Chagos Archipelago.

In the western and central Pacific Ocean, whitetips occur off South China, Taiwan, and the Ryukyu Islands, south to the Philippines and throughout the entire Coral Triangle, including the coastlines of Indonesia, East Timor and Papua New Guinea. Their range continues south to the northern Australia and the Great Barrier Reef. Whitetips are also found around numerous Pacific atolls and islands, including Melanesia, Micronesia, and Polynesia, north to Hawaii and south to the Pitcairn Islands. They have also been sighted near Midway and Johnston Atolls and Laysan. In the Eastern Pacific, they may be found off the west coasts of Costa Rica and Panama south to the Galápagos Islands, and as far north as Isla Isabel, Isla Socorro, and the southern tip of Baja California (Cabo San Lucas and Cabo Pulmo National Marine Park).

Associated almost exclusively with coral reef habitats, whitetip reef sharks are most often encountered around coral heads and ledges with high vertical relief, and additionally over sandy flats, in lagoons, and near drop-offs to deeper water. They prefer very clear water, and rarely stray far from the bottom during the day. The species is most common at a depth of 8–40 m (26–131 ft). On occasion, they may enter water less than 1 m deep when foraging; there is an exceptional record of a whitetip reef shark being captured from a depth of 330 m (1,080 ft) off the Ryukyu Islands.

== Description ==
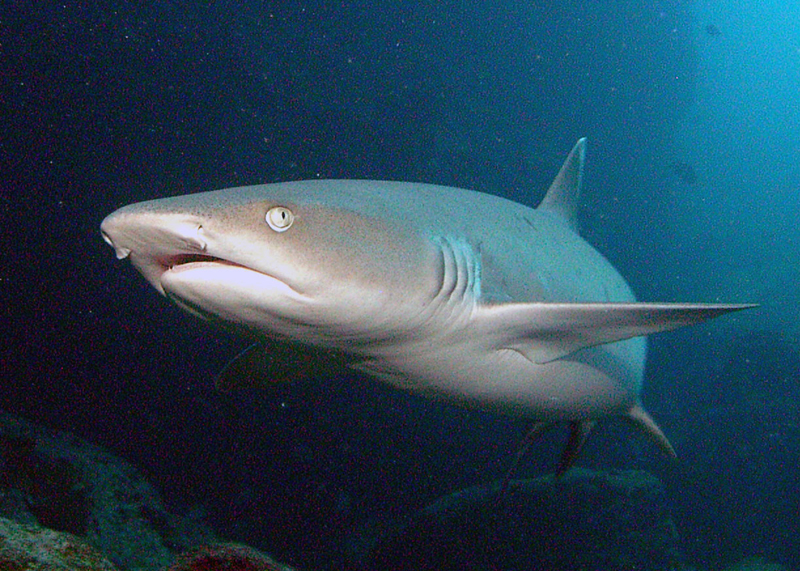
The "face" of a whitetip reef shark is distinctive, with a broad snout, tubular nasal flaps, and oval eyes with vertical pupils.

A relatively small species, few whitetip reef sharks are longer than 1.6 m (5.2 ft). The maximum length this species attains is often given as 2.1 m (6.9 ft), though this was originally based on visual observations and may be dubious. The maximum reported weight is 18.3 kg (40 lb). The whitetip reef shark has a slim body and a short, broad head. The snout is flattened and blunt, with large flaps of skin in front of the nares that are furled into tubes. The eyes are small and oval with vertical pupils and prominent ridges above, and are often followed by a small notch. The mouth has a distinct downward slant (imparting a disgruntled expression to the shark), with short furrows at the corners. There are 42–50 tooth rows in the upper jaw and 42–48 tooth rows in the lower jaw. Each tooth has a single narrow, smooth-edged cusp at the center, flanked by a pair of much smaller cusplets.

The first dorsal fin is positioned well back on the body, closer to the pelvic than the pectoral fins. The second dorsal and anal fins are large, about half to three-quarters as high as the first dorsal fin. The broad, triangular pectoral fins originate at or slightly before the level of the fifth gill slit. There is no ridge between the first and second dorsal fins. The lower lobe of the caudal fin is half the length of the upper, which has a strong notch near the tip. The dermal denticles are small and overlapping, usually with 7 horizontal ridges, giving the skin a smooth feel. The coloration is grayish to brownish above and white below, with a pattern of scattered small, dark spots unique to each individual. The tips of the first dorsal fin and upper caudal fin lobe, and sometimes also the second dorsal fin and lower caudal fin lobe, are bright white.

== Biology and ecology ==
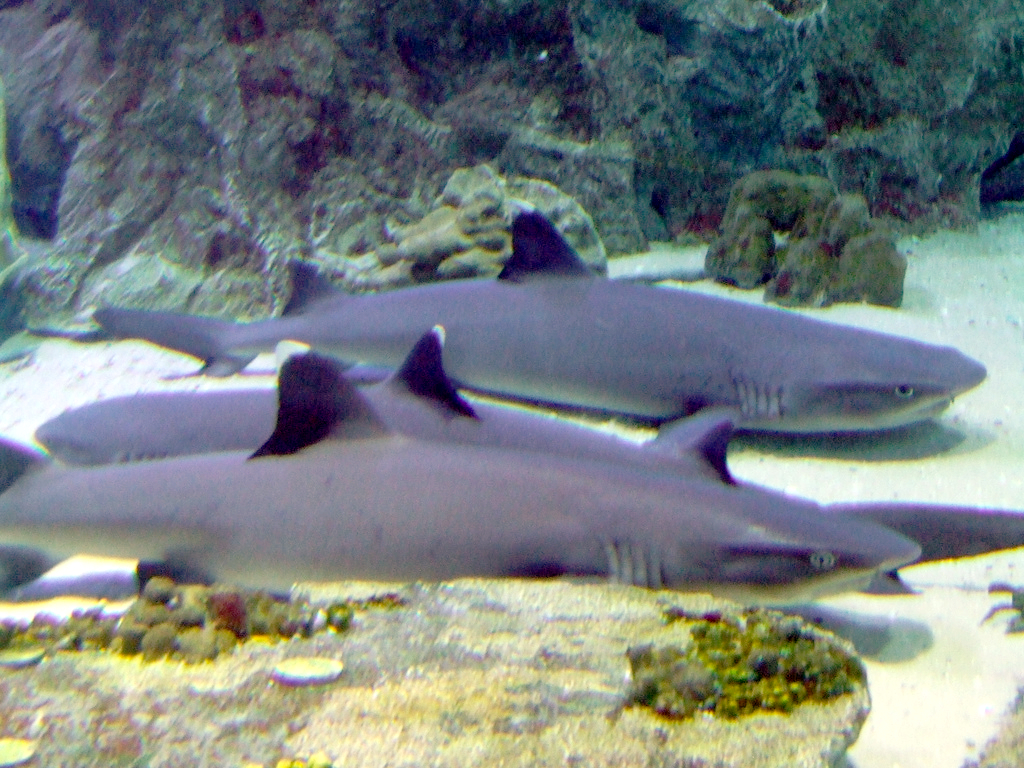
Whitetip reef sharks spend much of the day lying still on the bottom.

The whitetip reef shark is one of the three most common sharks inhabiting the reefs of the Indo-Pacific, the other two being the blacktip reef shark (Carcharhinus melanopterus) and the grey reef shark (Carcharhinus amblyrhynchos). The habitat preferences of this species overlap those of the other two, though it does not tend to frequent very shallow water like the blacktip reef shark, nor the outer reef like the grey reef shark. The whitetip reef shark swims with strong undulations of its body, and unlike other requiem sharks can lie motionless on the bottom and actively pump water over its gills for respiration. This species is most active at night or during slack tide, and spends much of the day resting inside caves singly or in small groups, arranged in parallel or stacked atop one another. Off Hawaii, these sharks may be found sheltering inside underwater lava tubes, while off Costa Rica they are often seen lying in the open on sandy flats.

Whitetip reef sharks generally remain within a highly localized area; only rarely do they undertake long movements, wandering for a while before settling down somewhere new. One study at Johnston Atoll found that none of the sharks examined had moved more than 3 km (1.9 mi) away from their original capture location over periods of up to a year. Another study at Rangiroa Atoll in French Polynesia found that, after more than three years, around 40% of the originally tagged sharks were still present on the same reef where they were first captured. An individual shark may rest inside the same cave for months to years. The daytime home range of a whitetip reef shark is limited to approximately 0.05 km^{2} (0.019 mi^{2}); at night this range increases to 1 km^{2} (0.39 mi^{2}). These sharks are not territorial and share their home ranges with others of their species; they do not perform threat displays.

Important predators of the whitetip reef shark include tiger sharks (Galeocerdo cuvier), Galapagos sharks (Carcharhinus galapagensis), and possibly also silvertip sharks (Carcharhinus albimarginatus), though they usually occur at depths greater than those favored by whitetip reef sharks. An 80 cm (31 in) long whitetip reef shark has also been found in the stomach of a giant grouper (Epinephelus lanceolatus), though these groupers are unlikely to be significant predators of this species due to their rarity. Known parasites of the whitetip reef shark include the copepod Paralebion elongatus and the praniza (parasitic) larvae of the isopod Gnathia grandilaris. While resting during the day, these sharks have been observed being cleaned by the wrasse Bodianus diplotaenia and the goby Elacatinus puncticulatus. Unusually, there is also a report of seven whitetip reef sharks adopting a cleaning posture (mouth agape and gills flared) in the midst of a swarm of non-cleaning hyperiid amphipods; the mechanical stimulation from the moving amphipods are thought to have evoked this behavior through their similarity to actual cleaner organisms.

=== Feeding ===
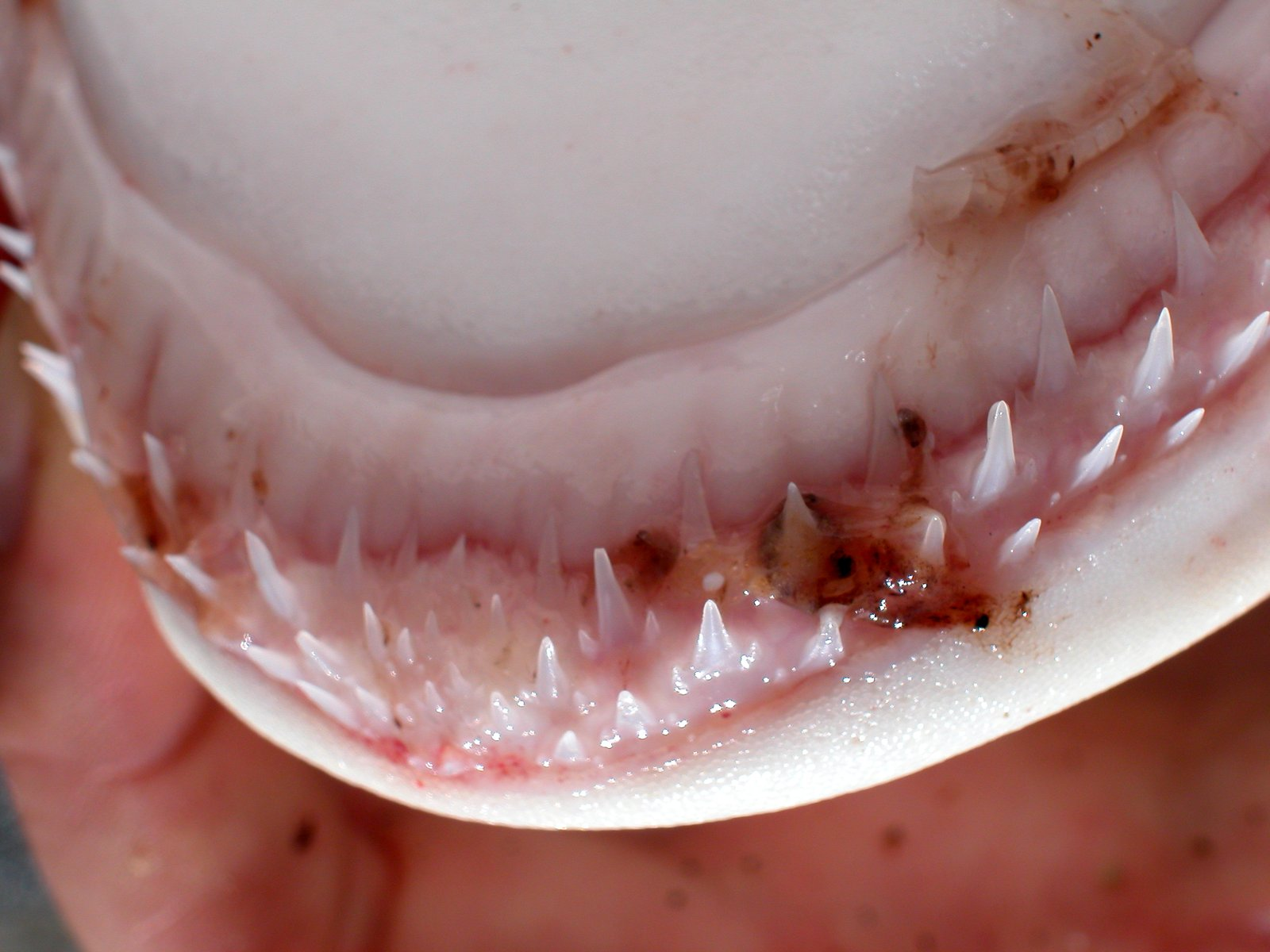
The lower jaw and teeth of whitetip reef shark

With its slender, lithe body, the whitetip reef shark specializes in wriggling into narrow crevices and holes in the reef and extracting prey inaccessible to other reef sharks. Alternatively, it is rather clumsy when attempting to take food suspended in open water. This species feeds mainly on bony fishes, including eels, squirrelfishes, snappers, damselfishes, parrotfishes, surgeonfishes, triggerfishes and goatfishes, as well as octopuses, spiny lobsters, and crabs. The whitetip reef shark is highly responsive to the olfactory, acoustic, and electrical cues given off by potential prey, while its visual system is attuned more to movement and/or contrast than to object details. It is especially sensitive to natural and artificial low-frequency sounds in the 25–100 Hz range, which evoke struggling fish.

Whitetip reef sharks hunt primarily at night, when many fishes are asleep and easily taken. After dusk, groups of sharks methodically scour the reef, often breaking off pieces of coral in their vigorous pursuit of prey. Multiple sharks may target the same prey item, covering every exit route from a particular coral head. Each shark hunts for itself and in competition with the others in its group. Unlike blacktip reef sharks and grey reef sharks, whitetip reef sharks do not become more excited when feeding in groups and are unlikely to be stirred into a feeding frenzy. Despite their nocturnal habits, whitetip reef sharks will hunt opportunistically in daytime. Off Borneo, this species gathers around reef drop-offs to feed on food brought up by the rising current. Off Hawaii, they follow Hawaiian monk seals (Monachus schauinslandi) and attempt to steal their catches. A whitetip reef shark can survive for six weeks without food.

=== Life history ===
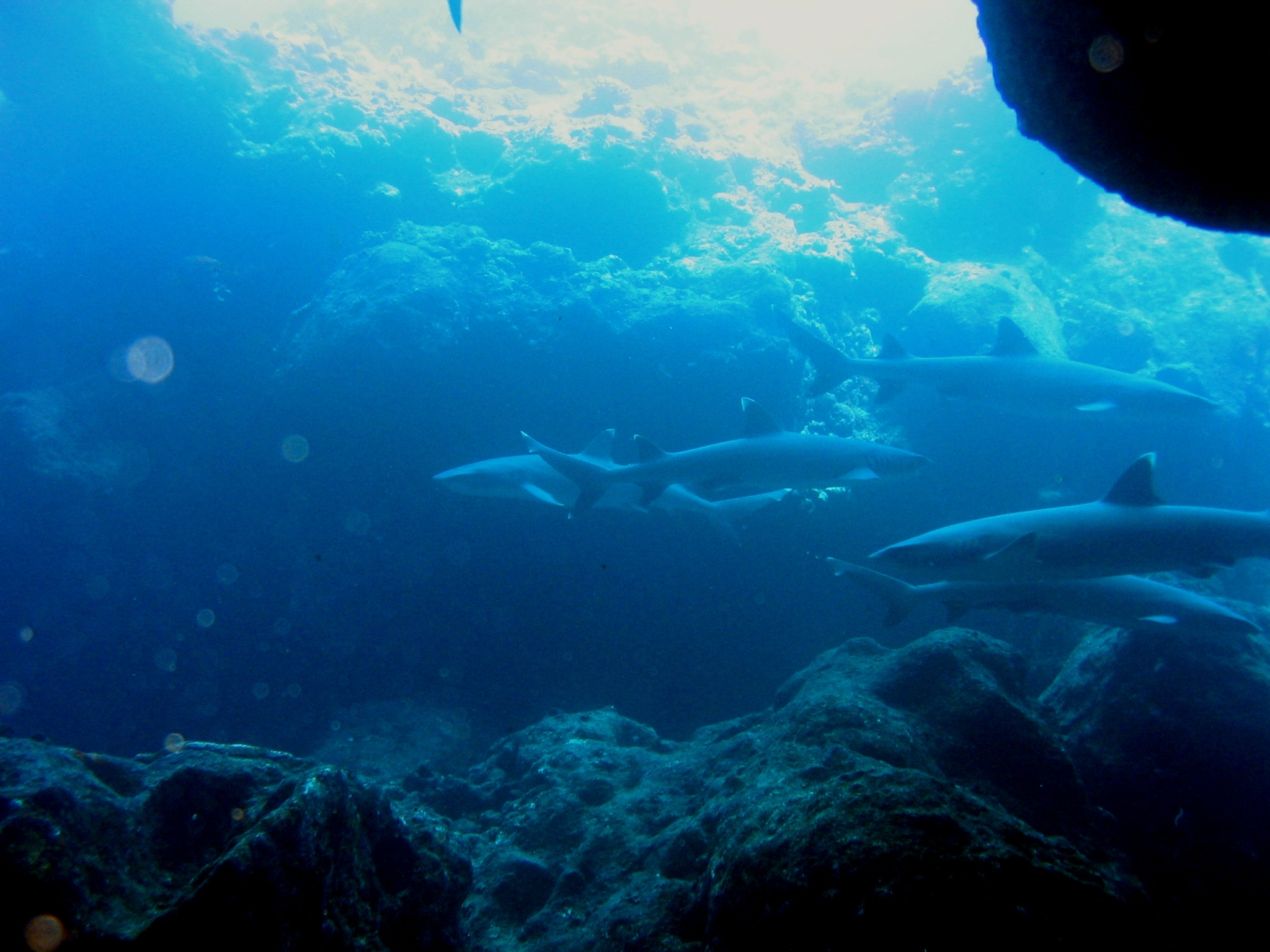
Gregarious in nature, whitetip reef sharks are often found in groups.

Like other members of its family, the whitetip reef shark is viviparous; once the developing embryos exhaust their supply of yolk, the yolk sac is converted into a placental connection through which the mother delivers nourishment for the remainder of gestation. Mature females have a single functional ovary, on the left side, and two functional uteruses. The reproductive cycle is biennial.

=== Mating ===
Mating is initiated when up to five males follow closely behind a female and bite at her fins and body, possibly cued by pheromones indicating the female's readiness. Each male attempts to seize the female by engulfing one of her pectoral fins; at times two males might grasp a female on both sides simultaneously. Once engaged, the sharks sink to the bottom, whereupon the male (or males) rotates one of his claspers forward, inflates the associated siphon sac (a subcutaneous abdominal organ that takes in seawater that is used to flush sperm into the female), and attempts to make contact with the female's vent. In many cases, the female resists by pressing her belly against the bottom and arching her tail; this may reflect mate choice on her part. The male has a limited time in which to achieve copulation, as while he is holding the female's pectoral fin in his mouth he is being deprived of oxygen. On the other hand, if the female is willing, the pair settles side-by-side with their heads pressed against the bottom and their bodies at an upward angle.

After a gestation period of 10–13 months, females give birth to litters of 1–6 (usually 2–3) pups. The number of offspring is not correlated with female size; each female produces an estimated average of 12 pups over her entire lifetime. Parturition occurs from May to August (autumn and winter) in French Polynesia, in July (summer) off Enewetak Atoll, and in October (summer) off Australia. Females give birth while swimming, making violent twists and turns of their bodies; each pup takes under an hour to fully emerge. The newborns measure 52–60 cm (20–24 in) long and have relatively longer caudal fins than adults. This shark develops slowly compared to other requiem sharks; newborns grow at a rate of 16 cm (6.3 in) per year while adults grow at a rate of 2–4 cm (0.79–1.57 in) per year. Sexual maturity is reached at a length of around 1.1 m (3.6 ft) and an age of 8–9 years, though mature males as small as 95 cm (37 in) long have been recorded from the Maldives, suggesting regional variation in maturation size. On the Great Barrier Reef, males live to 14 years and females to 19 years; the maximum lifespan of this shark may be upwards of 25 years. In 2008, a whitetip reef shark produced a single pup through possibly asexual means at the Nyiregyhaza Centre in Hungary; previous instances of asexual reproduction in sharks have been reported in the bonnethead (Sphyrna tiburo) and the blacktip shark (Carcharhinus limbatus).

== Human interactions ==
The white tip reef shark is more harmless and is seldom aggressive unless provoked. They are also fearless and curious, as the whitetip reef sharks may approach swimmers closely to investigate. However, these sharks readily attempt, and quite boldly, to steal catches from spear fishers, which has resulted in several people being bitten in the process. In some places, local whitetip reef sharks have learned to associate the sound of a speargun discharge or a boat dropping anchor with food and respond within seconds. As of 2008, the International Shark Attack File lists two provoked and three unprovoked attacks to this species. Whitetip reef sharks are well-suited to ecotourism diving, and with conditioning they can be hand-fed by divers. In Hawaiian mythology, the fidelity (i.e., "loyalty") of whitetip reef sharks to certain areas of the reef for years at a time may have inspired belief in ʻaumākua, the spirits of family ancestors that take animal form and protect their descendants.

The whitetip reef shark is taken by fisheries operating off Pakistan, India, Sri Lanka, Madagascar, and likely elsewhere, using longlines, gillnets, and trawls. The meat and liver are eaten, though sharks from certain areas present a substantial risk of ciguatera poisoning (especially the liver, which contains a much higher concentration of the toxin than the meat). The International Union for Conservation of Nature (IUCN) has assessed this species as Vulnerable, as its numbers have dropped in recent decades due to increasing, and thus far unregulated, fishing pressure in the tropics. Its restricted habitat, low dispersal, and slow reproduction are factors that limit this shark's capacity for recovering from overfishing. On the Great Barrier Reef, populations of whitetip reef sharks in fishing zones have been reduced by 80% relative to no-entry zones. Furthermore, populations in no-take zones, where boats are allowed but fishing prohibited, exhibit levels of depletion comparable to fishing zones due to poaching. Demographic models indicate that these depleted populations will continue to decline by 6.6–8.3% per year without additional conservation measures. In June 2018 the New Zealand Department of Conservation classified the whitetip reef shark as "Vagrant" under the New Zealand Threat Classification System.

== Other Triaenodon species ==
The T. willei is the only described extinct species of this genus, found in Europe, in Belgium, between the Eocene period (in Lutetian to Ypresian stages).

== See also ==
- List of sharks
