= Elacatinus colini =

Conservation status
- Least Concern (IUCN 3.1)

Scientific classification
- Domain: Eukaryota
- Kingdom: Animalia
- Phylum: Chordata
- Class: Actinopterygii
- Order: Gobiiformes
- Family: Gobiidae
- Genus: Elacatinus
- Species: E. colini

Binomial name
- Elacatinus colini J. E. Randall & Lobel, 2009

Species of fish

Elacatinus colini, the Belize sponge goby, is a species of goby native to the Western Central Atlantic Ocean, near Belize and Honduras.

== Etymology ==
Its specific name honours Patrick L. Colin, of the Coral Reef Research Foundation, Palau, who made a comparative study of the genus Elacatinus for his doctoral thesis.

== Appearance ==
Elacatinus colini was originally thought to be a color variant of E. xanthiprora from Florida but was recently classified as its own species due to the presence of a bright white, not yellow, stripe along its body. E. colini are typically around 3 cm in length (3.2 cm SL for males, 3.4 cm SL for females), and can be easily identified by the white strip running from its anterior to posterior end. On the E. colini's head, the lateral stripe is relatively small – about the same width as its pupil. However, on its body, the lateral stripe widens to about the same width as its eye. E. colini typically have 8 dorsal spines, 10-12 dorsal soft rays, 1 anal spine, 10–11 anal soft rays, and 17-19 pectoral rays. They lack scales and are covered with a thick adherent mucus. The bodies of E. colini are bluish-greenish gray above their lateral stripe, with the dorsal part of their head, iris, and lips exhibiting a bright yellow color and the ventral part of their body being white. Their fins are a translucent gray color.

== Habitat ==
Elacatinus colini live in marine systems in symbiotic relationships with various species of sponges, using them as shelter. They have been found to live in Carrie Bow Cay in Belize and Utila Island in Honduras. They live in shallow sponge, between 2–17 metres (6 ft 7 in – 55 ft 9 in) deep but it is possible that they live deeper as well. E. colini inhabit tropical areas, 17ºN - 16ºN, 88ºW - 89ºW. According to Tassell, E. colini can occupy an area of about 11,184 km^{2}.

== Population ==
Elacatinus colini were seemingly abundant in their local environment of Belize and Honduras, however, there is little data or research on their population trends.

== Diet ==
In a study performed by Majoris, Francisco, Atema and Buston, it was shown that E. colini larvae survived in higher numbers when fed wild-caught plankton as opposed to Rotifers (microscopic aquatic animals) and Artemia (a genus of aquatic crustaceans). The study also showed that the standard length of E. colini was higher when fed a diet of plankton as opposed to Artemia or rotifer. Researchers postulated this could be because larvae may not have developed the ability to digest Artemia and Rotifer, because Artemia could have changed water quality and thus affected the ability of the E. colini larvae to survive, or because the Artemia could have depleted the oxygen levels in the water and consequently lowered the survival rate of E. colini. However, this last hypothesis is the least likely because the research tanks were well oxygenated.

== Reproduction ==
In the study conducted by Majoris et al., it was shown that before spawning, the bodies of both male and female E. colini turn dark grey/black. Researchers also concluded that E. colini spawned within 3–44 days of being introduced to the study tanks, which was faster than Elacatinus lori. E. colini spawned in relatively small clutches in comparison to E. lori and spawned every 7.8 ± 1.7 days. The study also showed that male E. colini incubated the eggs by fanning/mouthing the clutch until it hatched, and females were sometimes observed to consume the larvae after hatching. E. colini spawn regularly for a period of 12 months, and embryos hatch with a fully functional mouth, inflated swim bladder, pigmented eyes, and two visible otoliths. After hatching, larvae tend to swim up to the surface of the water, as they are attracted to the light and feed on rotifers starting at around 12 hours after hatching.

== Development ==
Elacatinus colini are born with a fully functional mouth, inflated swim bladder, pigmented eyes, and two visible otoliths. After about 18–20 days post hatch (dph), fin folds are completely gone, and the pelvic and dorsal fins begin to form. At around 20–28 dph, the pelvic fin elongates but remains unfused. Pre-settled larvae have elongated snouts, partially fused pelvic fins, and exhibit the first dorsal fin. Once the pelvic fins have completely transformed into the pelvic disc, they begin to settle (earliest settlement begins at around 28 dph) and use their pelvic disc to suction onto surfaces. Settlement happens between 28–54 dph. The stripe along the body of E. colini develops immediately, while the yellow pigment on the snout takes a few days to develop.

== Conservation ==
There are no current observed threats to E. colini, however, the degradation of sponge habitats could negatively impact the species. Monitoring of the species can prevent any threats from drastically impacting the E. colini population. Further research concerning threats to this species and population trends need to be performed. However, despite the species' small distribution, E. colini is currently categorized as a Least Concern species.
