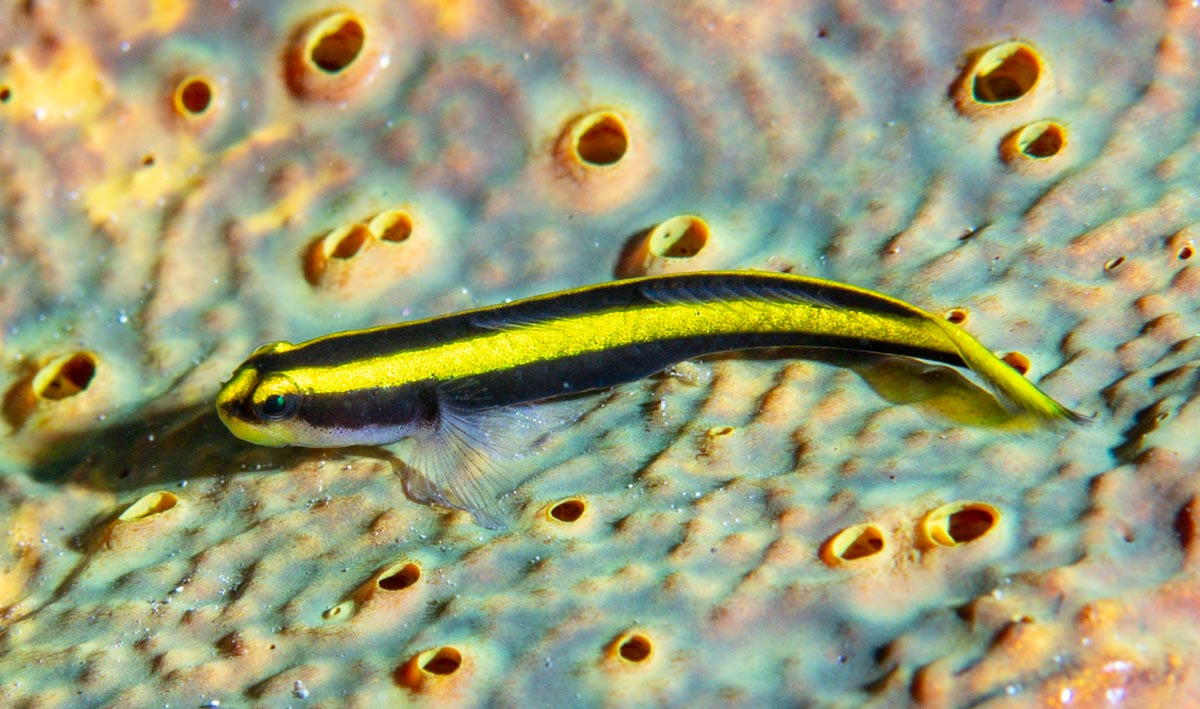

Scientific classification
- Kingdom: Animalia
- Phylum: Chordata
- Class: Actinopterygii
- Order: Gobiiformes
- Family: Gobiidae
- Genus: Elacatinus
- Species: E. pridisi

Binomial name
- Elacatinus pridisi Guimarães, Gasparini & Rocha, 2004

= Elacatinus pridisi =

Species of fish

Elacatinus pridisi is a species of goby endemic to the islands of Trindade and Martin Vaz and the seamounts associated to these islands in Brazil. Like other species of the genus Elacatinus, it engages in cleaning behavior. However, unlike other cleaners, it lives in association with both sponges and Montastrea cavernosa instead of only coral. It was also recorded in association with sea urchins.
