= Rhabderemiidae =

Scientific classification
- Kingdom: Animalia
- Phylum: Porifera
- Class: Demospongiae
- Order: Biemnida
- Family: Rhabderemiidae

Family of sponges

Rhabderemiidae is a family of sponges belonging to the order Biemnida.

Genera:

- Rhabderemia Topsent, 1890
