= Haplosyllis =

Scientific classification
- Kingdom: Animalia
- Phylum: Annelida
- Clade: Pleistoannelida
- Subclass: Errantia
- Order: Phyllodocida
- Family: Syllidae
- Genus: Haplosyllis; Langerhans, 1879

Genus of annelid worms

Haplosyllis is a genus of annelids belonging to the family Syllidae. The genus has cosmopolitan distribution.

== Description ==
Members of the genus Haplosyllis differ in size from less than 1 mm in length up to 6 cm, and are dorsally arched and ventrally flat, like most Syllids. Most species are white to yellow in colour and are without coloured markings. The genus is characterized by the presence of simple, hooked shape chaetae.

== Species ==
Haplosyllis contains the following species:

- Haplosyllis aciculata Lattig, Martin & Aguado, 2010
- Haplosyllis agelas Uebelacker, 1982
- Haplosyllis amphimedonicola Paresque & Nogueira, 2014
- Haplosyllis anitae Moreno-Martín, Mourín, Verdes & Álvarez-Campos, 2023
- Haplosyllis anthogorgicola Utinomi, 1956
- Haplosyllis aplysinicola Lattig & Martin, 2011
- Haplosyllis aurantiaca Eisig, 1881
- Haplosyllis basticola Sardá, Avila & Paul, 2002
- Haplosyllis brevicirra Rioja, 1941
- Haplosyllis carmenbritoae Lattig, San Martín & Martin, 2007
- Haplosyllis cephalata Verrill, 1900
- Haplosyllis chaetafusorata Lattig & Martin, 2011
- Haplosyllis crassicirrata Aguado, San Martín & Nishi, 2006
- Haplosyllis cratericola (Buzhinskaja, 1990)
- Haplosyllis djiboutiensis (Gravier, 1900)
- Haplosyllis eldagainoae Lattig & Martin, 2011
- Haplosyllis giuseppemagninoi Lattig & Martin, 2011
- Haplosyllis granulosa (Lattig, San Martín & Martin, 2007)
- Haplosyllis guillei Moreno-Martín, Mourín, Verdes & Álvarez-Campos, 2023
- Haplosyllis gula Treadwell, 1924
- Haplosyllis imajimai Lattig, Martin & San Martín, 2010
- Haplosyllis ingensicola Lattig, Martin & Aguado, 2010
- Haplosyllis lattigae Paresque, Fukuda & Nogueira, 2016
- Haplosyllis larsi Moreno-Martín, Mourín, Verdes & Álvarez-Campos, 2023
- Haplosyllis leylae Cepeda, Martin, Britayev, Al-Aidaroos & Lattig, 2017
- Haplosyllis loboi Paola, San Martín & Martin, 2006
- Haplosyllis navasi Lattig & Martin, 2011
- Haplosyllis nicoleae Lattig, Martin & Aguado, 2010
- Haplosyllis niphatesicola Lattig & Martin, 2011
- Haplosyllis ohma (Imajima & Hartman, 1964)
- Haplosyllis orientalis (Buzhinskaja, 1990)
- Haplosyllis rosenalessoae Paresque & Nogueira, 2014
- Haplosyllis sanchoi Lattig, Martin & San Martín, 2010
- Haplosyllis sandii Lattig, Martin & San Martín, 2010
- Haplosyllis spongicola (Grube, 1855)
- Haplosyllis spongiphila (Verrill, 1885)
- Haplosyllis streptocephala (Grube, 1857)
- Haplosyllis tenhovei Lattig, Martin & Aguado, 2010
- Haplosyllis trifalcata (Day, 1960)
- Haplosyllis uncinigera (Grube, 1878)
- Haplosyllis vassiae Moreno-Martín, Mourín, Verdes & Álvarez-Campos, 2023

== Ecology ==
Most members of Haplosyllis live in association with sponges.
