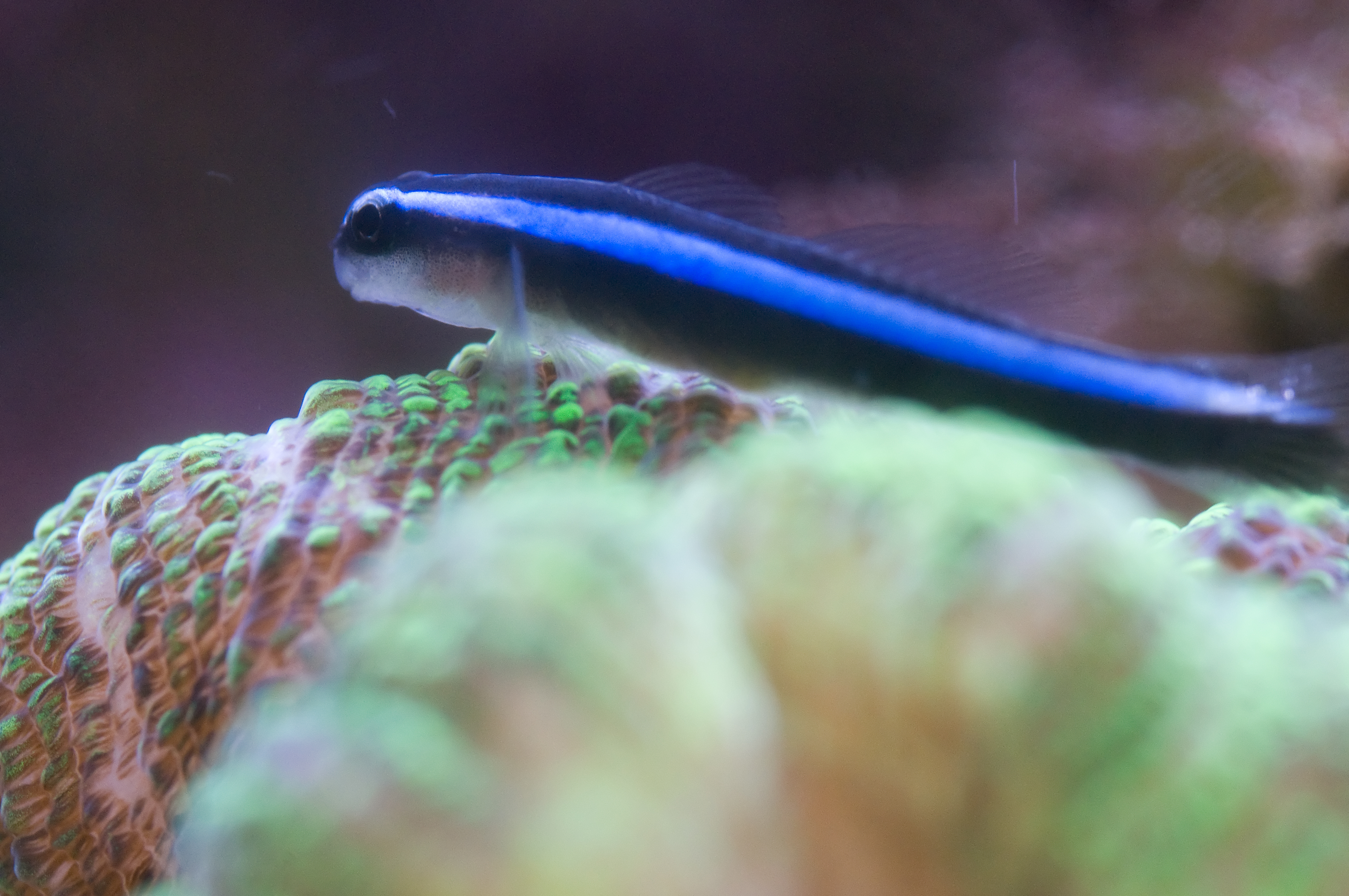

Conservation status
- Least Concern (IUCN 3.1)

Scientific classification
- Domain: Eukaryota
- Kingdom: Animalia
- Phylum: Chordata
- Class: Actinopterygii
- Order: Gobiiformes
- Family: Gobiidae
- Genus: Elacatinus
- Species: E. oceanops

Binomial name
- Elacatinus oceanops D. S. Jordan, 1904

Synonyms
- Gobiosoma oceanops (D. S. Jordan, 1904)

= Elacatinus oceanops =

Species of fish

Elacatinus oceanops, commonly known as the neon goby, is a species of goby native to waters of the Atlantic and Gulf coast of North America from Florida to Belize. This cleaner fish can be found on coral heads at depths from 1 to 45 m (3.3 to 147.6 ft). This species grows to a total length of 5 cm (2.0 in). This species can also be found in the aquarium trade.
