= Haplosyllis agelas =

Scientific classification
- Kingdom: Animalia
- Phylum: Annelida
- Clade: Pleistoannelida
- Subclass: Errantia
- Order: Phyllodocida
- Family: Syllidae
- Genus: Haplosyllis
- Species: H. agelas

Binomial name
- Haplosyllis agelas Uebelacker, 1982

Species of polychaete

Haplosyllis agelas is a species of polychaete worm in the family Syllidae, found in the Bahamas. Its host is the demosponge Agelas dispar, of which the species epithet is named after.

== Description ==
H. agelas is orange-yellow in colour and grows to about 1 to 2 cm in length, with a width of 0.6 to 1 mm. It has four small, lentigerous, red eyes and large palps.
