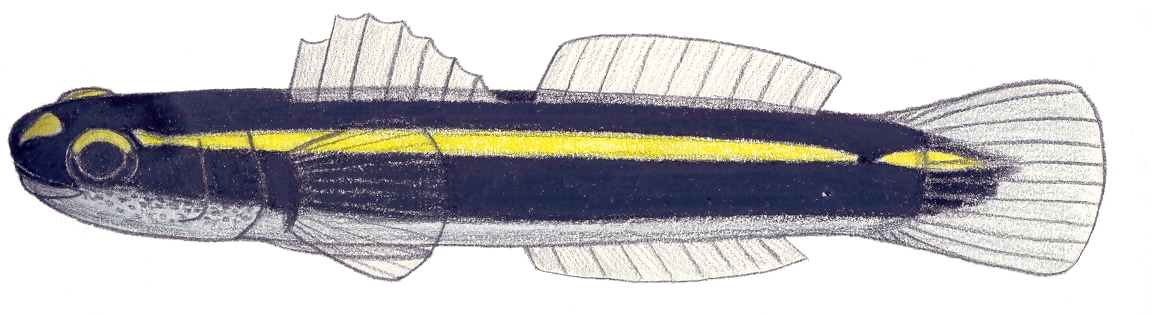

Conservation status
- Endangered (IUCN 3.1)

Scientific classification
- Kingdom: Animalia
- Phylum: Chordata
- Class: Actinopterygii
- Order: Gobiiformes
- Family: Gobiidae
- Genus: Elacatinus
- Species: E. atronasus

Binomial name
- Elacatinus atronasus (Böhlke & Robins, 1968)

Synonyms
- Gobiosoma atronasum Böhlke & Robins, 1968; Elacatinus atronasum (Böhlke & Robins, 1968)

= Elacatinus atronasus =

Species of fish

Elacatinus atronasus is a species of ray-finned fish in the family Gobiidae which is endemic to a single reef in Exuma Sound in the Bahamas. It is a species associated with a coral reefs but unlike many other species in the genus Elacatinus it does not engage in cleaning behaviour, feeding instead on particulate zooplankton. It occurs in large, mixed groups in the vicinity of vertical faces which have plentiful holes and near undercut ledges. It forms schools above the sea floor where has been recorded as remaining stationary, hovering above corals by day, resting on the coral during the night. Its reproductive behaviour is unknown. The IUCN assess Elacatinus atronasus as endangered due to its restricted range and the perceived vulnerability of this species to predation by the invasive lionfish, Pterois miles and Pterois volitans.
