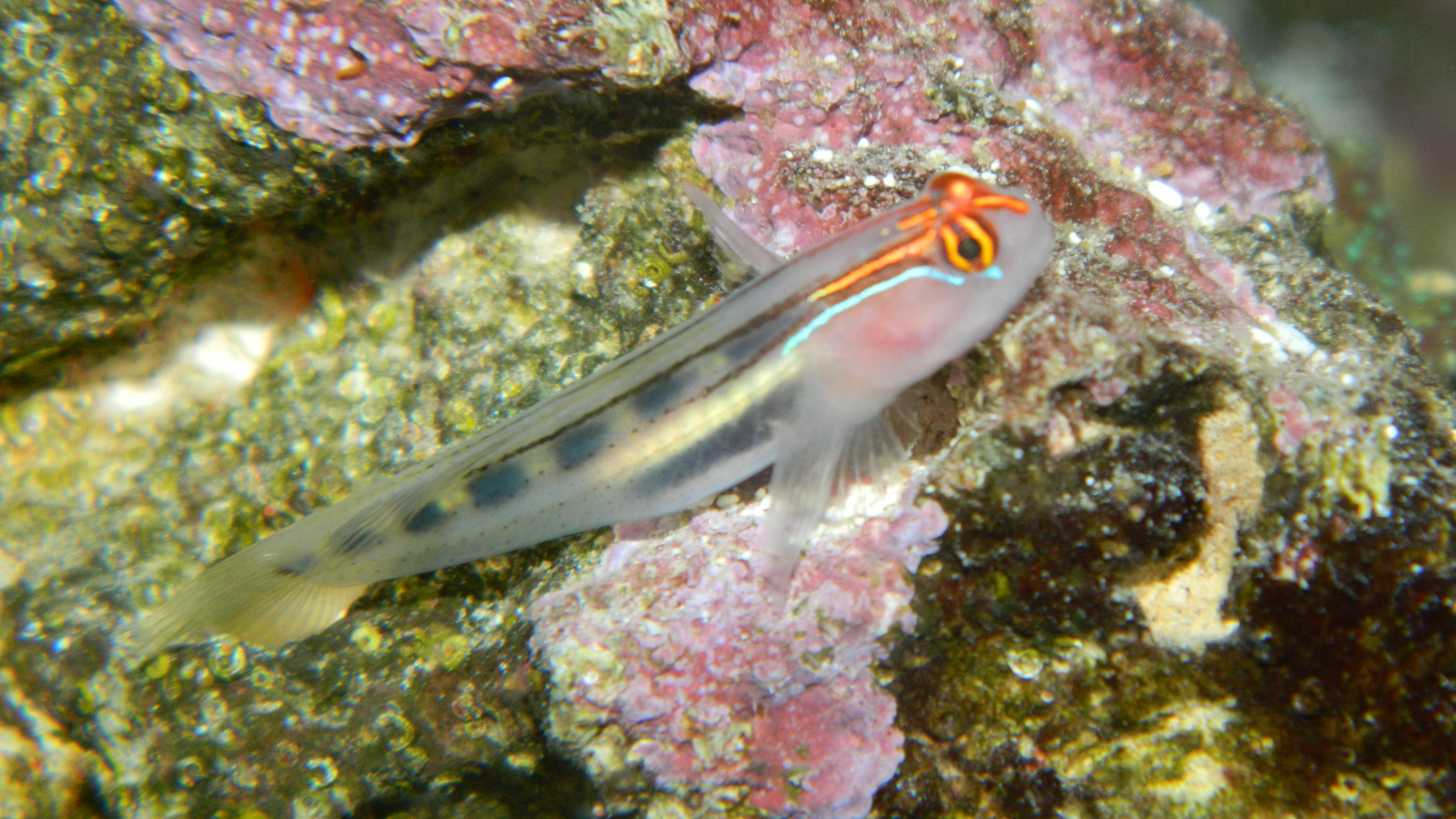

Conservation status
- Least Concern (IUCN 3.1)

Scientific classification
- Kingdom: Animalia
- Phylum: Chordata
- Class: Actinopterygii
- Order: Gobiiformes
- Family: Gobiidae
- Genus: Elacatinus
- Species: E. puncticulatus

Binomial name
- Elacatinus puncticulatus (Ginsburg, 1938)

Synonyms
- Gobiosoma puncticulatum Ginsburg, 1938; Gobiosoma rubrifrons Fowler, 1944

= Elacatinus puncticulatus =

Species of fish

Elacatinus puncticulatus is a species of goby from the eastern central Pacific Ocean, where it is found on reefs from the Gulf of California to Ecuador. This species occurs at depths ranging from 1 to 21m, and usually in association with the sea urchin Eucidaris thouarsii. The size of the goby varies depending on sex, with females being typically smaller than males, and their geographical location as well as their role as a cleaner goby also has impacts on their morphology. Due to their bright coloration and lack of aggression, the species is commonly found in the aquarium trade.

== Description ==
Elacatinus puncticulatus is a member of the family Gobiidae, which is broken up into two genera: Elacatinus and Gobiosoma. Elacatinus is a genus of goby fish comprising 25 species with characteristic 7 spines, 28 vertebrae, compressed skull shape, and transparent fins. E. puncticulatus are the only species in the genus that display a lack of scales on the head and body. The E. puncticulatus species in particular is characterized by the strong red and blue coloration on its head, with yellow and black striped coloration on its body, and a dark horizontal stripe behind its eye. The blue stripe near the head of many Elacatinus species is often seen as an adaptation that allows the fish to effectively attract clients that they clean as a part of their role as a symbiotic cleaner species. The species is sometimes broken up into two clades, with subclades within those, based on interspecific variations seen in both their coloration and genetics. Those variations are believed to have been a result of oceanographic processes and habitat discontinuities that separated different E. puncticulatus groups over time. Depending on their location, different members of the species display different colors on their head, body, and eye stripes, which can range from red to more of a yellow-orange.

Their general size differs depending on sex, with males reaching around 30-40mm in length while females only reach around 22-27mm and this size difference between the sexes increases as general latitude increases. Besides just geographic location, their role as a cleaner goby also has an impact on their morphology. Elacatinus as a genus typically displays a terminal mouth position that corresponds to their roles as cleaner fish, but E. puncticulatus specifically display a heterodont dentition as well, meaning they have more than one type of tooth morphology. This differentiates them from other cleaner species in their genus, but is characteristic of their role as an occasional, or facultative, cleaner (as compared to dedicated, or obligate, cleaners).

== Distribution ==
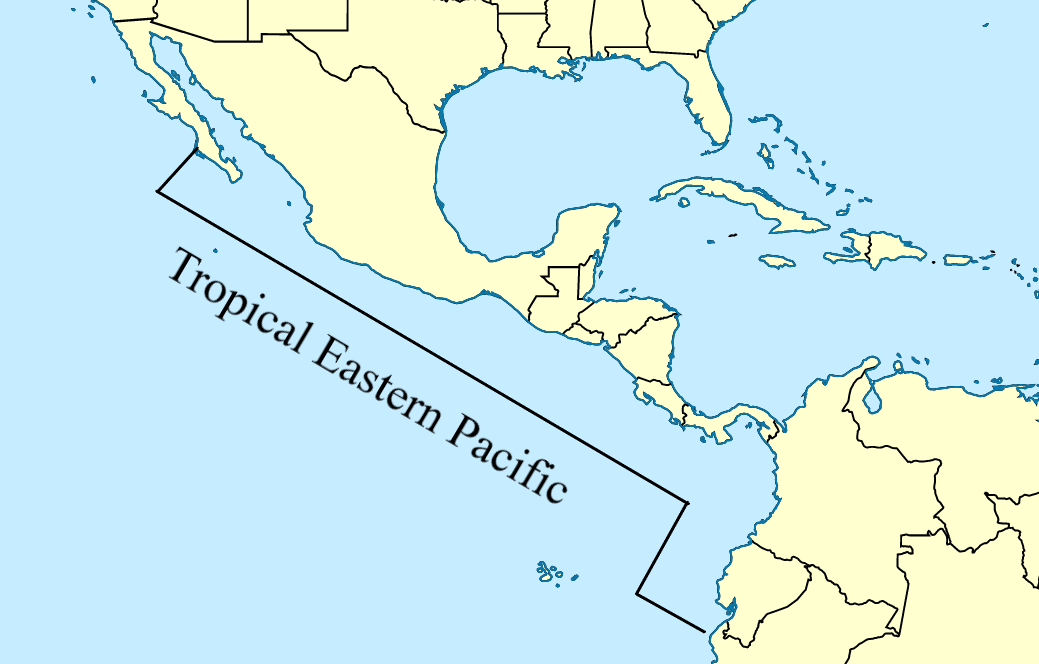
The Tropical Eastern Pacific spans from the Southern region of the Baja Peninsula in California to Northern Peru

E. puncticulatus are a shallow-living goby found along the continental shore of the Tropical Eastern Pacific (TEP), which ranges from the Southern tip of the California peninsula to the South of Ecuador. Specifically within this area, the species live primarily between the subtidal zone and depths of 21m on rocky or coral reefs. Their habitat on coral reefs, considered "cleaning stations", which combined with the bright blue coloration on parts of their head allows the species to attract clients and feed off of the removed ectoparasites. They are the only species of the genus Elacatinus not found in the Atlantic, and only one of two species in the genus found in the TEP. Their distribution is shaped by habitat discontinuities that restrict their dispersal in the area, one of the most notable examples being two muddy sections of shore within the TEP.

== Growth and Reproduction ==
Elacatinus puncticulatus display active courtship before spawning and parental behaviors after spawning. Males of E. puncticulatus show a gray head and yellow and black body coloration instead of their usual red and blue head coloration. One day prior to spawning, males move their pectoral fins to promote burrow cleanliness and display heavy breathing to signify readiness. Females of E. puncticulatus display strong red and black colors, but become pale three days before spawning. The male knows the female is ready to spawn because her urogenital region turns from brown to red the day prior to spawning. The genus Elacatinus are primarily gonochoristic, do not change sex, and often maintain stable monogamous relationships throughout their life.

E. puncticulatus produce benthic eggs that give rise to pelagic larvae. Male E. puncticulatus clean the dead eggs after hatching, but sometimes they will clean the eggs before hatching, which leads to a loss of up to 50% of the eggs. E. puncticulatus produce around 150 eggs per spawn, but only about 100 will actually hatch and produce pelagic larvae. The eggs range in size from 0.4 to 0.7mm. A heartbeat can be detected at 120 hours post fertilization (5 days) when they grow most rapidly and have the highest mortality. Spontaneous hatching takes about an hour and a half to complete and occurs 168 hours after fertilization (7 days). The incubation and embryonic development stages of E. puncticulatus are similar to those of Elacatinus figaro. There is a lot unknown about E. puncticulatus larval stage including distribution and time spent in the pelagic larval stage, but similar Elacatinus species have a range of 21–38 days.

== Ecology ==
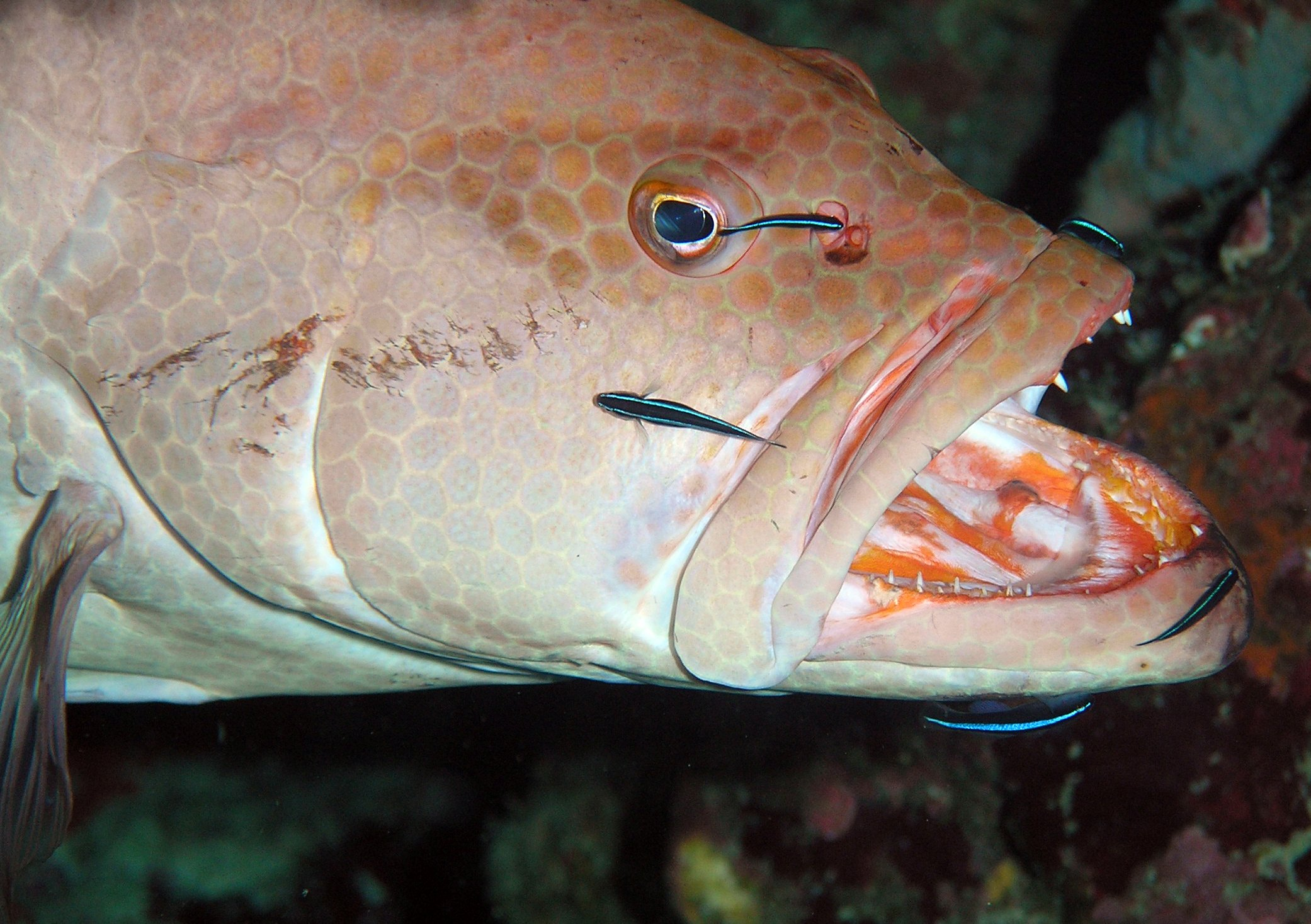
Elacatinus cleaner gobies feeding off ectoparasites of a much larger "client" fish

Elacatinus puncticulatus are found in corals in the continental shelf of the TEP. They often live in association with sea urchins, although the reason for this is undetermined. The Elacatinus genus feeds primarily on ectoparasites from cleaning and cellular fish debris, and E. puncticulatus seem to be no different. Both males and females clean. Cleaning gobies can display cheating behavior when cleaning with a partner, where they consume scales and mucus from the clients instead of just ectoparasites, although this is uncommon in the Elacatinus genus. When cleaning with the opposite sex, males tend to modify behavior to be more cooperative and females tend to stay the same. Clients of this cleaning mutualism are either non-predatory fish like parrotfishes, or piscivorous fish that are potential predators for the goby, like longfin damselfish, yellowtail damselfish, and graysby grouper. While some clients are predatory to E. puncticulatus and other cleaner gobies, the predatory clients are often immediately cleaned upon arrival, which could help their identification as a cleaner and reduce the risk of predation. The immediate cleaning of those predator clients may reduce the risk of predation, but it does not provide any foraging advantage since predator clients and non-predator clients offer the same amount of ectoparasites, and predatory clients often decrease the visits made by the more abundant non-predatory clients.

== Aquarium Trade ==
The 25 species of Elacatinus are considered "neon gobies" due to their brightly colored appearance and the variety of coloration they display. Along with their attractive appearance, their ability to become domesticated rather easily as well as their relatively calm disposition make them more appealing to those involved in the aquarium trade of marine fish and coral. As a result of this, many of the species, including the bright red and blue E. puncticulatus are kept for ornamental purposes in many different regions.

Elacatinus puncticulatus is commonly found in the aquarium trade industry, because new technologies have made it easier to manage captive marine species. The United States Fish and Wildlife Service CITES program requires certain species to be named specifically when trading, but E. puncticulatus is not on the list. E. puncticulatus is referred to as marine tropical fish in reports. It can be difficult for the National Oceanic and Atmospheric Administration to regulate their trade and study their endangerment status.
