= Haplosyllis spongicola =

Scientific classification
- Kingdom: Animalia
- Phylum: Annelida
- Clade: Pleistoannelida
- Subclass: Errantia
- Order: Phyllodocida
- Family: Syllidae
- Genus: Haplosyllis
- Species: H. spongicola

Binomial name
- Haplosyllis spongicola (Grube, 1855)

Synonyms
- H. (Syllis) hamata (Claparède, 1868); H. cephalata Verrill, 1900; H. gula Treadwell, 1924; H. hamata (Claparède, 1868); H. maderensis Czerniavsky, 1881; H. oligochaeta; H. palpata Verrill, 1900; H. spongicola tentaculata Marion, 1877; H. spongicola var. spongicola (Grube, 1855); H. dispar Verrill, 1900; Nereis teticola Delle Chiaje, 1828; Syllis (Haplosyllis) djiboutiensis Gravier, 1900; S. (Haplosyllis) hamata Claparède, 1868; S. (Haplosyllis) spongicola Grube, 1855; S. hamata Claparède, 1868; S. oligochaeta Bobretzky, 1870; S. setubalensis McIntosh, 1885; S. spongicola Grube, 1855; S. spongicola tentaculata Marion, 1879; S. streptocephala Grube, 1857

Species of annelid worm

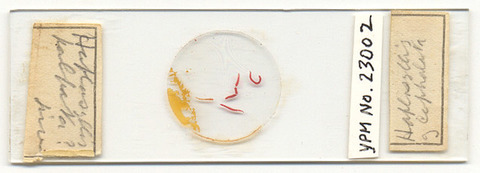
Haplosyllis spongicola preserved specimen

Haplosyllis spongicola, the sponge worm, is a species of polychaete worm in the family Syllidae. It was previously classified as Syllis spongicola and is part of a species complex of closely related species that are difficult to distinguish morphologically and where the demarcation between them is unclear. It is found in shallow temperate, subtropical and tropical seas worldwide, wherever its host sponges are found.

== Description ==
Haplosyllis spongicola is a small white segmented worm which lives parasitically on about forty known species of sponge around the world. It grows to a length of several centimetres. The body is cylindrical and the prostomium bears three antennae and four eyes. The pharynx has a single tooth surrounded by conical fleshy protuberances. Each segment bears paired appendages known as parapodia with tufts of cilia known as cirri on the dorsal and ventral sides. There are also a small number of simple chaetae or bristles on each segment.

== Distribution ==
Haplosyllis spongicola has a cosmopolitan distribution and is found in shallow coastal habitats in both temperate and tropical locations throughout the world. The holotype came from Atlantic waters off the coast of Spain.

== Ecology ==
Haplosyllis spongicola lives on the inside walls of a number of species of sponges. It inserts its proboscis into the individual cells and sucks out the contents. There may be tens of thousands of individual worms in one sponge and they are sometimes so abundant that they make up five percent of the weight of the sponge. On dark-coloured sponges such as Neofibularia nolitangere, the worms are easy to observe as they protrude from the inside walls of the sponge. In the Caribbean region, several species of small goby (Elacatinus spp.) live inside the sponges, feeding almost exclusively on the worms.

== Biology ==
Haplosyllis spongicola reproduces by means of headless stolons that grow out of the parapodia, each having a pair of black ocular spots and up to thirty segments. They eventually detach and become new individuals.
