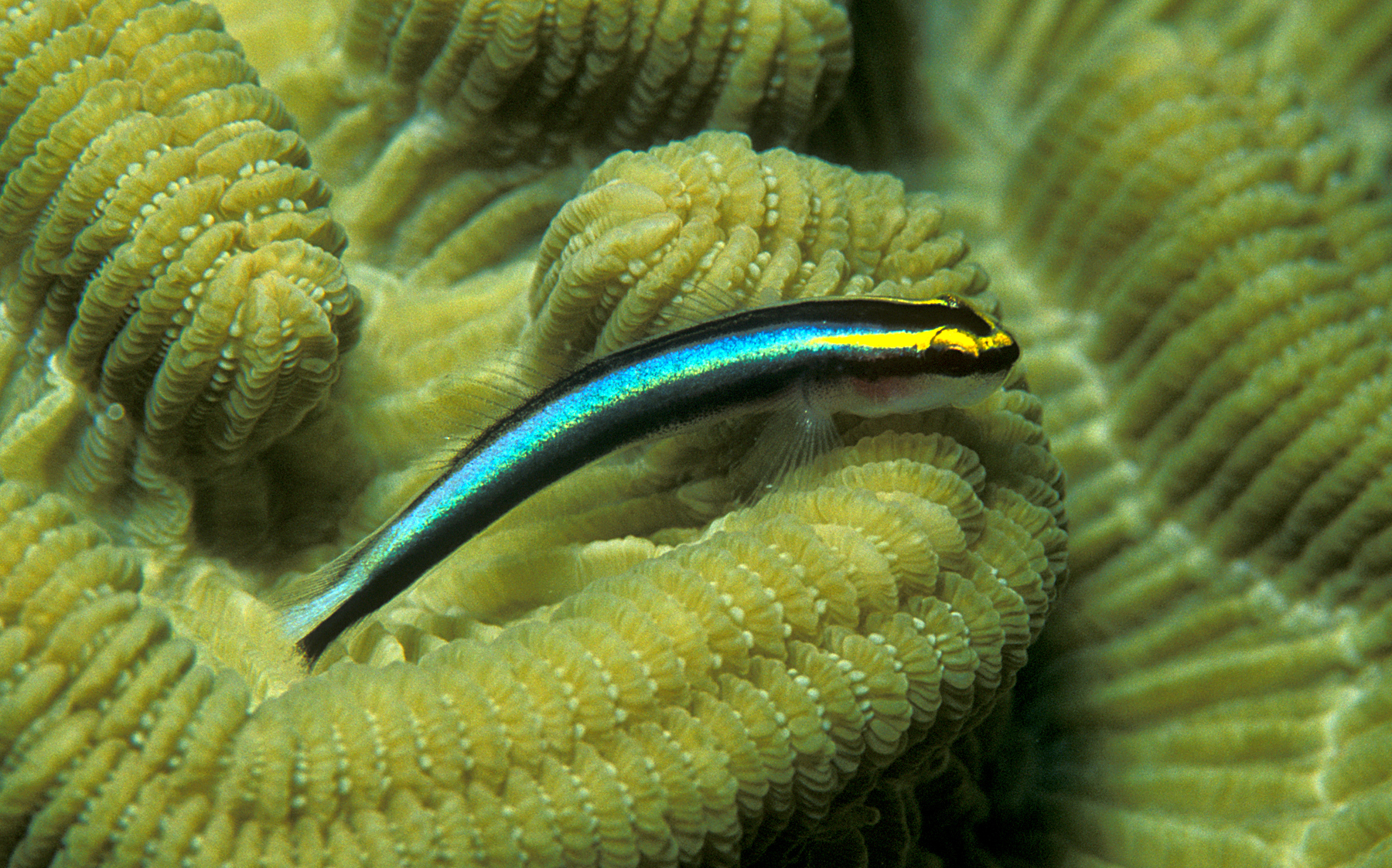
- Sharknose goby (E. evelynae)

Scientific classification
- Kingdom: Animalia
- Phylum: Chordata
- Class: Actinopterygii
- Order: Gobiiformes
- Family: Gobiidae
- Genus: Elacatinus; D. S. Jordan, 1904

Type species
- Elacatinus oceanops D. S. Jordan, 1904

Synonyms
- Gobicula Ginsburg, 1944

= Elacatinus =

Genus of fishes

Elacatinus is a genus of small marine gobies, often known collectively as the neon gobies. Although only one species, E. oceanops, is technically the "neon goby", because of their similar appearance, other members of the genus are generally labeled neon gobies, as well. Except for a single East Pacific species, all reside in warmer parts of the West Atlantic, including the Caribbean and Gulf of Mexico. They are known for engaging in symbiosis with other marine creatures by providing them cleaning service that consists of getting rid of ectoparasites on their bodies. In return, Elacatinus species obtain their primary source of food, ectoparasites.

== Species ==
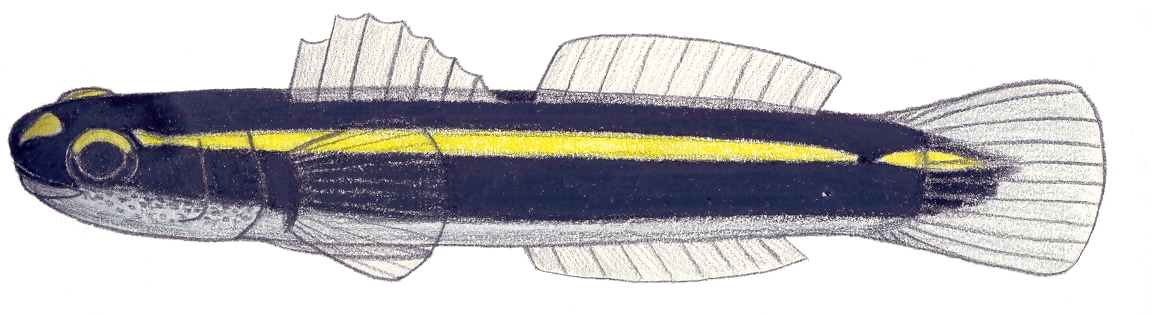
E. atronasum

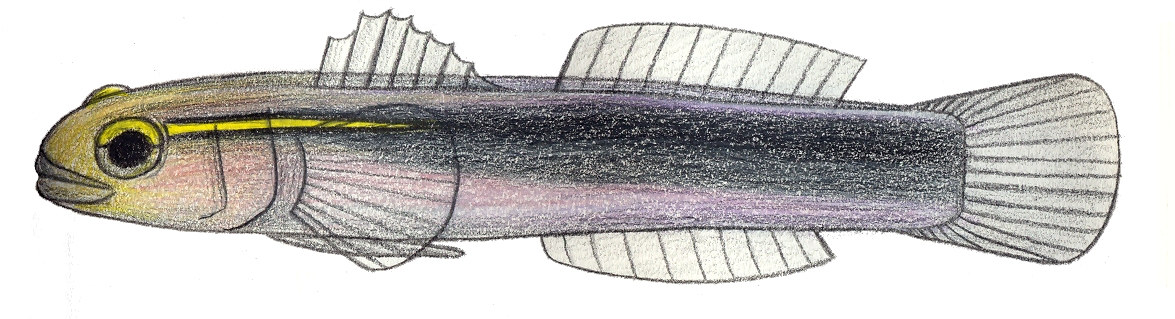
E. chancei

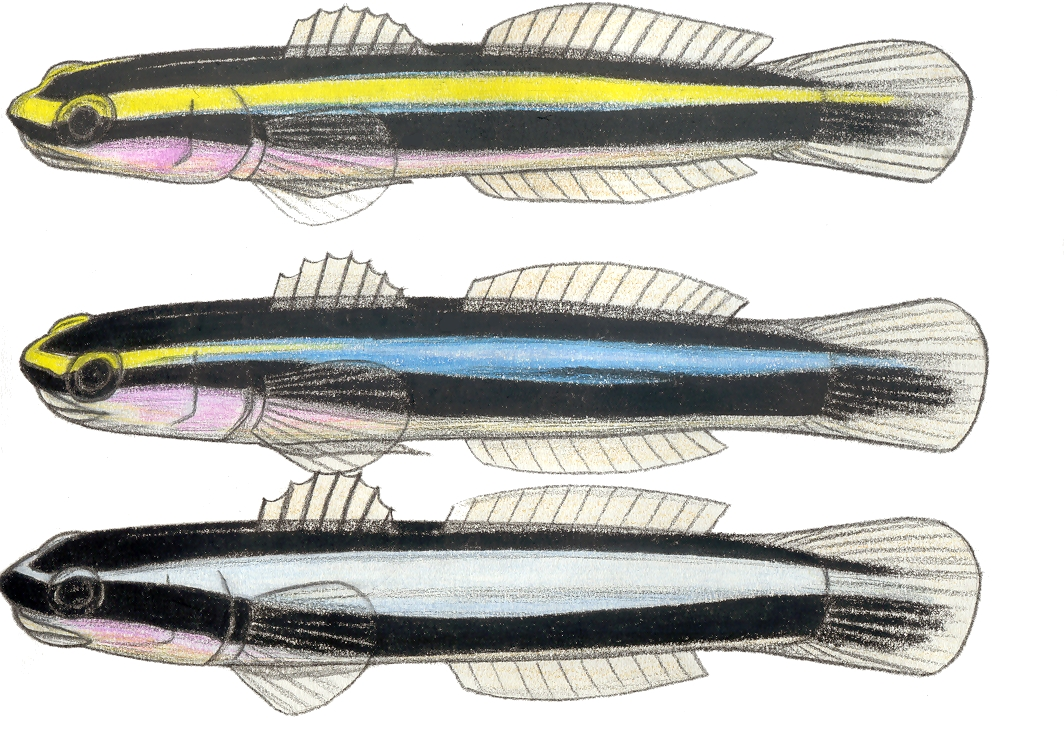
E. evelinae

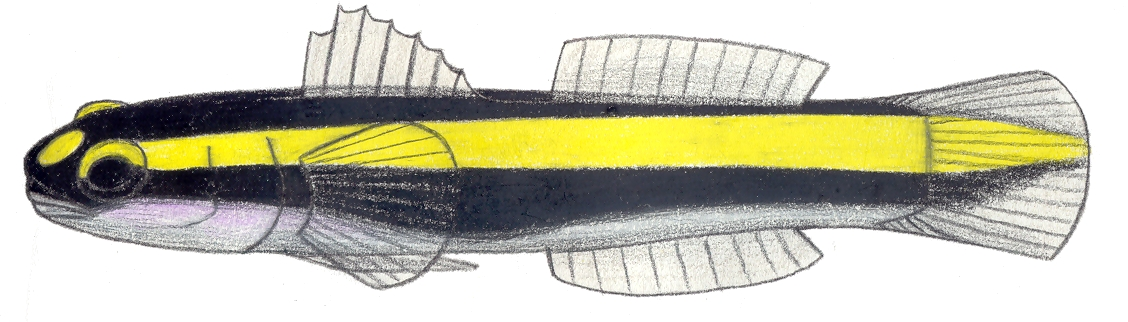
E. figaro

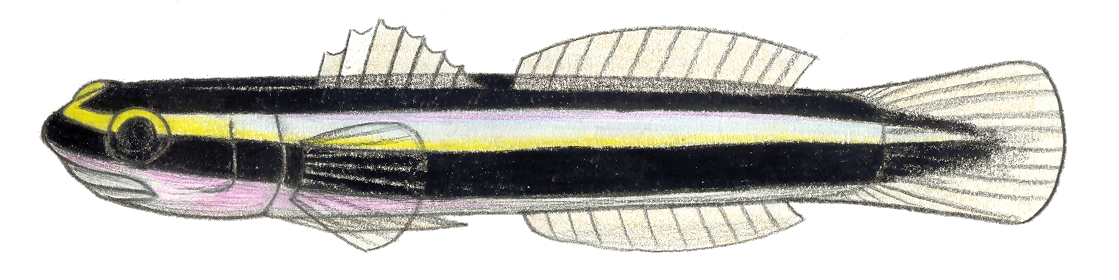
E. genie

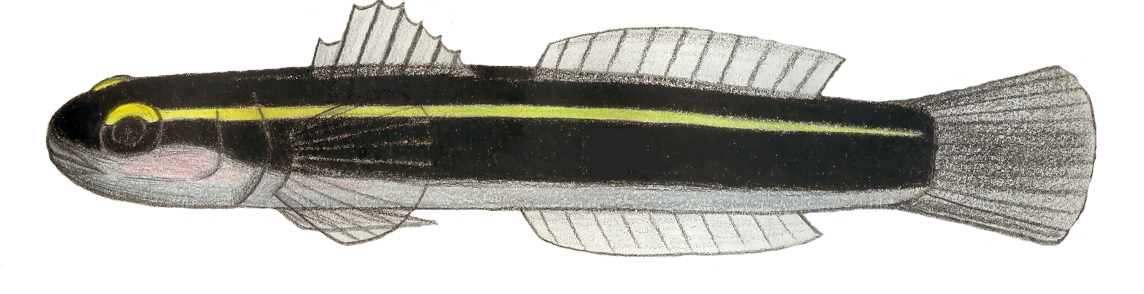
E. horsti

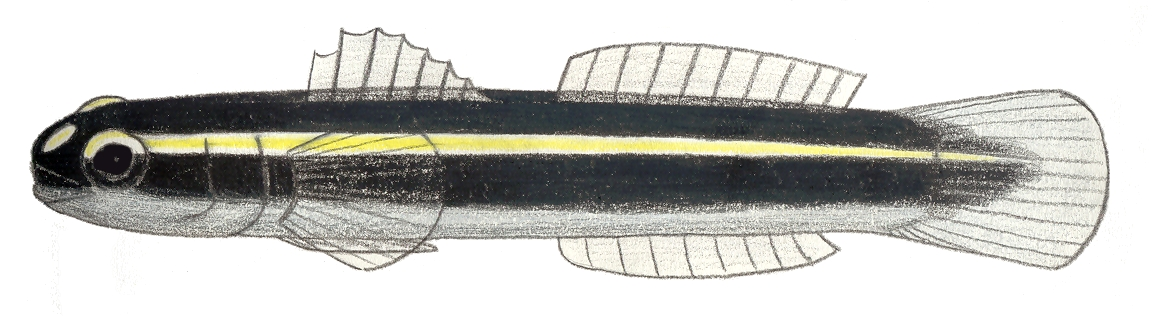
E. illecebrosum

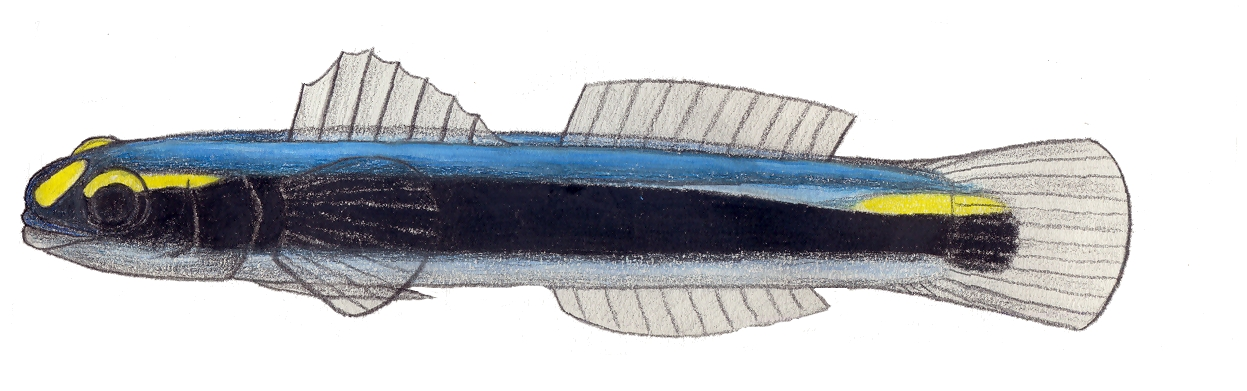
E. jarocho

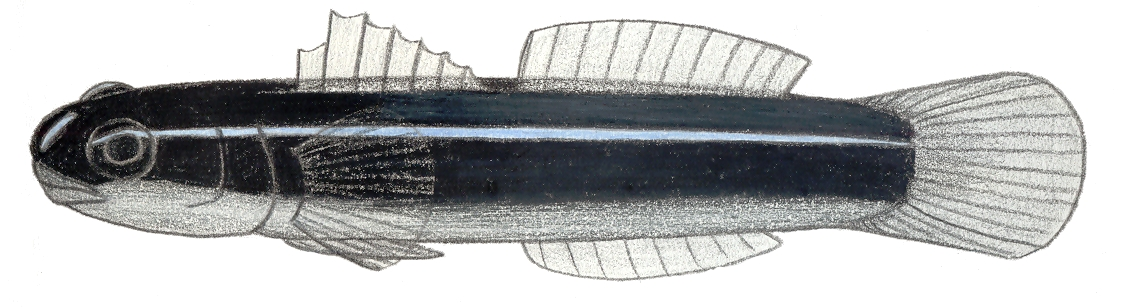
E. lori

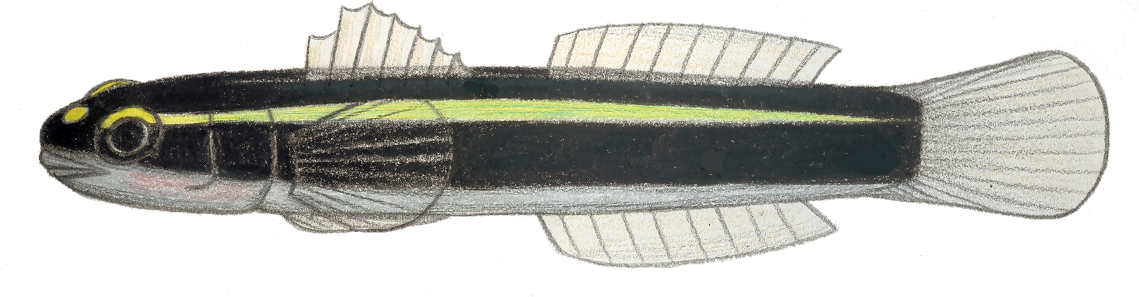
E. louisae

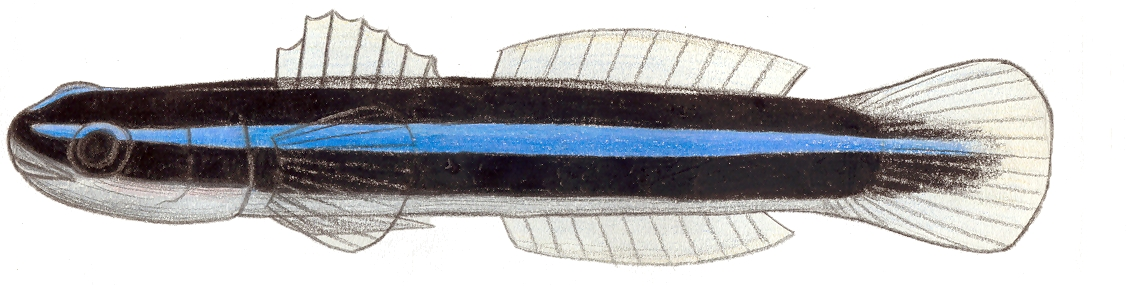
E. oceanops

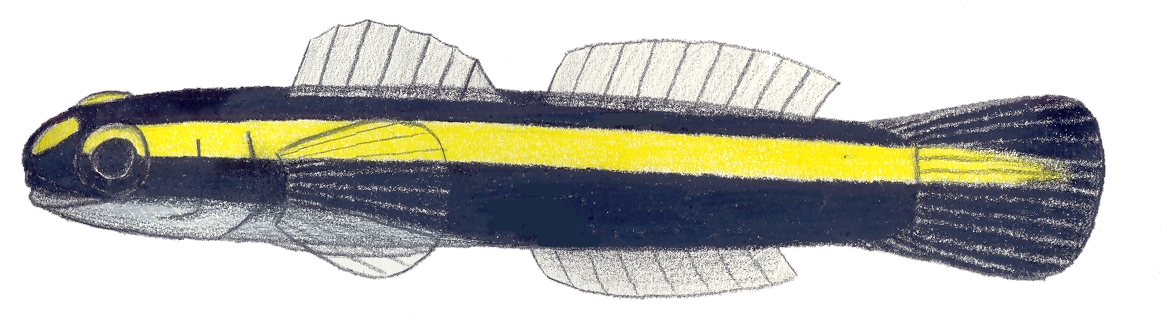
E. pridisi

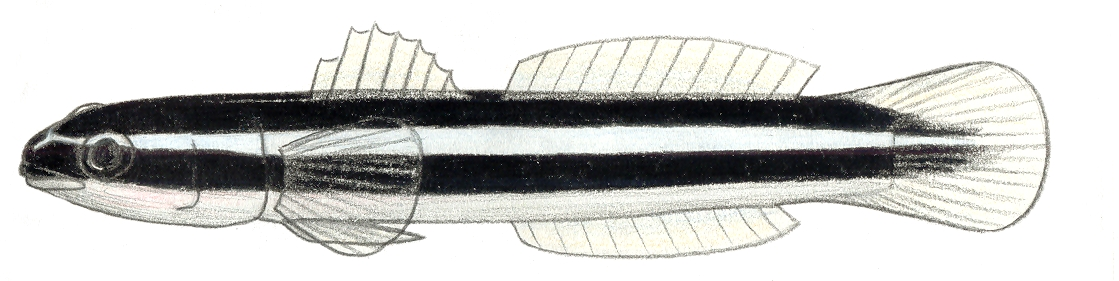
E. prochilos

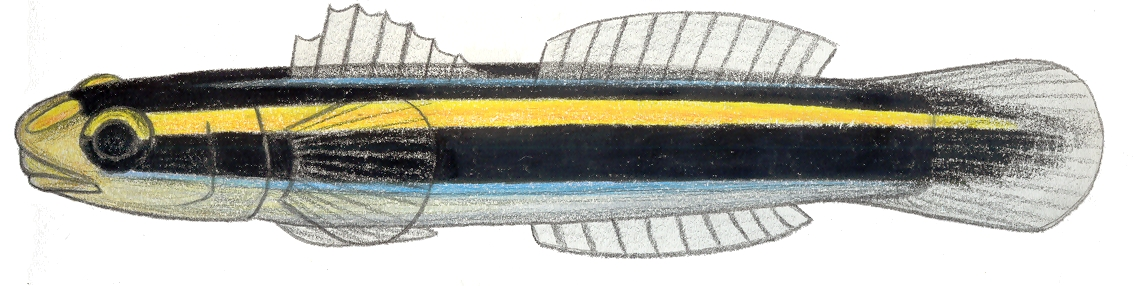
E. randalli

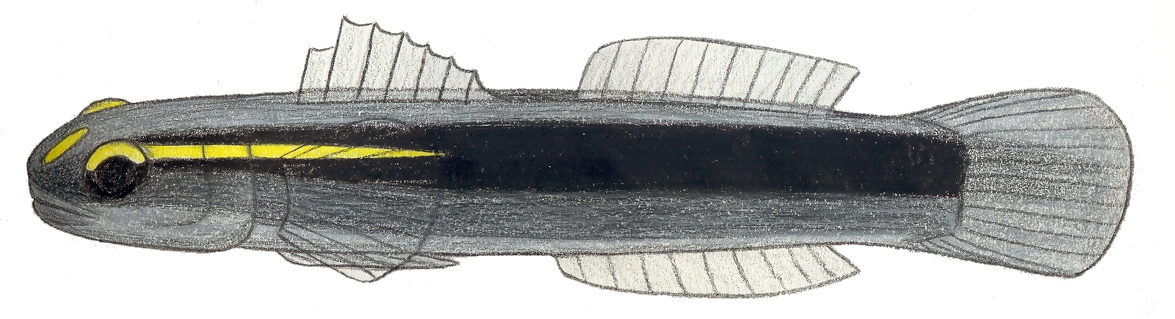
E. tenox

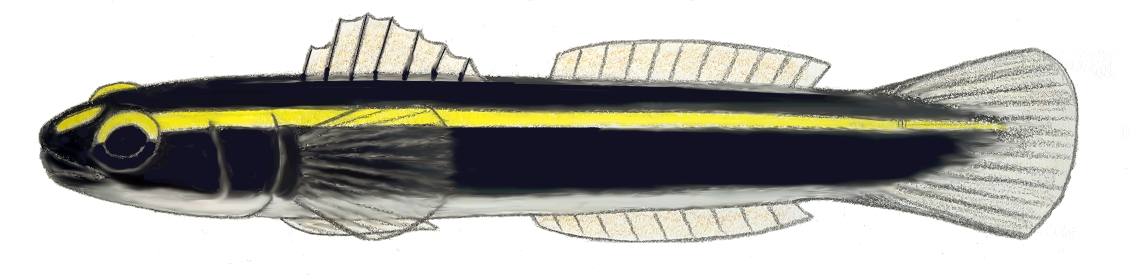
E. xanthiprora

Currently, 24 recognized species are placed in this genus:

- Elacatinus atronasus J. E. Böhlke & C. R. Robins, 1968
- Elacatinus cayman Victor, 2014 (Cayman cleaner goby)
- Elacatinus centralis Victor, 2014 (Cayman sponge goby)
- Elacatinus chancei Beebe & Hollister, 1933 (shortstripe goby)
- Elacatinus colini J. E. Randall & Lobel, 2009
- Elacatinus evelynae J. E. Böhlke & C. R. Robins, 1968 (sharknose goby, Caribbean cleaner goby)
- Elacatinus figaro I. Sazima (fr), R. L. Moura & R. de S. Rosa, 1997 (barber goby)
- Elacatinus genie J. E. Böhlke & C. R. Robins, 1968 (cleaner goby)
- Elacatinus horsti Metzelaar, 1922 (yellowline goby)
- Elacatinus illecebrosus (J. E. Böhlke & C. R. Robins, 1968) (barsnout goby)
- Elacatinus jarocho M. S. Taylor & Akins, 2007 (Jarocho goby)
- Elacatinus lobeli J. E. Randall & P. L. Colin, 2009
- Elacatinus lori P. L. Colin, 2002
- Elacatinus louisae J. E. Böhlke & C. R. Robins, 1968 (spotlight goby)
- Elacatinus oceanops D. S. Jordan, 1904 (neon goby)
- Elacatinus phthirophagus I. Sazima, Carvalho-Filho & C. Sazima, 2008 (Noronha cleaner goby)
- Elacatinus pridisi R. Z. P. Guimarães, Gasparini & L. A. Rocha, 2004
- Elacatinus prochilos J. E. Böhlke & C. R. Robins, 1968 (broadstripe goby)
- Elacatinus puncticulatus Ginsburg, 1938
- Elacatinus randalli J. E. Böhlke & C. R. Robins, 1968 (yellownose goby)
- Elacatinus redimiculus M. S. Taylor & Akins, 2007 (Cinta goby)
- Elacatinus serranilla J. E. Randall & P. L. Colin, 2009
- Elacatinus tenox J. E. Böhlke & C. R. Robins, 1968 (slaty goby)
- Elacatinus xanthiprora J. E. Böhlke & C. R. Robins, 1968 (yellowprow goby)

== Description ==
Neon gobies are very small, torpedo-shaped fish. Although sizes vary slightly by species, they are generally about 2.5 cm (0.98 in) long. They have dark bodies with iridescent stripes running from the tip of the nose to the base of the caudal fin. The color of the stripes varies by species. Like all gobies, their dorsal fin is split in two, the anterior dorsal fin being rounded like that of a clownfish and the posterior dorsal fin being relatively flat. The anal fin lines up with the posterior dorsal fin and is of similar shape. The pectoral fins are nearly circular, and, like all other fins, transparent.

== Distribution ==
Except for the East Pacific E. puncticulatus, all gobies of the genus Elacatinus reside in warmer parts of the western Atlantic, ranging from Florida and Bermuda, through the Bahamas, Caribbean and Gulf of Mexico to the coasts of Central America and northern South America (south to Brazil). Among the species is E. oceanops that resides in the Caribbean Sea, the Florida Keys and the Bahama Islands. They have been found along the northern Yucatan Peninsula.

== Diet ==
Elacatinus are generally carnivorous, with their primary diet consisting of ectoparasites on skins, fins, mouth and gill chambers of their clients. Depending on their ecological circumstances, they may also feed on zooplankton and non-parasitic copepods. Although they are carnivorous, Elacatinus occasionally consume algae and other plants as secondary food source.

== Physiology ==
=== Sex reversal ===
Some species of gobies exhibit gonochorism and protogynous hermaphroditism, including bidirectional sex reversal. Protogyny refers to a category of hermaphroditism where female organs develop or mature before the appearance of male product. In most males of Tellostei gobiidae, this characteristic is observed. Among those in the genus Elacatinus, protogyny is observed in E. illecebrosus. Protogynous hermaphroditism in gobies consists of a male reproductive system with paired, secretory, accessory gonadal structures (AGSs) associated with the testis. While the AGS is almost universally present in male gobies, protogynous females need to develop AGSs for sex reversal to take place. The AGSs develop from precursive tissues (pAGSs), in the form of bilateral, ventrally localized cell masses, located close to the junction of the ovarian lobes and the oviduct. At the time of sex change, it undergoes rapid growth and diverts to form the AGSs. When pAGSs develop into AGSs, ovigerous tissue is also completely replaced by seminiferous lobules. However, the ovarian lumen remains even after the sex change, functioning as a common spermatozoa collection region that is continuous with the common genital sinus as free spermatozoa travels from seminiferous lobules into the gonadal lumen.

Gonochorism refers to development or evolution of sex. Gonochoric goby species normally do not possess pAGSs, but pAGSs are observed in E. illecebrosus and E. evelynae. Specifically, the ovarian lobes of small-sized juvenile females of these species possess distinctive pAGSs that started to diminish and then disappeared as they approach adulthood.

== Development ==
Gobies are multiply spawning species, usually spawning from February to April. After spawning, male gobies guard and oxygenate eggs by frequent movement of their pectoral and caudal fins; males consume any eggs affected by fungus. However, after hatching, the larvae receive no parental protection. Around 30 days after hatching, the larvae begin metamorphosis into juvenile gobies.

== Behavior ==
=== Mating ===
Elacatinus species usually maintain social monogamy, a system in which heterosexual pairs remain closely associated during both reproductive and nonreproductive periods. Males and females of Elacatinus forage together, occupying a single cleaning station and servicing client fish in pairs. Such behavior observed in Elacatinus is attributed to low costs and high benefits for both sexes that result from being paired with a single, large partner. Males benefit from forming monogamous pairs with large females since they tend to have higher fecundity, while females are able to gain more resources by cleaning under the protection of a larger male. Females experience reduced cleaning rate overall when cleaning with a male. However, they spend more time in each cleaning session, so are able to feed on more ectoparasites compared to those with a smaller mate. If large body size also correlates with better paternal care is not confirmed, as it is difficult to observe caring behavior of Elacatinus whose males tend eggs that are laid deep within a small coral cavity. Intrasexual aggression used as a means to guard mates is proposed as a primary mechanism of maintaining monogamy. Both males and females were observed to be very aggressive toward same-sex intruders that come to their territory to accost their partners. However, several biological and ecological factors also enforce monogamy in these cleaner gobies. Elacatinus species reproduce asynchronously, which makes polygyny unfavorable. Furthermore, although it differs among species, cleaner gobies tend to live in environments of low population density where distance between potential mates is rather far. Although it is seldom, polygyny is observed in Elacatinus. Mated males may approach a new female if she is larger than their mate. Polygyny may also be exhibited in widowed males and females. When Elacatinus spp. are widowed, they often leave their cleaning territory. However, the vacant territory is not claimed by other cleaner gobies, which implies that the widowed gobies actually chose to move instead of being forced. This observation shows that the widowed gobies possibly have moved to search for new mate.

=== Mutualism ===
Mutualism refers to relationship where one or both partners provide a service or resources to the other. Caribbean cleaning gobies engage in mutualism by removing and feeding on ectoparasites on their clients. They present themselves and wait for clients at cleaning stations, as they largely depend on cleaning for their food. Elacatinus spp. often clean in pairs, where pairs are most often composed of a male and a female. Occupying the same territory, the cleaner pair usually cleans the same client at the same time.

Cleaning gobies generally service a wide range of clients; however, members of the genus Elacatinus are considered the most specialized cleaner gobies in tropical western Atlantic. Most frequent clients of Elacatinus include damselfish, Pomacentridae and Haemulidae, and planktivores. Rather than seeking their clients actively, they remain close to their cleaning station and seldom move more than a meter laterally. They do, however, dance in zig-zag swimming pattern to attract clients. Hosts come to the cleaning sites and pose to show their intent to receive service. Such poses are usually directed at the cleaning station rather than the individual gobies. However, not all the potential clients, or those that pose, are attended by cleaners. Duration of cleaning may range from a few seconds to almost half an hour. In observational studies, decreases in cleaning frequency turned out to be correlated to increases in cleaning durations. The rate of feeding and cleaning duration most likely reflect the number of parasites on clients' bodies.

=== Predator–prey relationship ===
Elacatinus has a unique response to predators' approach. Fish response to danger is largely classified into fight-or-flight or freezing. However, Elacatinus follows neither. It engages in cleaning interactions with potential predators sooner than with nonpredatory clients, treating them almost as soon as they arrive at their cleaning stations. Furthermore, Elacatinus species clean predators for longer durations. As implied by higher cortisol level in the cleaners when approached by predators, the fish do experience stress upon encountering predators, but unlike other fish that exhibit flight or freezing response, Elacatinus spp. demonstrates a proactive response. Elacatinus is thought to choose to be proactive, as cleaning predators faster makes them leave sooner, which in turn encourages nonpredatory clients to revisit cleaning stations. Moreover, such proactive response may serve as a pre-conflict management strategy that might result in safe outcome for interactions with certain predators.

=== Coloration ===
Common stripe patterns in Elacatinus include yellow, green, and blue; however, those possessing blue stripes were found to be most effective in attracting clients, as well as deterring predators. Four of six cleaner species of the genus Elacatinus display such coloration—E. oceanops, E. evelynae, E. genie, and E. prochilos. E. puncticulatus and E. nesiotes engage in cleaner activity, but do not possess blue stripes. One of the ways Elacatinus signals its clients is through unique blue stripes that distinguish them from their non-cleaning sister species; while their non-cleaning relatives possess yellow or green stripes that blend well with their sponge dwellings, cleaning Elacatinus spp. advertise their presence to potential clients by sitting on top of substrate such as coral. The characteristic blue stripe only observed in the cleaner lineage of gobies marks great contrast with the coral microhabitats compared to other stripe colors found in gobies, so allow them to be spotted easily. Blue stripes of Elacatinus play a role as signals for cooperation in addition to advertisement. Additionally, Elacatinus spp. possessing blue stripes deterred or survived significantly more attacks as compared to green and yellow gobies.

=== Cheating ===
Some Elacatinus cleaners cheat by feeding on scales and mucus of clients in addition to ectoparasites on their clients, which is confirmed by examination of their stomach contents. However, cheating may result in punishment. When clients realize that they are being cheated on, they interrupt the cleaning interaction and swim away or do not return to the gobies' cleaning station in the future, which may result in the cheater obtaining less resources than they could have obtained without cheating. This client behavior is similar to sanction strategy, where one partner restrains its biological investment. This strategy has been proven effective in keeping interspecies mutualism stable, and such cheating behavior is not readily observed in Elacatinus. They prefer to feed on ectoparasites over client mucus or scale. Therefore, they most likely cheat only when ectoparasites supply is depleted in clients.

== In the aquarium ==
Members of the genus Elacatinus, particularly E. oceanops, are among the most popular marine aquarium inhabitants.

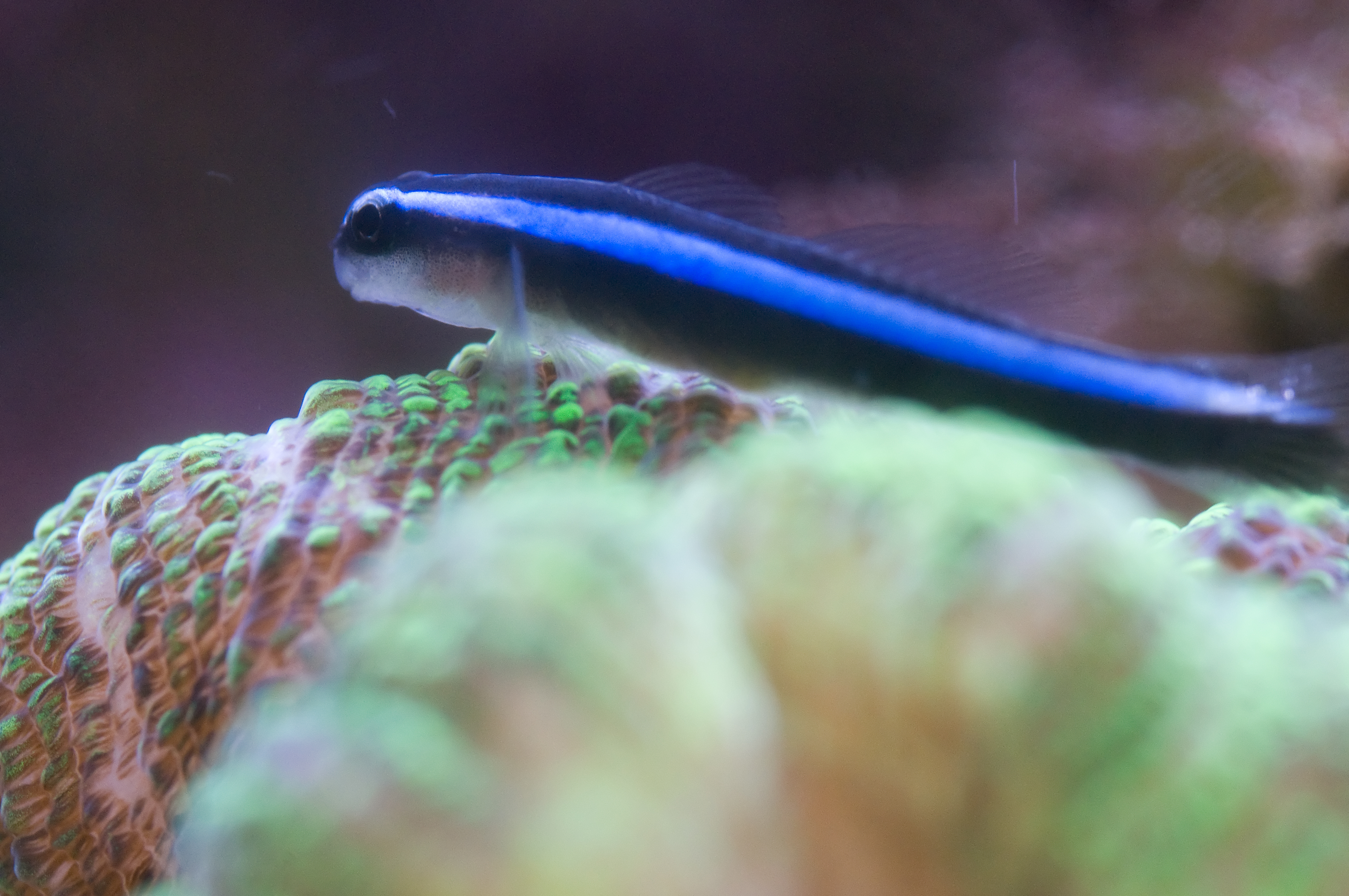
Neon goby (E. oceanops)

Several species of neon goby are readily available because of successful captive-breeding programs, although scientific names are not always given. Generally, if the specimen has a blue stripe, it can be identified as E. oceanops, and if the stripe is half-blue and half-gold, it is E. evelynae. Various species are offered as "gold neon gobies".

Neon gobies are not difficult to keep, and accept a wide variety of water parameters. Specific gravity is not critical, so long as it remains steady. As with all marine aquarium fish, they are sensitive to even trace amounts of ammonia or nitrite in an aquarium. Small amounts of nitrate are acceptable, but significant amounts over the long term can cause problems. Neon gobies are tolerant of a broad range of temperatures, but they are tropical, so a heater may be necessary to maintain a temperature of at least 25 °C (77 °F) year round. Other parameters, such as alkalinity, only become a problem if they are extreme.
