= Biemnidae =

Scientific classification
- Domain: Eukaryota
- Kingdom: Animalia
- Phylum: Porifera
- Class: Demospongiae
- Order: Biemnida
- Family: Biemnidae

Family of sponges

Biemnidae is a family of sponges belonging to the order Biemnida.

Genera:

- Biemna Gray, 1867
- Neofibularia Hechtel, 1965
- Sigmaxinella Dendy, 1897
