= Biemnida =

Scientific classification
- Kingdom: Animalia
- Phylum: Porifera
- Class: Demospongiae
- Subclass: Heteroscleromorpha
- Order: Biemnida; Morrow, 2013

Families
- Biemnidae Hentschel, 1923; Rhabderemiidae Topsent, 1928

Order of sponges

Biemnida is an order of demosponges in the subclass Heteroscleromorpha.
