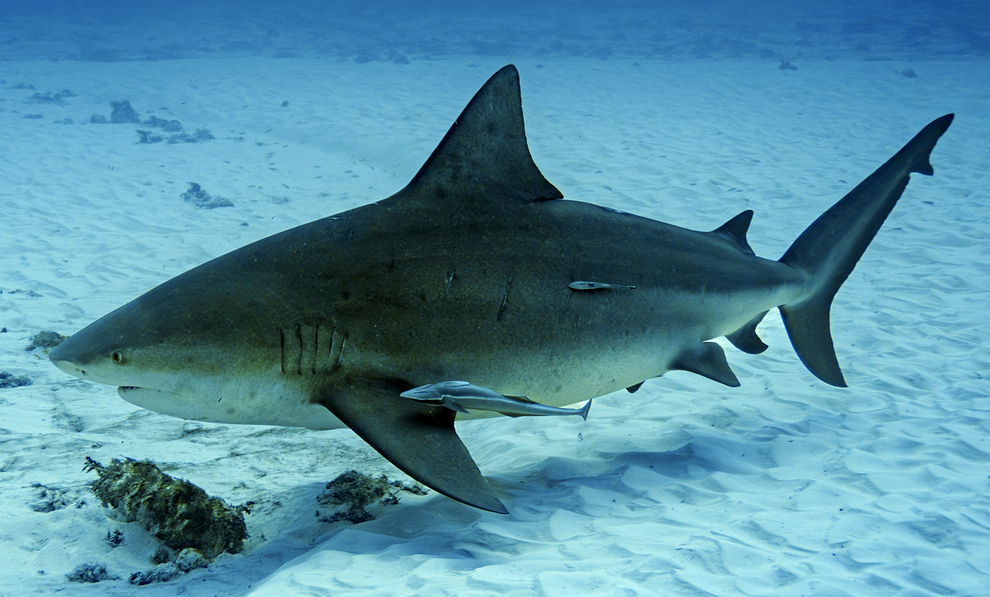
- Bull shark off Playa del Carmen, Mexico
- Size compared to an average human diver

Conservation status
- Vulnerable (IUCN 3.1)

Scientific classification
- Kingdom: Animalia
- Phylum: Chordata
- Class: Chondrichthyes
- Subclass: Elasmobranchii
- Division: Selachii
- Order: Carcharhiniformes
- Family: Carcharhinidae
- Genus: Carcharhinus
- Species: C. leucas

Binomial name
- Carcharhinus leucas (J. P. Müller & Henle, 1839)
- native range

= Bull shark =

Bull shark Temporal range: Early Miocene–present

Species of fish

The bull shark (Carcharhinus leucas), also known as the Zambezi shark (informally zambi) in Africa and Lake Nicaragua shark in Nicaragua, is a species of requiem shark commonly found worldwide in warm, shallow waters along coasts and in rivers. It is known for its aggressive nature, and presence mainly in warm, shallow brackish and freshwater systems including estuaries and (usually) lower reaches of rivers. Their aggressive nature has led to ongoing shark-culling efforts near beaches to protect beachgoers, which is one of the causes of bull shark populations continuing to decrease. Bull sharks are listed as vulnerable on the IUCN Red List.

Bull sharks are euryhaline and can thrive in both salt and fresh water. They are known to travel far up rivers, and have been known to travel up the Mississippi River as far as Alton, Illinois, about 1,100 kilometres (700 mi) from the ocean, but few freshwater interactions with humans have been recorded. Larger-sized bull sharks are responsible for a large part of nearshore shark attacks, and may be responsible for many attacks involving unidentified species.

Unlike the river sharks of the genus Glyphis, bull sharks are not true freshwater sharks, despite their ability to survive in freshwater habitats.

This shark appears in the image of the 2000 colones banknote from Costa Rica.

== Etymology ==
The name "bull shark" comes from the shark's stocky shape, broad, flat snout, and aggressive, unpredictable behavior. In India, the bull shark may be confused with the Sundarbans or Ganges shark. In Africa, it is also commonly called the Zambezi River shark, or just "zambi".

Its wide range and diverse habitats result in many other local names, including Ganges River shark, Fitzroy Creek whaler, van Rooyen's shark, Lake Nicaragua shark, river shark, freshwater whaler, estuary whaler, Swan River whaler, cub shark, and shovelnose shark.

== Evolution ==
Some of the bull shark's closest living relatives do not have the capabilities of osmoregulation. Its genus, Carcharhinus, also includes the sandbar shark, which is not capable of osmoregulation.

The bull shark shares numerous similarities with river sharks of the genus Glyphis, such as its ability to inhabit freshwater. However, the two genera have distinct taxonomic placements within the Carcharhinidae, with the bull shark being nested within the genus Carcharhinus, while the river sharks are sister to the genus Lamiopsis. This suggests that their similar physiologies convergently evolved.

The earliest fossil teeth of the bull shark are known from the Early Miocene of Egypt and Peru. They start to become much more widespread in geologic formations worldwide from the Middle Miocene onwards.

== Anatomy and appearance ==
Bull sharks are large and stout, with females being larger than males. The bull shark can be up to 81 cm (2 ft 8 in) in length at birth. Adult female bull sharks average 2.4 m (8 ft) long and typically weigh 130 kg (290 lb), whereas the slightly smaller adult male averages 2.25 m (7 ft) and 95 kg (209 lb). While a maximum size of 3.5 m (11 ft) is commonly reported, a single record exists of a female specimen of exactly 4.0 m (13 ft). A 3.25 m (10.7 ft) long pregnant individual reached 450 kg (990 lb). The maximum weight of the 4.0 m (13 ft) long pregnant female can be over 600 kg (1,300 lb), ranking it among the largest of the requiem sharks. Bull sharks are wider and heavier than other requiem sharks of comparable length, and are grey on top and white below. The second dorsal fin is smaller than the first. The bull shark's caudal fin is longer and lower than that of the larger sharks, and it has a small snout, and lacks an interdorsal ridge.

Bull sharks have a bite force up to 5,914 newtons (1,330 lbf), weight for weight the highest among all investigated cartilaginous fishes.

A female Bull Shark in Fiji

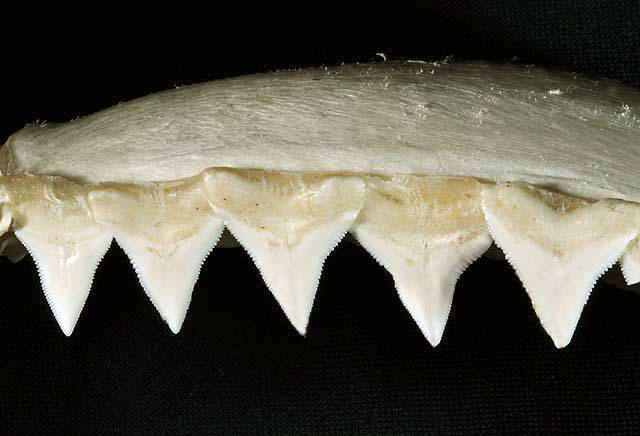
Upper teeth

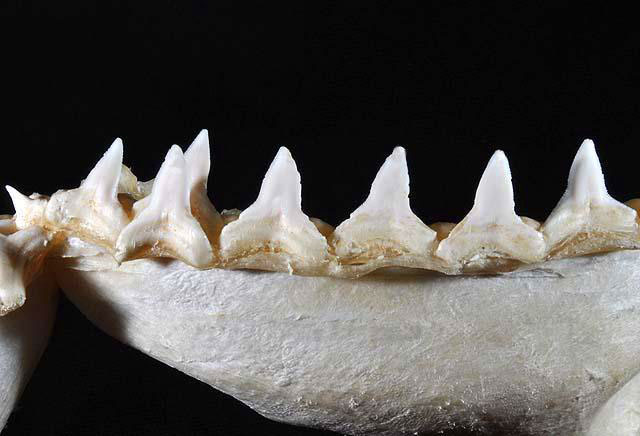
Lower teeth

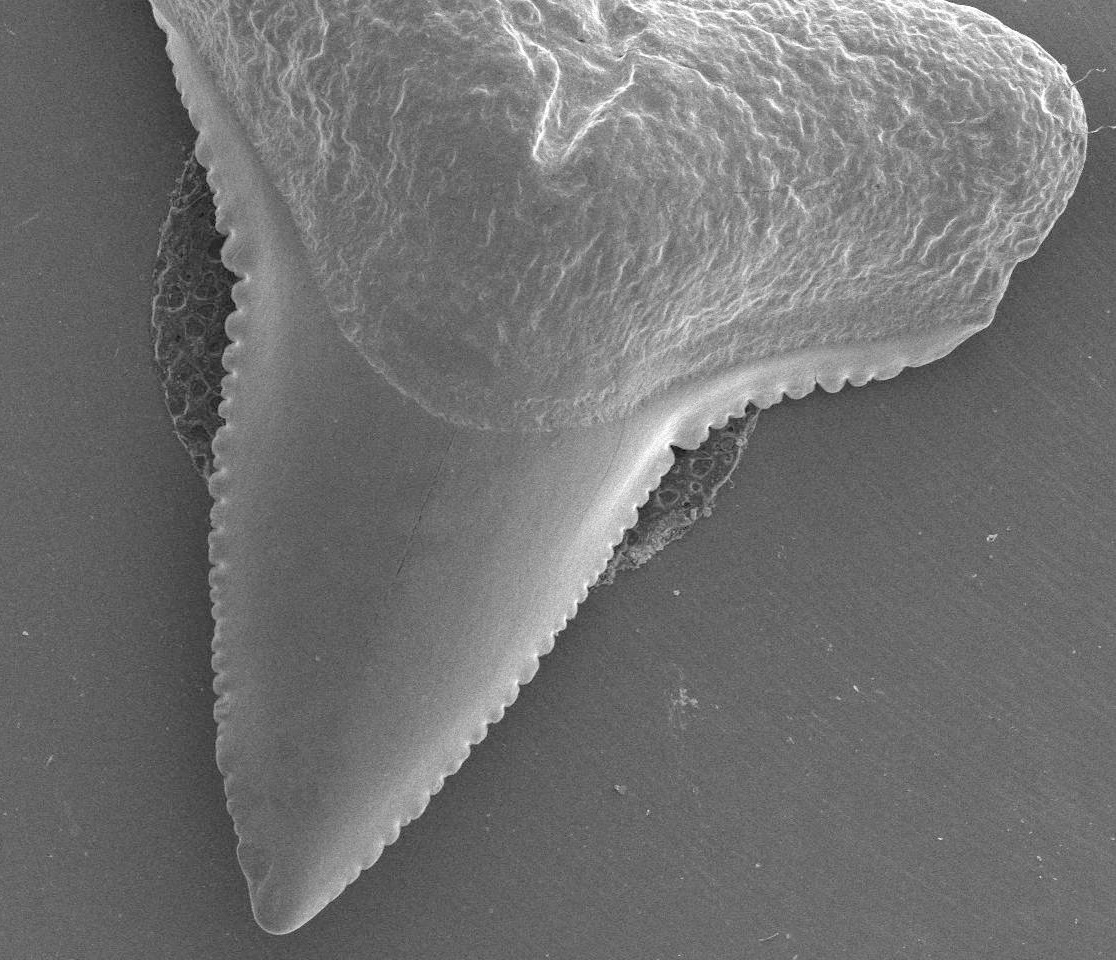
Electron micrograph of an upper tooth

=== Exceptional specimens ===
In early June 2012, off the coast of the Florida Keys near the western part of the Atlantic Ocean, a female believed to measure at least 2.4 m (8 ft) and 360–390 kg (800–850 lb) was caught by members of the R.J. Dunlap Marine Conservation Program. In the Arabian Sea, off the coast of Fujairah in the United Arab Emirates, a pregnant shark weighing 347.8 kg (767 lb) and measuring 3 m (10 ft) long was caught in February 2019, followed by another specimen weighing about 350 kg (770 lb) and measuring about the same in length, in January 2020. Unconfirmed reports suggest that the very largest, exceptional specimens can possibly weigh up to 900 kg (2,000 lb).

== Distribution and habitat ==
The bull shark is commonly found worldwide in coastal areas of warm oceans, in rivers and lakes, and occasionally salt and freshwater streams if they are deep enough. It is found to a depth of 150 m (490 ft), but does not usually swim deeper than 30 m (98 ft). In the Atlantic, it is found from Massachusetts to southern Brazil, and from Morocco to Angola.

Populations of bull sharks are also found in several major rivers, with more than 500 bull sharks thought to be living in the Brisbane River. One was reportedly seen swimming the flooded streets of Brisbane, Queensland, Australia, during the 2010–11 Queensland floods. Several were sighted in one of the main streets of Goodna, Queensland, shortly after the peak of the January 2011, floods. A large bull shark was caught in the canals of Scarborough, just north of Brisbane within Moreton Bay. Still greater numbers are in the canals of the Gold Coast, Queensland. In the warmer months of the year, bull sharks frequent Sydney Harbour. In the Pacific Ocean, it can be found from Baja California to Ecuador.

The bull shark has traveled 4,000 km (2,500 mi) up the Amazon River to Iquitos in Peru and north Bolivia. It also lives in freshwater Lake Nicaragua, in the Ganges and Brahmaputra Rivers of West Bengal, and Assam in Eastern India and adjoining Bangladesh. It can live in water with a high salt content as in St. Lucia Estuary in South Africa. Bull sharks have been recorded in the Tigris River since at least 1924 as far upriver as Baghdad, and has been rumored to also inhabit the Cahora Bassa lake upstream of the Zambezi. The species has a distinct preference for warm currents.

After Hurricane Katrina, many bull sharks were sighted in Lake Pontchartrain. In July 2023 some local fishermen in the Atchafalaya River have reported increasing numbers. Bull sharks have occasionally gone as far upstream in the Mississippi River as Alton, Illinois. Bull sharks have also been found in the Potomac River in St. Mary's County, Maryland. From 1996 to 2013, a golf course lake at Carbrook, Logan City, Queensland, Australia was the home to several bull sharks. They were trapped following a flood of the Logan and Albert Rivers in 1996, and resided in the 51 acres (21 ha) lake until 2013, when they disappeared after another series of floods. The golf course capitalized on the novelty, changing their logo to feature the sharks and hosting a monthly tournament called the "Shark Lake Challenge".

== Behavior ==
=== Freshwater tolerance ===
The bull shark is the best known of 43 species of elasmobranch, across 10 genera and four families, to have been reported in fresh and/or brackish water. Other species that enter rivers include the stingrays (Dasyatidae, Potamotrygonidae and others) and sawfish (Pristidae). Some skates (Rajidae), smooth dogfishes (Triakidae), and sandbar sharks (Carcharhinus plumbeus) regularly enter estuaries.

The bull shark is diadromous, meaning they can swim between salt and fresh water with ease, as they are euryhaline fish—able to quickly adapt to a wide range of salinities. Thus, the bull shark is one of the few cartilaginous fishes that have been reported in freshwater systems. Many of the euryhaline fish are bony fishes, such as salmon or tilapia, and are not closely related to bull sharks. Evolutionary assumptions can be made to help explain this sort of evolutionary disconnect, with one being that the bull shark experienced a population bottleneck during the last ice age. This bottleneck may have separated the bull shark from the rest of the Elasmobranchii subclass and favored the genes for an osmoregulatory system.

Elasmobranchs' ability to enter fresh water is limited because their blood is normally at least as salty (in terms of osmotic strength) as seawater through the accumulation of urea and trimethylamine oxide, but bull sharks living in fresh water show a significantly reduced concentration of urea within their blood. Despite this, the solute composition (i.e. osmolarity) of a bull shark in fresh water is still much higher than that of the external environment. This results in a large influx of water across the gills due to osmosis and loss of sodium and chloride from the shark's body. However, bull sharks in fresh water possess several organs with which to maintain appropriate salt and water balance; these are the rectal gland, kidneys, liver, and gills. All elasmobranchs have a rectal gland which functions in the excretion of excess salts accumulated as a consequence of living in seawater. Bull sharks in freshwater environments decrease the salt-excretory activity of the rectal gland, thereby conserving sodium and chloride. The kidneys produce large amounts of dilute urine, but also play an important role in the active reabsorption of solutes into the blood. The gills of bull sharks are likely to be involved in the uptake of sodium and chloride from the surrounding fresh water, whereas urea is produced in the liver as required with changes in environmental salinity. Recent work also shows that the differences in density of fresh water to that of marine waters result in significantly greater negative buoyancies in sharks occupying fresh water, resulting in increasing costs of living in fresh water. Bull sharks caught in freshwater have subsequently been shown to have lower liver densities than sharks living in marine waters. This may reduce the added cost of greater negative buoyancy.

Bull sharks are able to regulate themselves to live in either fresh or salt water. It can live in fresh water for its entire life, but this does not happen, mostly due to the reproductive needs of the shark. Young bull sharks leave the brackish water in which they are born and move out into the sea to breed. While is theoretically possible for bull sharks to live purely in fresh water, experiments conducted on bull sharks found that they died within four years. The stomach was opened and all that was found were two small, unidentifiable fishes. The cause of death could have been starvation since the primary food source for bull sharks resides in salt water.

In a research experiment, the bull sharks were found to be at the mouth of an estuary for the majority of the time. They stayed at the mouth of the river independent of the salinity of the water. The driving factor for a bull shark to be in fresh or salt water, however, is its age; as the bull shark ages, its tolerance for very low or high salinity increases. The majority of the newborn or very young bull sharks were found in the freshwater area, whereas the much older bull sharks were found to be in the saltwater areas, as they had developed a much better tolerance for the salinity. Reproduction is one of the reasons why adult bull sharks travel into the river—it is thought to be a physiological strategy to improve juvenile survival and a way to increase overall fitness of bull sharks. The young are not born with a high tolerance for high salinity, so they are born in fresh water and stay there until they are able to travel out.

Initially, scientists thought the sharks in Lake Nicaragua belonged to an endemic species, the Lake Nicaragua shark (Carcharhinus nicaraguensis). In 1961, following specimen comparisons, taxonomists synonymized them. Bull sharks tagged inside the lake have later been caught in the open ocean (and vice versa), with some taking as few as seven to 11 days to complete the journey.

A study of six bull sharks confined to a stagnant golf course lake in Brisbane, Australia, from 1996 to 2013 uncovered their adaptability to low-salinity environments, marking the longest recorded residency for the species under such conditions, and demonstrating their ability to live indefinitely in low-salinity aquatic environments.

=== Diet ===
The bull shark is a marine apex predator, capable of taking a variety of prey. The bull shark's diet consists mainly of bony fish and small sharks, including other bull sharks, and stingrays. Their diet can also include turtles, birds, dolphins, terrestrial mammals, crustaceans, and echinoderms. They hunt in murky waters where it is harder for the prey to see the shark coming. Bull sharks have been known to use the bump-and-bite technique to attack their prey. After the first initial contact, they continue to bite and tackle prey until the prey is unable to flee.

The bull shark is a solitary hunter, though may briefly pair with another bull shark to make hunting and tricking prey easier.

Sharks are opportunistic feeders, and the bull shark is no exception to this, as it is part of the Carcharhinus family of sharks. Normally, sharks eat in short bursts, and when food is scarce, sharks digest for a much longer period of time in order to avoid starvation. As part of their survival mechanism, bull sharks will regurgitate the food in their stomachs in order to escape from a predator. This is a distraction tactic; if the predator moves to eat the regurgitated food the bull shark can use the opportunity to escape.

=== Reproduction ===
Bull sharks mate during late summer and early autumn, often in bays and estuaries. After gestating for 12 months, a bull shark may give birth to 1 to 13 live young.

They are viviparous, born live and free-swimming. The young are about 70 cm (27.6 in) at birth. The bull shark does not rear its young; the young bull sharks are born into flat, protected areas. Coastal lagoons, river mouths, and other low-salinity estuaries are common nursery habitats.

The male bull shark is able to begin reproducing around the age of 15, while the female cannot begin reproducing until 18. The size of a fully matured female bull shark able to produce viable eggs for fertilization seems to be 175 cm to 235 cm. The courting routine between bull sharks has not yet been observed in detail. The male likely bites the female on the tail until she turns upside down and the male then copulates. Mature females commonly have scratches from the mating process.

=== Interactions with humans ===
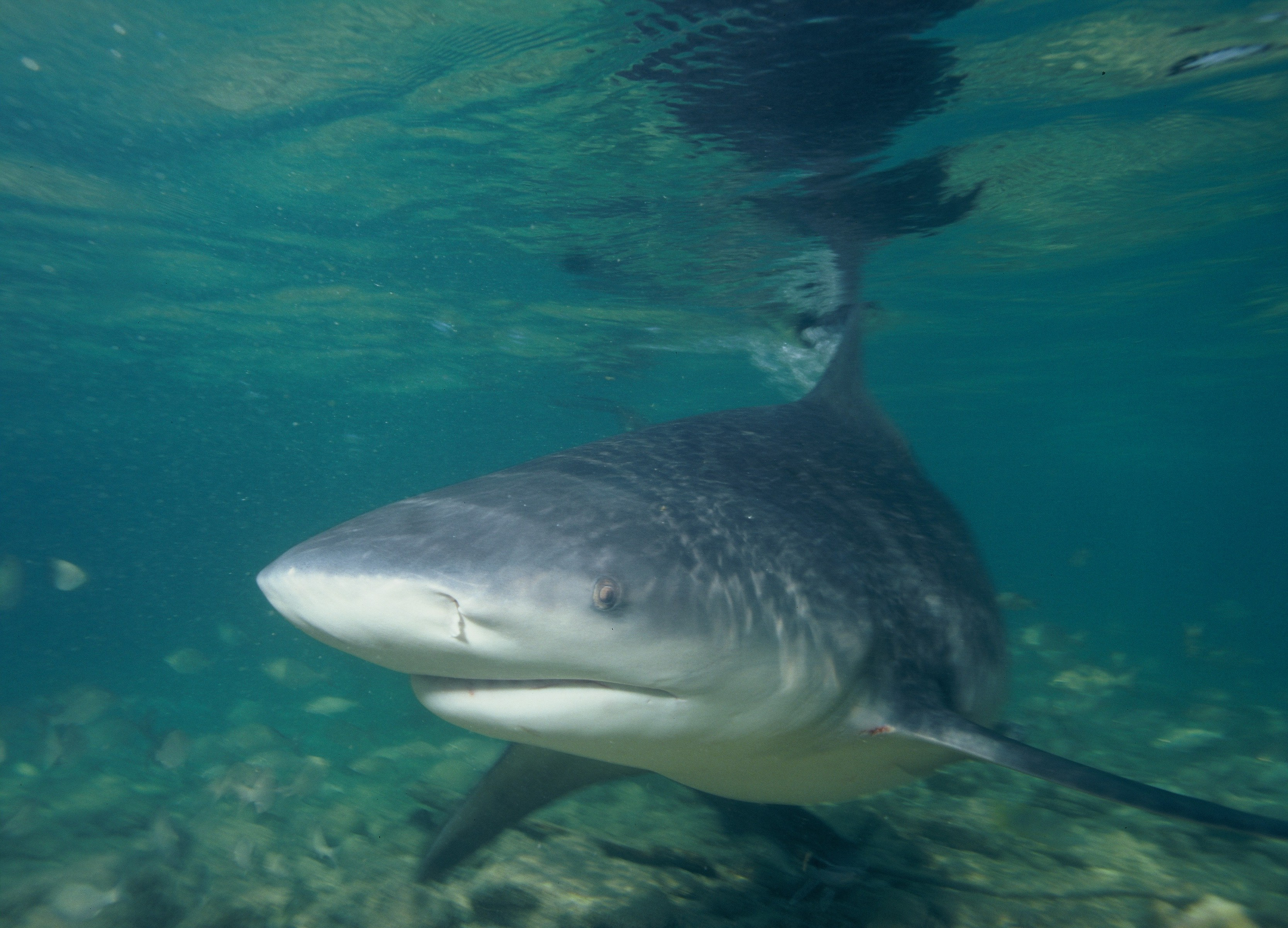
Bull shark (Bahamas)

Since bull sharks often dwell in very shallow waters, are found in many types of habitats, are territorial by nature, and have no tolerance for provocation, they may be more dangerous to humans than any other species of shark. Bull sharks are one of the three shark species (along with the tiger shark and great white shark) most likely to bite humans.

One or more bull sharks may have been involved in the Jersey Shore shark attacks of 1916. While it is a common misconception that these attacks were the inspiration for the novel Jaws, its author Peter Benchley has stated this is not the case. The speculation that bull sharks may have been responsible is based on two fatal bites occurring in brackish and fresh water.

Bull sharks have attacked swimmers around the Sydney Harbour inlets. In India, bull sharks swim up the Ganges, Bramaputra, Mahanadi, and other Indian rivers and have bitten bathers. Many of these bite incidents were attributed to the Ganges shark, Glyphis gangeticus, a critically endangered river shark species, although the sand tiger shark was also blamed during the 1960s and 1970s.

Bull sharks have also attacked humans off the coast of Florida.

=== Visual cues ===
Behavioral studies have confirmed that sharks can take visual cues to discriminate between different objects. The bull shark is able to discriminate between colors of mesh netting that is present underwater. It was found that bull sharks tended to avoid mesh netting of bright colors rather than colors that blended in with the water. Bright yellow mesh netting was found to be easily avoided when it was placed in the path of the bull shark. This was found to be the reason that sharks are attracted to bright yellow survival gear rather than ones that were painted black.

=== Energy conservation ===
In 2008, researchers tagged and recorded the movements of young bull sharks in the Caloosahatchee River estuary. They were testing to find out what determined the movement of the young bull sharks. It was found that the young bull sharks synchronously moved downriver when the environmental conditions changed. This large movement of young bull sharks were found to be moving as a response rather than other external factors such as predators. The movement was found to be directly related to the bull shark conserving energy for itself. One way the bull shark is able to conserve energy is that when the tidal flow changes, the bull shark uses the tidal flow in order to conserve energy as it moves downriver. Another way for the bull shark to conserve energy is to decrease the amount of energy needed to osmoregulate the surrounding environment.

== Ecology ==
Humans are the biggest threat to bull sharks. Larger sharks, such as the tiger shark and great white shark, may attack them, but typically only target juveniles. Crocodiles may be a threat to bull sharks in rivers. Saltwater crocodiles have been observed preying on bull sharks in the rivers and estuaries of Northern Australia, and a Nile crocodile was reportedly sighted consuming a bull shark in South Africa.

== Conservation ==
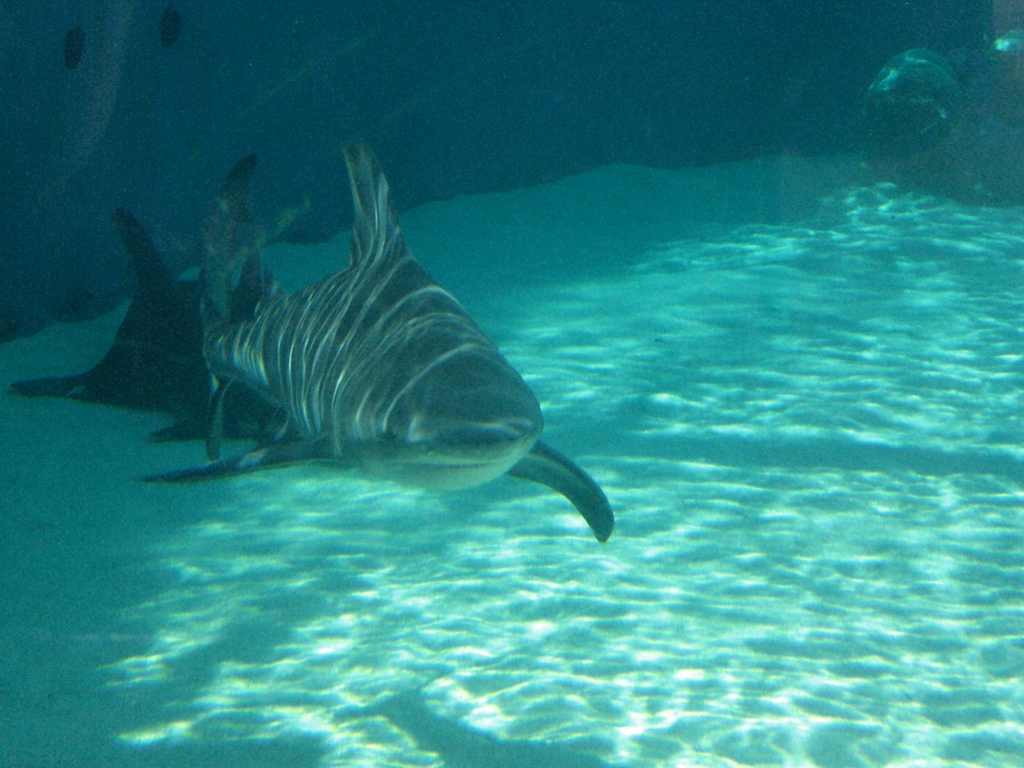
Bull shark in the Aquarium of the Pacific's Shark Lagoon exhibit

The bull shark is listed as a vulnerable species on the IUCN Red List and its population is decreasing. Despite its status, the species isn't named as a protected species. Threats to the bull shark are numerous, such as getting caught in fishing nets, overfishing for their oil, skin, and meat, pollution to their habitat, and more. In many areas of the world, including Australia and South Africa, there are shark-culling measures around beaches to prevent attacks on beach-goers. Researchers tried to fix the problem of sharks getting too close to land by testing out a device called the SharkSafe Barrier™. This barrier used magnetic and visual stimuli, which utilized rows of piping to create a continuous magnetic field to deter the sharks. However, researchers concluded that the technology needs to be improved and tested further before it can be implemented as a reliable safety measure. Other research is being conducted to come up with conservation solutions for the bull sharks. One example is The Nature Conservancy satellite tagging sharks to track their migration and find their habitats in order to guide what areas require further protection projects.

== See also ==
- Outline of sharks
- List of sharks
- List of fatal, unprovoked shark attacks in the United States by decade

== Sources ==
- "Carcharhinus leucas". Integrated Taxonomic Information System.
- Froese, Rainer; Pauly, Daniel (eds.). "Carcharhinus leucas". FishBase. September 2005 version.
- Bull shark, Carcharhinus leucas at marinebio.org
- Sunday Herald Sun, Sunday, 23 April 2005
