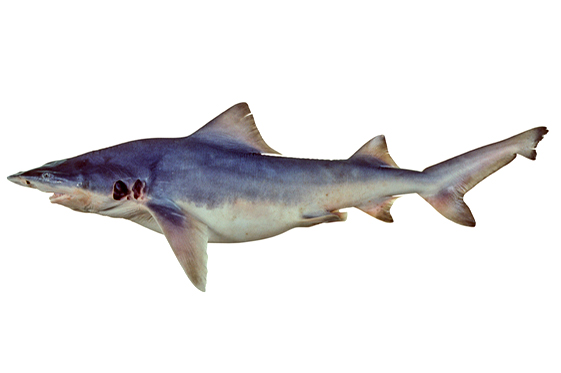

Conservation status
- Vulnerable (IUCN 3.1)

Scientific classification
- Kingdom: Animalia
- Phylum: Chordata
- Class: Chondrichthyes
- Subclass: Elasmobranchii
- Division: Selachii
- Order: Carcharhiniformes
- Family: Carcharhinidae
- Genus: Glyphis
- Species: G. garricki

Binomial name
- Glyphis garricki Compagno, W. T. White & Last, 2008
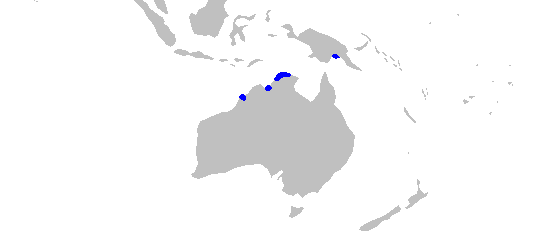
- Range of the northern river shark

= Northern river shark =

Species of shark

The northern river shark or New Guinea river shark (Glyphis garricki) is a species of requiem shark, in the family Carcharhinidae, found in scattered tidal rivers and associated coastal waters in northern Australia and in Papua New Guinea. This species inhabits areas with poor visibility, soft bottoms, and large tides, with immature sharks ranging into fresh and brackish water. It is similar to other river sharks in having a stocky grey body with a high back, tiny eyes, and broad fins. It measures up to 2.5 m (8.2 ft) long.

Northern river sharks are likely piscivorous. This species is viviparous, with females bearing litters of 9 young possibly every other year before the wet season. Very rare and facing threats from commercial and recreational fishing, and perhaps also habitat degradation, this species has been assessed as Vulnerable by the International Union for Conservation of Nature.

== Taxonomy ==
The first known specimens of the northern river shark, two newborn males from Papua New Guinea, were discovered by New Zealand ichthyologist Jack Garrick, after whom the species was eventually named. This shark was referred to as "Glyphis sp. C" until 2008, when it was formally described by Leonard Compagno, William White, and Peter R. Last in a Commonwealth Scientific and Industrial Research Organisation paper. The type specimen is a female 67 cm (26 in) long, collected from the East Alligator River, Kakadu National Park, Northern Territory.

== Distribution and habitat ==
The northern river shark has been reported from King Sound, the Ord River, and Doctors Creek near Derby, Western Australia, the Adelaide and Alligator Rivers in Australia's Northern Territory, and the Daru region and possibly the Fly River in Papua New Guinea. It inhabits large rivers, estuaries, and coastal bays, all of which are characterized by high turbidity, silty or muddy bottoms, and large tides. Young and juvenile sharks are found in fresh, brackish, and salt water (salinity ranging from 2 to 36 ppt), whereas adults have only been found in marine environments.

== Description ==
Like other members of its genus, the northern river shark has a stocky body with a high back. The head is wide and flattened, with a broadly rounded snout and minute eyes equipped with nictitating membranes. Each nostril is divided into a very large incurrent opening and a small excurrent opening by a triangular skin flap. The sizable mouth is broadly arched, with short furrows at the corners. 31 to 34 tooth rows are in the upper jaw and 30–35 tooth rows are in the lower jaw; the upper teeth are upright and triangular with serrated edges, while the lower teeth are narrower and straight to slightly curved. In the largest individuals, the first few lower teeth from the jaw median are spear-shaped with serrations near the tip.

The pectoral fins are large and broad, with gently backward-curving margins and pointed tips. The pelvic fins are triangular with nearly straight trailing margins. The first dorsal fin is long-based and triangular, with the apex almost forming a right angle; the second dorsal fin is some two-thirds as high as the first. The origin of the first dorsal fin lies over the pectoral fin insertions, while that of second dorsal fin lies over the pelvic fin rear tips. No ridge exists between the dorsal fins. The anal fin is smaller than the second dorsal fin and has a strong notch in the rear margin. The caudal fin has a strong lower lobe and a long, narrow upper lobe with a ventral notch near the tip. The dermal denticles are small, oval, and overlapping, bearing three horizontal ridges leading to marginal teeth. This shark is steel-gray above and white below; the colour transition is sharp, located well below the eye, and becomes jagged on the sides of the trunk. The anal and caudal fins become dusky or black towards the trailing margins and tips. The maximum known length is 2.5 m (8.2 ft). This species differs from the speartooth shark (G. glyphis) in several morphological and meristic characters, including having fewer vertebrae (137–151 versus 213–222) and a lower, jagged gray-white colour boundary.

== Biology and ecology ==
With its slender teeth, small eyes, and high density of ampullae of Lorenzini, the northern river shark seems to be adapted for hunting fish in conditions of poor visibility. In Doctors Creek, sharks may move to and from favored feeding areas with the tide. Like other requiem sharks, this species is viviparous, with the developing embryos forming a placental connection to their mother after exhausting their supply of yolk. Females give birth around October, before the start of the wet season, on possibly a biennial cycle. One female examined contained nine fetuses. The young are born at under 67 cm (26 in) long; males mature between lengths of 1.2 and 1.4 m (3.9 and 4.6 ft), while females mature between lengths of 1.4 and 1.7 m (4.6 and 5.6 ft).

== Human interactions ==
The northern river shark appears to be extremely rare, though more subpopulations may remain to be discovered in Australia and Papua New Guinea. Based on present information, no more than 250 mature individuals are estimated to exist in the wild, with no more than 50 in any particular subpopulation. This species is caught legally and illegally by commercial fisheries using longlines and gillnets, as well as by recreational fishers; habitat degradation may pose a further threat to its survival. Because of its low natural abundance, limited distribution, stringent habitat requirements, and susceptibility to various human-caused threats, the IUCN has assessed the northern river shark as Vulnerable. It has also been listed as endangered on the 1999 Commonwealth Environment Protection and Biodiversity Conservation Act, and on the 2000 Territory Parks and Wildlife Conservation Act. Kakadu National Park may be an important protected area for this species. No regulations restrict the capture of this species in Papua New Guinea.
