= Glyphis =

Glyphis may refer to:

- Glyphis (lichen), a genus of lichens in the family Graphidaceae
- Glyphis (shark), a genus of river sharks from Southeast Asia and Australia
