= Glyphis hastalis =

Glyphis hastalis Temporal range: Early Eocene, 54–50 Ma

Scientific classification
- Kingdom: Animalia
- Phylum: Chordata
- Class: Chondrichthyes
- Subclass: Elasmobranchii
- Division: Selachii
- Order: Carcharhiniformes
- Family: Carcharhinidae
- Genus: Glyphis
- Species: †G. hastalis

Binomial name
- †Glyphis hastalis Agassiz, 1843

Synonyms
- Carcharias (Prionodon) hastalis

Extinct species of shark

Glyphis hastalis is a dubious species of extinct river shark from the Early Eocene of England. Fossil teeth have been identified from the London Clay. The type specimens are two isolated teeth that resemble the lower teeth of the modern speartooth shark. It is the type species of the genus Glyphis, represented by modern relatives such as the Ganges shark and speartooth shark. However, other authorities have found that its classification into the genus Glyphis is likely erroneous.
