= Glyphis pagoda =

Glyphis pagoda Temporal range: Miocene

Scientific classification
- Domain: Eukaryota
- Kingdom: Animalia
- Phylum: Chordata
- Class: Chondrichthyes
- Subclass: Elasmobranchii
- Division: Selachii
- Order: Carcharhiniformes
- Family: Carcharhinidae
- Genus: Glyphis
- Species: G. pagoda

Binomial name
- Glyphis pagoda (Noetling, 1901)

Extinct species of shark

Glyphis pagoda is an extinct river shark from the Miocene.

== Fossil locations ==
Fossils are found in Myanmar.
