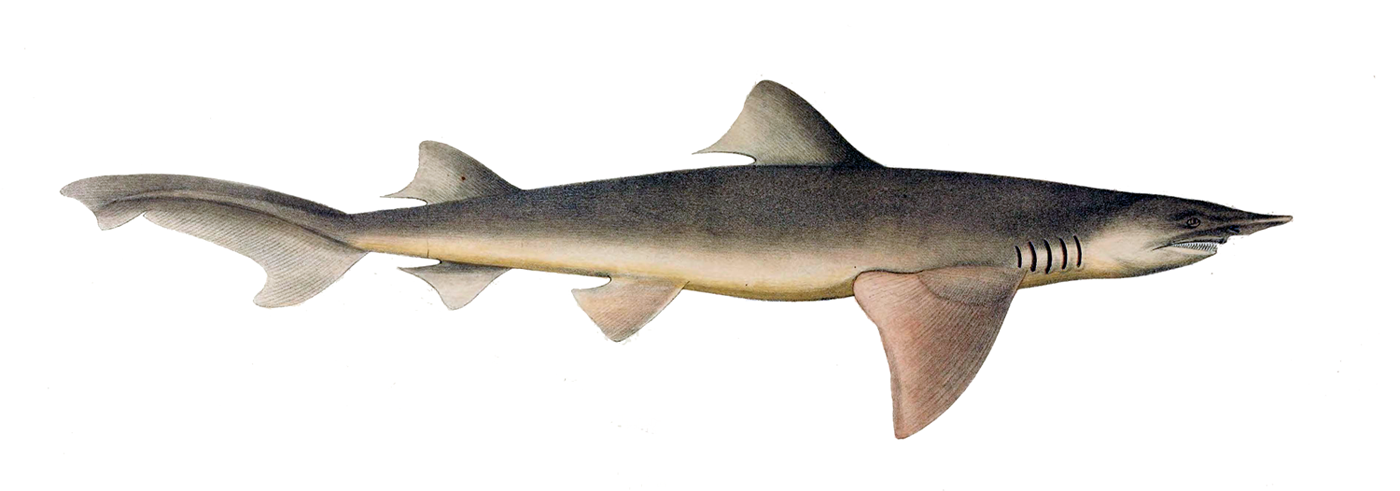
- Carcharias temminckii

Conservation status
- Endangered (IUCN 3.1)

Scientific classification
- Kingdom: Animalia
- Phylum: Chordata
- Class: Chondrichthyes
- Subclass: Elasmobranchii
- Division: Selachii
- Order: Carcharhiniformes
- Family: Carcharhinidae
- Genus: Lamiopsis
- Species: L. temminckii

Binomial name
- Lamiopsis temminckii (J. P. Müller & Henle, 1839)
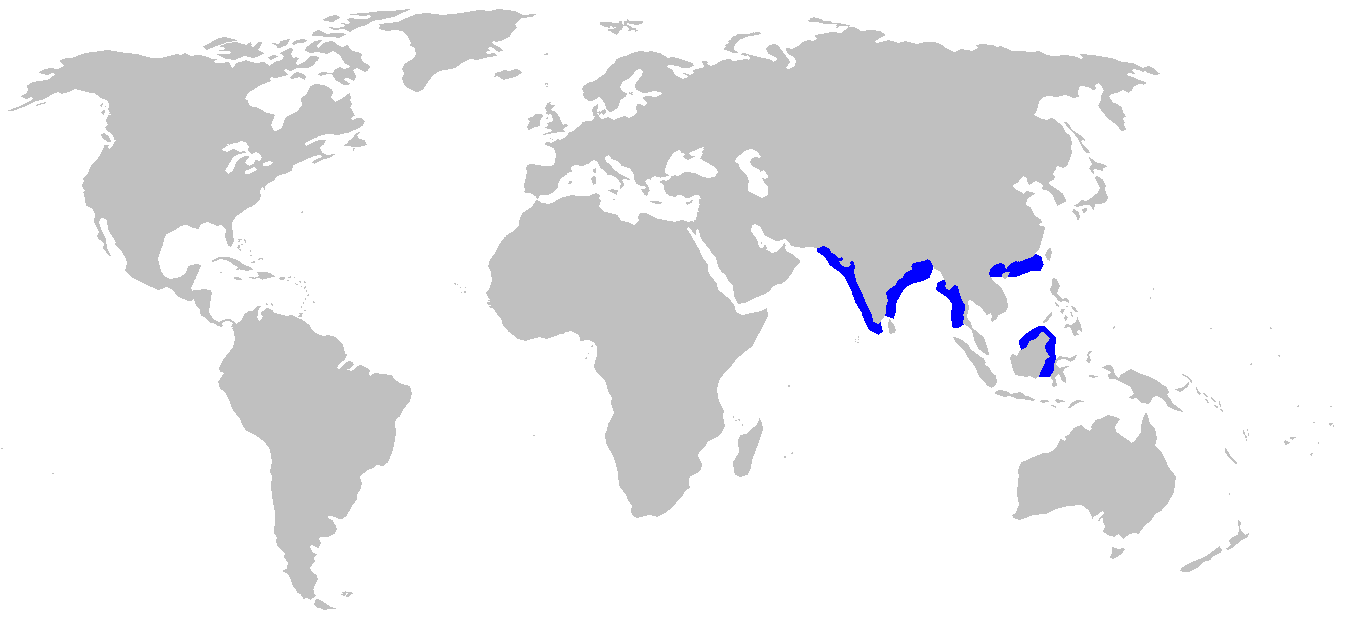
- Range of the broadfin shark

Synonyms
- Carcharhinus microphthalmus Carcharhinus temmincki Carcharias temminckii Carcharinus temminckii Carcharias (Prionodon) temminckii Carcharinus temminckii Eulamia temmincki Eulamia temminckii Lamiopsis temmincki Squalus (Carcharinus) temminckii

= Broadfin shark =

Species of shark

The broadfin shark (Lamiopsis temminckii) is a tropical whaler shark, characterized by the broad shape of its pectoral fins. They are classified as requiem sharks of the family Carcharhinidae. This is one of two species in the genus Lamiopsis, the other being the Borneo broadfin shark (Lamiopsis tephrodes). The broadfin shark is native to the northern Indian Ocean, and is found close to shore. Its current status according to the IUCN is endangered.

== Etymology ==
The shark is named in honor of Coenraad Jacob Temminck, the director of the Rijksmuseum van Natuurlijke Historie in Leiden, Netherlands.

== Description ==
Females and males of the broadfin shark species are sexually dimorphic. Females, on average, are larger than males, and it is reported that males mature at a smaller size than females. The reported size of females has decreased when compared with previous recordings of the species, with the new maximum size of females being around 175 cm (69 in), while the reported size of males has increased. Another way to tell males and females apart is by looking at the end of their pelvic fins, as males possess calcified claspers (external appendage that aid in reproduction) on the ends of their pelvic fins.

== Distribution and habitat ==
The broadfin shark is found in both the Indian Ocean and the Pacific Ocean. Its distribution is sporadic, with sightings occurring off the coasts of Pakistan, India, Indonesia, Burma, China, and Sarawak. The species tends to spend most of its time in coastal waters, not far off the coast and within the continental shelf. Females and males are evenly distributed throughout their habitat range.

== Biology ==
=== Reproduction ===
Lamiopsis temminckii is a placental viviparous species. This means that young have an umbilical scar left over at birth. Females of this species average two to four embryos per uterus at a time, and the typical amount of embryos total in a litter averages to be around eight at a time. Late term embryos are common in the summer (April–August), and births are estimated to occur most often during the pre southwest monsoon season and southwest monsoon season from March to September. At birth, the broadfin shark ranges in size from 41.8–65.0 cm (16.5–25.6 in). The shark has a low productivity rate, and therefore, a limited rebound potential.

=== Feeding ===
The broadfin shark primarily feeds on crustaceans, teleosts, and cephalopods. Analysis of the stomach contents of 214 individuals revealed that crustaceans are their most abundant prey. The broadfin shark is a top predator in its coastal habitats; however, it has been documented that the shark is parasitized by Sanguilevator yearsleyi, a blood sequestering tapeworm.

== Anthropogenic influences and conservation ==
The broadfin shark is known to be endangered globally. However, this may need to be reassessed as it was last assessed before the identification of the Borneo broadfin shark (Lamiopsis tephrodes). It is likely that misidentifying Borneo broadfin sharks as broadfin sharks could have skewed the population numbers. Therefore, it is possible that the actual status of the broadfin shark population has been recorded as healthier than it truly is, and they may belong in the critically endangered list. This is still to be determined.

While, there have always low population numbers, at one time the species was considered to be common in heavily fished areas like Indonesia, the Arabian Sea, and the western coast of India. This is thought to be part of the reason that the shark's population is now on the decline, as one main reason for its endangerment status is that it is often by-catch in sailors’ nets. Juveniles are unproportionately caught in the late summer months, as their birthing season lines up with the seasonal closure of mechanized fishing throughout their habitat. This issue is especially common within the Arabian Sea and along the coast of India. Since the shark frequents inshore areas, especially those that have an abundance of fish, they are at risk of getting caught in bottom nets, floating gill nets, and fishing line. Little effort has been made to remediate this issue. Another reason for the declining population of the broadfin shark is the culture surrounding shark fin soup, which is thought to be a delicacy in many Asian countries. Sharks are also fished for their meat and their liver, which is used for vitamin oil. However new policies are being developed to prevent this from happening further.
