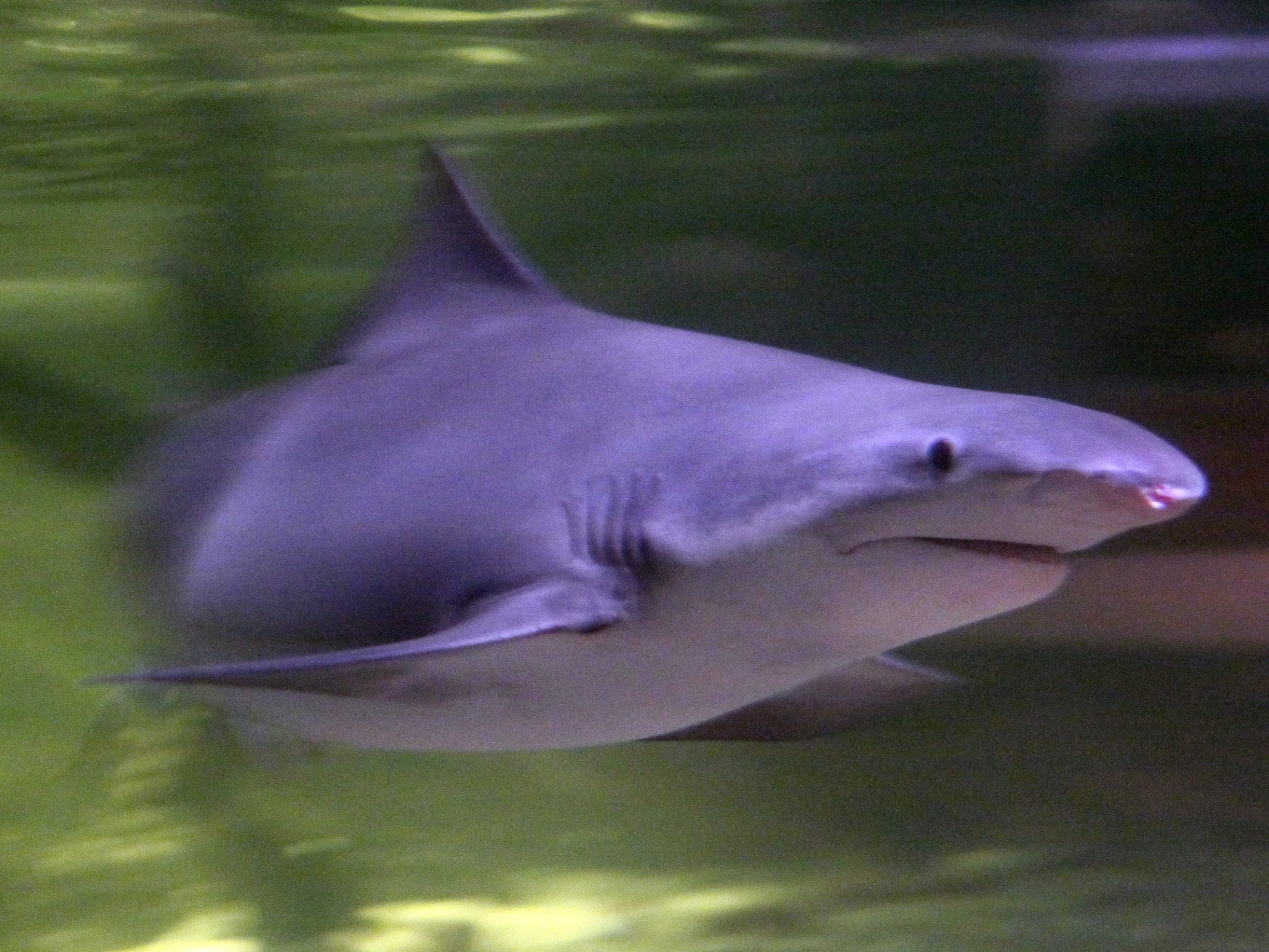
- Speartooth shark (Glyphis glyphis) at the Melbourne Aquarium

Scientific classification
- Kingdom: Animalia
- Phylum: Chordata
- Class: Chondrichthyes
- Subclass: Elasmobranchii
- Division: Selachii
- Order: Carcharhiniformes
- Family: Carcharhinidae
- Genus: Glyphis; Agassiz, 1843

Type species
- Carcharias (Prionodon) glyphis Müller & Henle, 1839

= River shark =

River shark Temporal range: Middle Miocene – recent

Genus of sharks

Glyphis is a genus in the family Carcharhinidae, commonly known as the river sharks. They live in rivers or coastal regions in and around southeast Asia, and parts of Australia.

While the bull shark (Carcharhinus leucas) is also called "river shark" and "Ganges shark", it should not be confused with the river sharks of the genus Glyphis; they are often sympatric, living within the same river systems.

== Taxonomy ==
The number of Glyphis species may be higher than is currently accepted, though research is hampered by the secretive habits of these sharks. This genus was thought to contain five different species, but molecular studies revealed that Glyphis gangeticus has an irregular distribution in the Indo-West Pacific region, and that the Bornean and Irrawaddy River sharks fall within the variation of Glyphis gangeticus. Some authorities continue to separate these species.

The genus Glyphis is closest to the Lamiopsis.

The recognized species in this genus are:

- Glyphis gangeticus (J. P. Müller & Henle, 1839) (Ganges shark)
- Glyphis garricki L. J. V. Compagno, W. T. White & Last, 2008 (northern river shark)
- Glyphis glyphis (J. P. Müller & Henle, 1839) (speartooth shark)
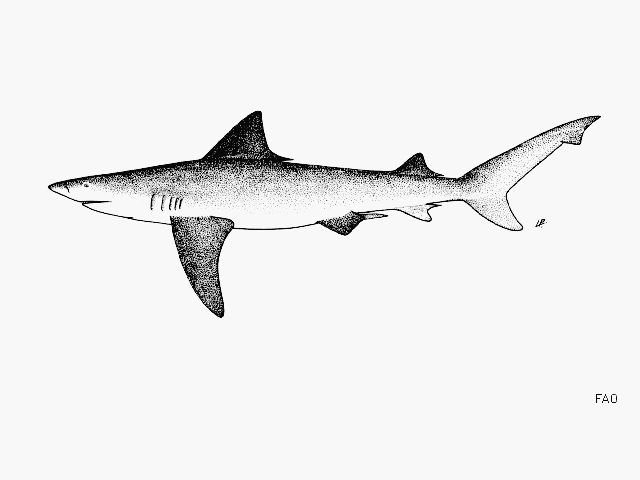
Ganges shark (G. gangeticus)

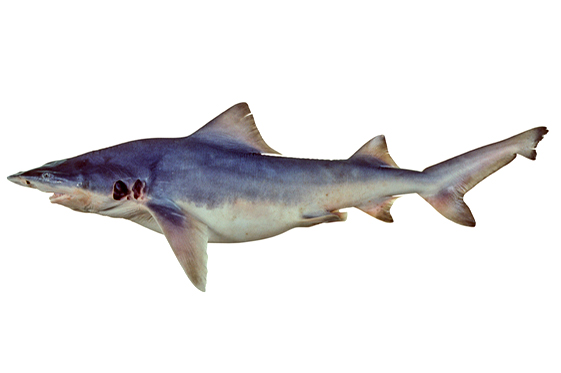
Northern river shark (G. garricki)

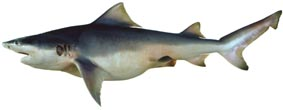
Speartooth shark (G. glyphis)

The only known prehistoric species is †Glyphis pagoda (Noetling, 1901) from the middle and late Miocene of Myanmar. †Glyphis hastalis was initially described by Agassiz (1843) from the Early Eocene-aged London Clay of England, and is technically the type species of the genus, but its classification within Glyphis is now thought to be erroneous. In addition, fossil teeth of an indeterminate Glyphis, potentially either the modern G. glyphis or G. garricki, are known from the Late Miocene of Brunei.

== Distribution and habitat ==
Their precise geographic range is uncertain, but the known species are documented in parts of South Asia, Southeast Asia, New Guinea, and Australia. Of the accepted species, the Ganges shark is restricted to freshwater, while the northern river shark and the speartooth shark are also found in coastal marine waters. They have been found in nine different tidal areas, which consist of muddy waters with a low salinity. Their placement in connection to coastal marine waters indicates that they are usually born around October.

== Conservation ==
River sharks remain very poorly known to researchers; they were thought to be extinct until the end of the 20th century, when small populations were discovered in Borneo and Northern Australia.

Glyphis gangeticus uses the Ganges River as nursery grounds and the birthplace of many Ganges shark offspring, however the population has been severely diminished owing to a long history of fishing and other pollution-related issues in the Northern Arabian Sea. Additionally, India, where the Ganges river flows, is reported to be one of the top three greatest shark and ray capturers in the world, accounting for up to nine percent of reported global landings (Jabado et al., 2018).
