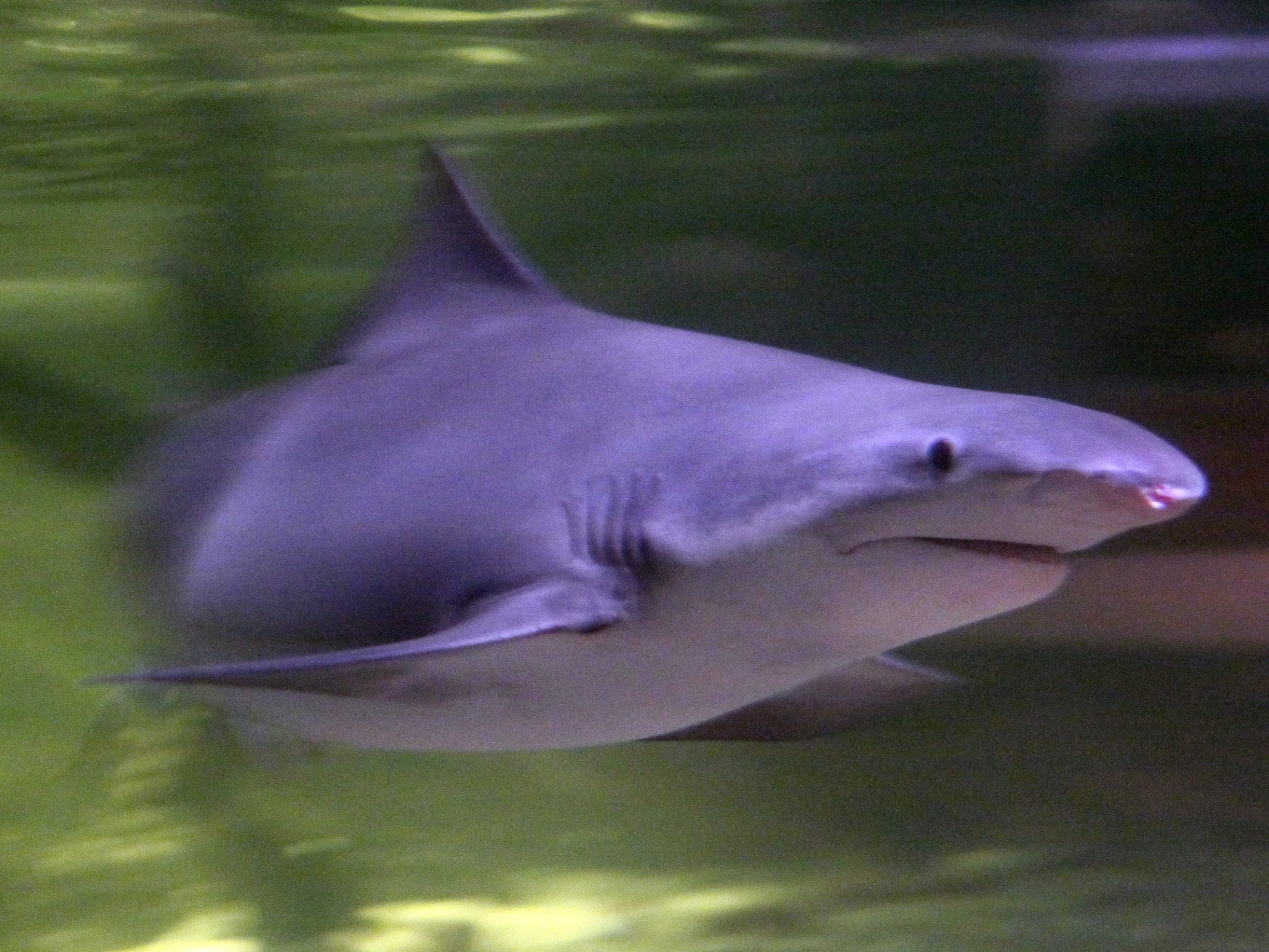

Conservation status
- Vulnerable (IUCN 3.1)

Scientific classification
- Kingdom: Animalia
- Phylum: Chordata
- Class: Chondrichthyes
- Subclass: Elasmobranchii
- Division: Selachii
- Order: Carcharhiniformes
- Family: Carcharhinidae
- Genus: Glyphis
- Species: G. glyphis

Binomial name
- Glyphis glyphis (J. P. Müller & Henle, 1839)
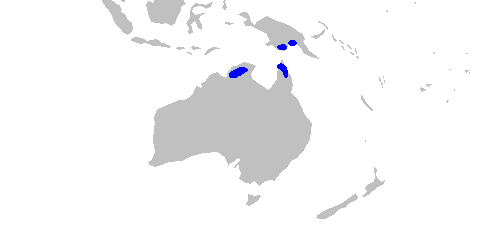
- Range of the speartooth shark

= Speartooth shark =

Speartooth shark Temporal range: Early Miocene to present

Species of shark

The speartooth shark (Glyphis glyphis) is a rare species of river shark, belonging to the family Carcharhinidae. It inhabits coastal marine waters and tidal reaches of large tropical rivers in northern Australia and New Guinea. Despite being a member of the river shark genus, it is also found in near-shore marine waters, favoring highly turbid environments over a wide range of salinities. This robustly built, gray-colored shark is characterized by a short and broad snout, tiny eyes, a relatively large second dorsal fin, and a black blotch beneath each pectoral fin near the tip. Another identifying trait is its teeth, which are large, triangular, and serrated in the upper jaw and narrow, spear-like, and serrated only near the tips in the lower jaw. Adults grow to about 2.6 m (8.5 ft) long.

Preying on demersal bony fishes and crustaceans, the speartooth shark is adapted for hunting in near-complete darkness. It is not as active as other requiem sharks, moving upstream and downstream with tidal currents so as to save energy. Reproduction is viviparous, with females forming a placental connection to their young, though details are unknown. The speartooth shark is threatened by incidental capture in commercial and recreational fisheries, as well as by habitat degradation. Given its small population, restricted range, and stringent habitat requirements, this species is highly susceptible to these pressures and has been listed as vulnerable by the International Union for Conservation of Nature.

== Taxonomy ==
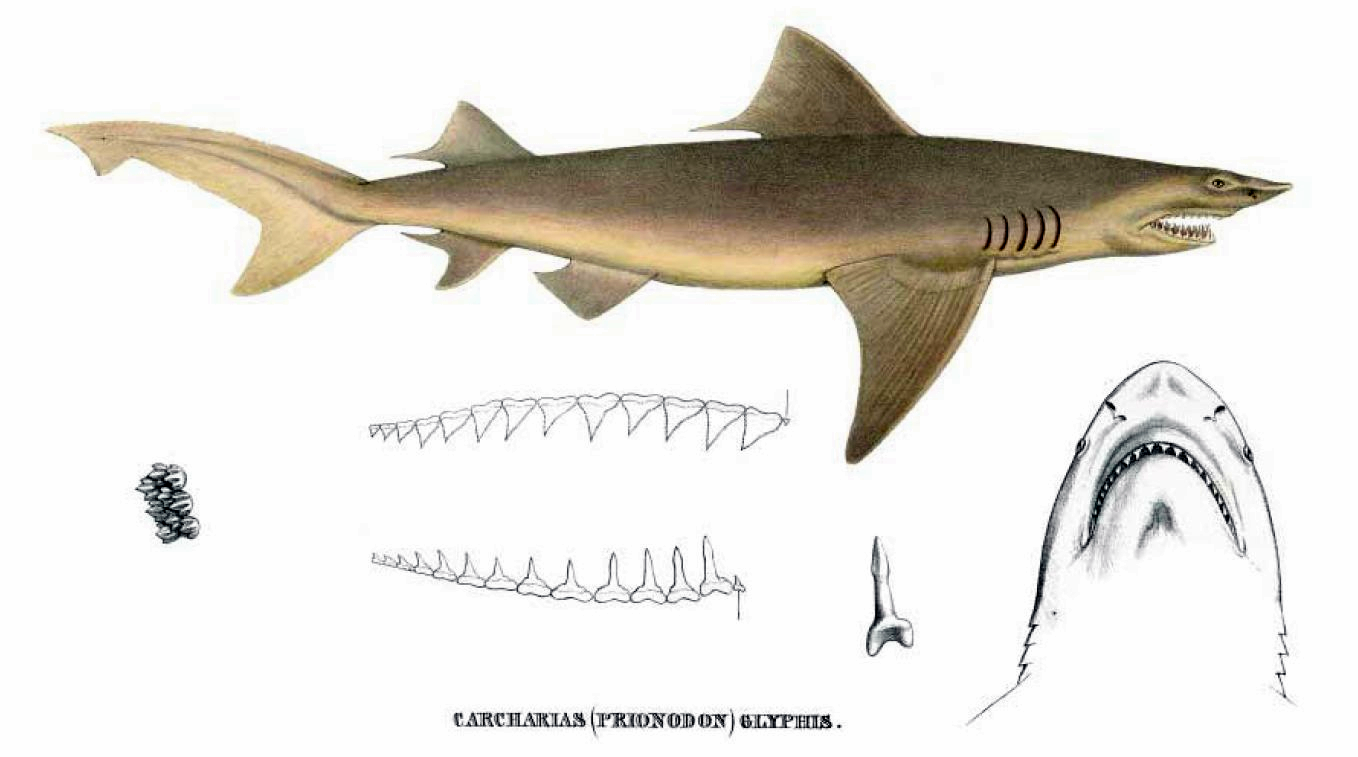
Müller and Henle's original illustration of Carcharias (Prionodon) glyphis

German biologists Johannes Müller and Jakob Henle originally described the speartooth shark as Carcharias (Prionodon) glyphis, in their 1839–41 Systematische Beschreibung der Plagiostomen. They based their account on a stuffed juvenile female 1 m (3.3 ft) long, of unknown origin (possibly the Indian Ocean or the South China Sea). In 1843, Swiss-American zoologist Louis Agassiz proposed the new genus Glyphis for this species and a fossil relative from Britain, G. hastalis. However, the use of Glyphis to encompass the river sharks did not gain wide acceptance until Jack Garrick's 1982 revision of Carcharhinus.

Müller and Henle's type specimen remained the sole known record of the speartooth shark until specimens of the "Bizant river shark" (Glyphis sp. A) were caught in Australia in 1982. Subsequently, work by Leonard Compagno, William White, and Peter Last confirmed initial suspicions that "sp. A" was the same species as G. glyphis. Thus, in Australia, this shark may also be referred to as the Bizant river shark or the Queensland river shark.

Fossil teeth suggest that the speartooth shark once had a much larger range, with fossils being known from the Early Miocene to Pliocene of Portugal and the Pliocene of Italy. Potential records of this species are also known from the Late Miocene of Brunei.

== Distribution and habitat ==
Juvenile and subadult speartooth sharks are found in a few large, mangrove-lined tropical rivers in northern Australia and New Guinea, from the estuary to hundreds of kilometers upstream; a single possible record from the South China Sea exists. In Queensland, it occurs in the Wenlock, Ducie, and Bizant Rivers, and perhaps also the Normanby, Hey, and Embly Rivers. In the Northern Territory, it is known from the Adelaide River and the Alligator Rivers. The river sharks in the Ord River of Western Australia may also be of this species. In New Guinea, this species has been reported from Daru island, near Port Romilly and in the Fly River.

Newborn to subadult speartooth sharks exclusively inhabit areas with fast tidal currents and muddy bottoms; the flowing water produces heavy turbidity, such as that <1% of sunlight penetrates beyond a depth of 1 m (3.3 ft). The salinity level of these waters range from nearly fresh (0.8 ppt) to nearly marine (28 ppt), and temperatures range from 25 to 33 °C (77 to 91 °F). Younger sharks are generally found further upstream than older ones. A study that tracked three individuals in the Adelaide River reported that they moved upstream with the flooding tide and downstream with the ebbing tide, averaging 10–12 km (6.2–7.5 mi) each way. The average swimming depth was determined for one individual to be 7.7 m (25 ft), in the middle of the water column. Adults were entirely unknown until 2014, when three specimens (two males and one female) were documented by scientists visiting fishing villages on Daru island, Papua New Guinea. All three were caught in coastal waters off the island. No evidence exists of segregation by sex.

Recently in 2024 a new population were found in the Roper River of the Northern Territory, the first time ever documented living in that area, there was enough living specimens for a viable population and keeping the species alive.

== Description ==
Without any known adult specimens, the maximum size of this species has historically been labelled with considerable uncertainty. In 2014, the first known adults were documented and on this basis it reaches a length around 2.6 m (8.5 ft). The speartooth shark has a streamlined, rather robust body with a short, wide head. The snout is flattened, with large nostrils divided into incurrent and excurrent openings by large, triangular flaps of skin. The eyes are small and equipped with nictitating membranes (protective third eyelids). The sizable, arched mouth has very short furrows at the corners. It has 26–29 upper and 27–29 lower tooth rows. The teeth are tall and upright; those in the upper jaw are wide and triangular with serrated edges, while those in the lower jaw are narrow and spear-like with serrations only near the tip, and tiny cusplets at the base in very young individuals. There are five pairs of gill slits, with the first pair longer than the others.

The large pectoral fins have strongly convex leading and concave trailing margins, and blunt tips. The pelvic fins are triangular with nearly straight margins. The first dorsal fin originates over the pectoral fin insertions, and is broadly triangular with a narrow apex and a concave trailing margin. The second dorsal fin measures about 67–77% as tall as the first and is similar in shape; there is no midline ridge between the dorsal fins. The anal fin is almost as large as the second dorsal fin and lies slightly behind; it has a deep notch in the posterior margin. The caudal fin is asymmetrical; the lower lobe is narrow and well-developed, while the upper lobe has a gently convex upper margin and a prominent notch in the ventral margin near the tip. The body is covered by small, overlapping oval-shaped dermal denticles bearing three or five horizontal ridges leading to marginal teeth. This species is plain slate-gray above, including the upper surfaces of the pectoral and pelvic fins, and the caudal fin; the underside is white. The boundary between dark and light runs through the bottom rim of the eye, through the gill slits, over the flank well above the pelvic fins, and onto the upper caudal fin lobe. The fins darken towards the posterior margins, forming a black edge on the upper caudal fin lobe; each pectoral fin also has a black blotch underneath, near the tip. The eyes are ringed in white.

== Biology and ecology ==
The speartooth shark seems to be relatively sluggish in nature, moving with the tides so as to conserve energy. Its activity levels are unaffected by day or night, reflecting the constant darkness of its environment. Small eyes and abundant ampullae of Lorenzini suggest that this shark relies more on electroreception than sight to hunt, while the large second dorsal fin enhances its ability to maneuver at slow speeds in fast currents. It has slender teeth adept for catching bony fishes and crustaceans, mostly on or near the bottom. Known prey of juveniles include Macrobrachium prawns, Taenoides or Trypauchen burrowing gobies, ariid catfish, the threadfin Polydactylus macrochir, the gudgeon Prionobutis microps, the benthic croaker Nibea squamosa and the bream Nematalosa erebi. Very little is known about the feeding habits of adults, but many bony fish spines and a stingray spine were found embedded in the jaws of the only documented adult female. As in other requiem sharks, the speartooth shark is viviparous: when the developing embryo exhausts its supply of yolk, the yolk sac develops into a placental connection through which the mother delivers nourishment. Birthing seems to occur from October to December, near the end of the dry season, with newborns measuring around 50–59 cm (20–23 in) long. Upon being captured a female gave birth to a single fully developed pup, about 65 cm (2.13 ft) long, and anecdotal information indicates a litter size of six to seven. The growth rate of young sharks is probably around 19 cm (7.5 in) per year.

== Human interactions ==
The speartooth shark is not known to pose a danger to humans. Extremely rare like other river sharks, its global population has been estimated to number no more than 2,500 mature individuals, with no more than 250 in any subpopulation. This species is caught incidentally by commercial fisheries using gillnets and longlines, such as the barramundi (Lates calcarifer) gillnet fishery in Queensland (barramundi fisheries in New South Wales have been prohibited from rivers occupied by this species since 2005). Significant numbers are also taken by recreational anglers and bow fishers. Captured sharks might be eaten, used to bait crab pots, or discarded on land. Habitat degradation represents a third threat to the speartooth shark: the Fly River in Papua New Guinea has been severely affected by pollutants from mining activities, while proposed mining and dredging projects in the Port Musgrave area and uranium mining in Kakadu National Park are also of concern.

The range of conservation threats faced by the speartooth shark, coupled with its small population and restricted range and habitat preferences, have led the International Union for Conservation of Nature to assess it as vulnerable. Furthermore, in Australia, it has been listed as critically endangered on the 1999 Commonwealth Environment Protection and Biodiversity Conservation Act. The speartooth shark is within the scope of the Sawfish and river shark multispecies recovery plan made under the EPBC Act. It has also been listed as vulnerable on the 2000 Territory Parks and Wildlife Conservation Act, though a management plan has yet to be enacted. Sharks in the Kakadu and Rinyirru National Parks are protected somewhat from habitat alteration, if not fishing. No regulations restrict the capture of this species in Papua New Guinea.
