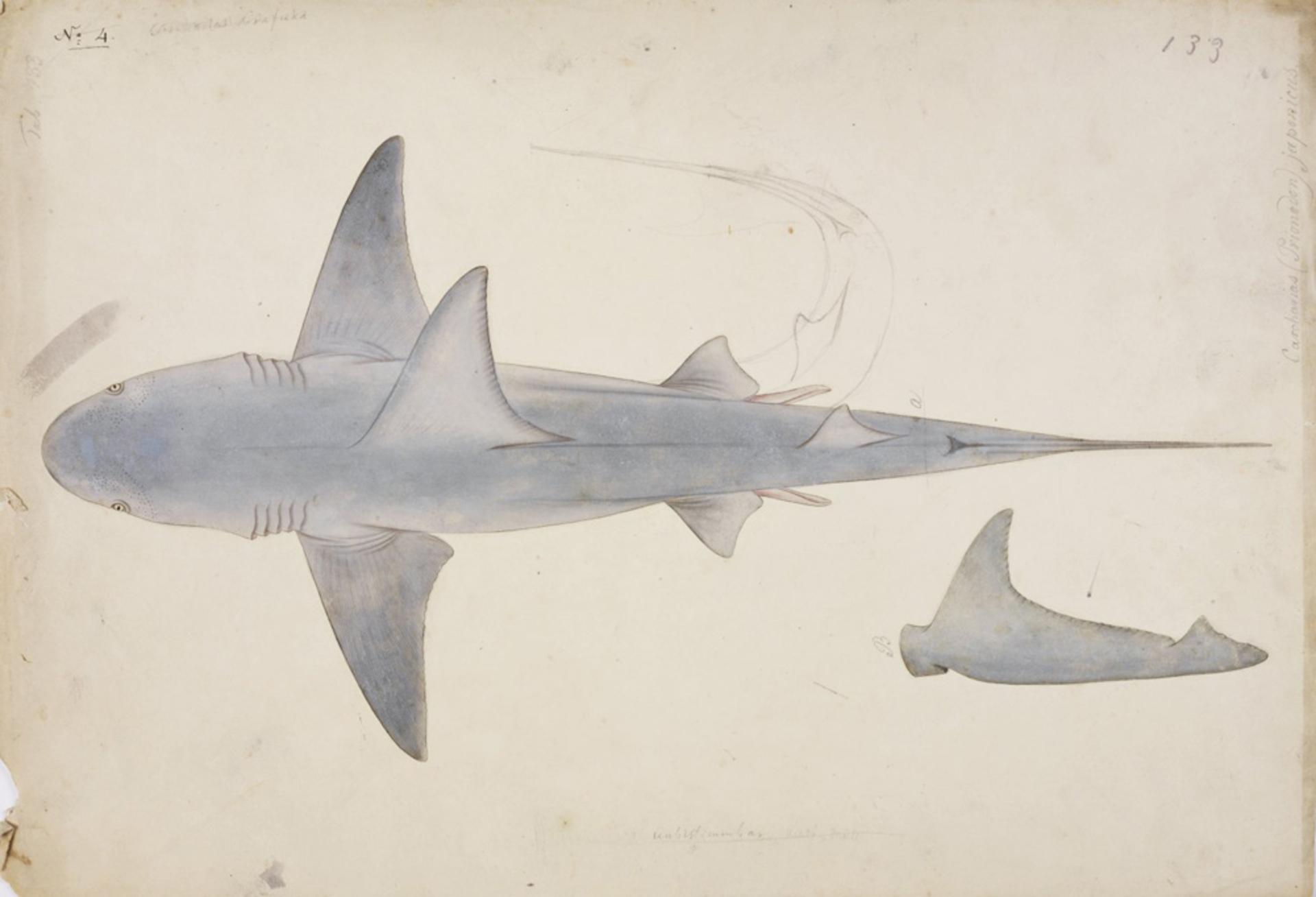

Conservation status
- Critically Endangered (IUCN 3.1)

Scientific classification
- Kingdom: Animalia
- Phylum: Chordata
- Class: Chondrichthyes
- Subclass: Elasmobranchii
- Division: Selachii
- Order: Carcharhiniformes
- Family: Carcharhinidae
- Genus: Glyphis
- Species: G. gangeticus

Binomial name
- Glyphis gangeticus (J. P. Müller & Henle, 1839)
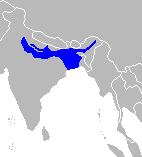
- Glyphis gangeticus inhabits the Ganges-Hooghly River system

Synonyms
- Carcharhinus gangeticus (Müller & Henle, 1839); Carcharias gangeticus (Müller & Henle, 1839); Carcharias murrayi (Günther, 1883); Eulamia gangetica (Müller & Henle, 1839); Platypodon gangeticus (Müller & Henle, 1839); Carcharias siamensis (Steindachner, 1896); Glyphis siamensis (Steindachner, 1896); Glyphis fowlerae (Compagno, W. T. White & Cavanagh, 2010)

= Ganges shark =

Ganges shark Temporal range: Miocene-recent

Species of shark

The Ganges shark (Glyphis gangeticus) is a critically endangered species of requiem shark found in the Ganges River (including the Padma River) and the Brahmaputra River of India and Bangladesh. Additionally, genetic evidence has shown that both the Borneo river shark (G. fowlerae) and Irrawaddy river shark (G. siamensis) should be regarded as synonyms of the Ganges shark, expanding the range of the species to Pakistan, Myanmar, Borneo, and Java. The species remains poorly known and is very rare throughout its range.

Glyphis are often confused with the more common bull shark (Carcharhinus leucas), which also inhabits the Ganges River and is sometimes incorrectly referred to as the Ganges shark.

== Taxonomy ==
Formerly, the Borneo river shark (Glyphis fowlerae) and the Irrawaddy river shark (Glyphis siamensis) were considered to represent two other species in the genus Glyphis. They have recently been reclassified as G. gangeticus based on genetic studies, and their scientific names are treated as synonyms.

The Borneo river shark is known only from the Kinabatangan River in Borneo. It can reach a length of 78 cm (31 in). Only 13 specimens are known to science, all collected in 1996. Expeditions in 2010 and 2011 failed to find any, and while fishermen recognised the shark, they have not been seen for many years.

The Irrawaddy river shark is known only from a single museum specimen originally caught at the mouth of the Irrawaddy River in Myanmar, a brackish-water locality in a large, heavily silt-laden river lined with mangrove forests. It was collected in the 19th century and described as Carcharias siamensis by Austrian ichthyologist Franz Steindachner, in Annalen des Naturhistorischen Museums in Wien (volume 11, 1896). However, subsequent authors doubted the validity of this species, regarding it as an abnormal bull shark (Carcharhinus leucas), until in 2005 shark systematist Leonard Compagno recognized it as distinct member of the genus Glyphis. The specimen is a 60-cm-long immature male. It closely resembles the Ganges shark, but has more vertebrae (209 versus 169) and fewer teeth (29/29 versus 32–37/31–34).

A possibly undescribed species of Glyphis is known from Mukah in Borneo, as well as Bangladesh. The status of a Borneo specimen from Sampit remains unclear.

== Physical appearance ==
G. gangeticus is a little-known species that is yet to be adequately described. Its size at birth is 56 to 61 cm (22 to 24 in), growing to an estimated 178 cm (70 in) at maturity, with a maximum size of about 204 cm (80 in). The size at birth or maturity is unknown for any other Glyphis species.

A typical requiem shark in its external appearance, it is stocky, with two spineless dorsal fins and an anal fin. The first dorsal fin originates over the last third of the pectoral fins, with a free rear tip that is well in front of the pelvic fins. The second dorsal fin is relatively large, but much smaller than the first (about half the height). The anal fin is slightly smaller than the second dorsal fin and the pectoral fins are broad. A longitudinal upper precaudal pit is seen, but no interdorsal ridge. It is uniformly grey to brownish in color, with no discernible markings.

Its snout is broadly rounded and much shorter than the width of its mouth. The mouth is long, broad, and extends back and up towards the eyes.

Its eyes are minute, suggesting that it may be adapted to turbid water with poor visibility, such as occurs in the Ganges River and the Bay of Bengal. It has internal nictitating eyelids.

The upper teeth have high, broad, serrated, triangular cusps and the labial furrows are very short. The lower front teeth have long, hooked, protruding cusps with unserrated cutting edges along the entire cusp, but without spear-like tips and with low cusplets on feet of crowns. The tooth row counts are 32–37/31–34.

=== Diagnostic features ===
G. gangeticus can be identified by the first few lower front teeth, which have cutting edges along entire cusp, giving the cusps a claw-like shape, and low cusplets. Also, a second dorsal fin that is about half the height of first dorsal is distinct to this species.

== Distribution ==
The Ganges shark, as its name suggests, is largely restricted to the rivers of eastern and northeastern India, particularly the Hooghly River of West Bengal, and the Ganges, Brahmaputra, and Mahanadi in Bihar, Assam, and Odisha, respectively. It is typically found in the middle to lower reaches of a river. One found in 2018 in a Mumbai fish market may have come from somewhere along the banks of the Arabian Sea.

In theory, G. gangeticus could occur in shallow marine estuaries; however, no marine records of the species have been verified to date. Originally, the species was assigned a wide range in the Indo-West Pacific, but this was found to be mostly based on other species of requiem sharks, particularly members of the genus Carcharhinus.

Most literature records and specimens labelled as this species are in fact bull sharks (Carcharhinus leucas) or other carcharhinid species. An extensive 10-year search produced only a few specimens, caught in 1996 in the Ganges River.

== Habitat and ecology ==
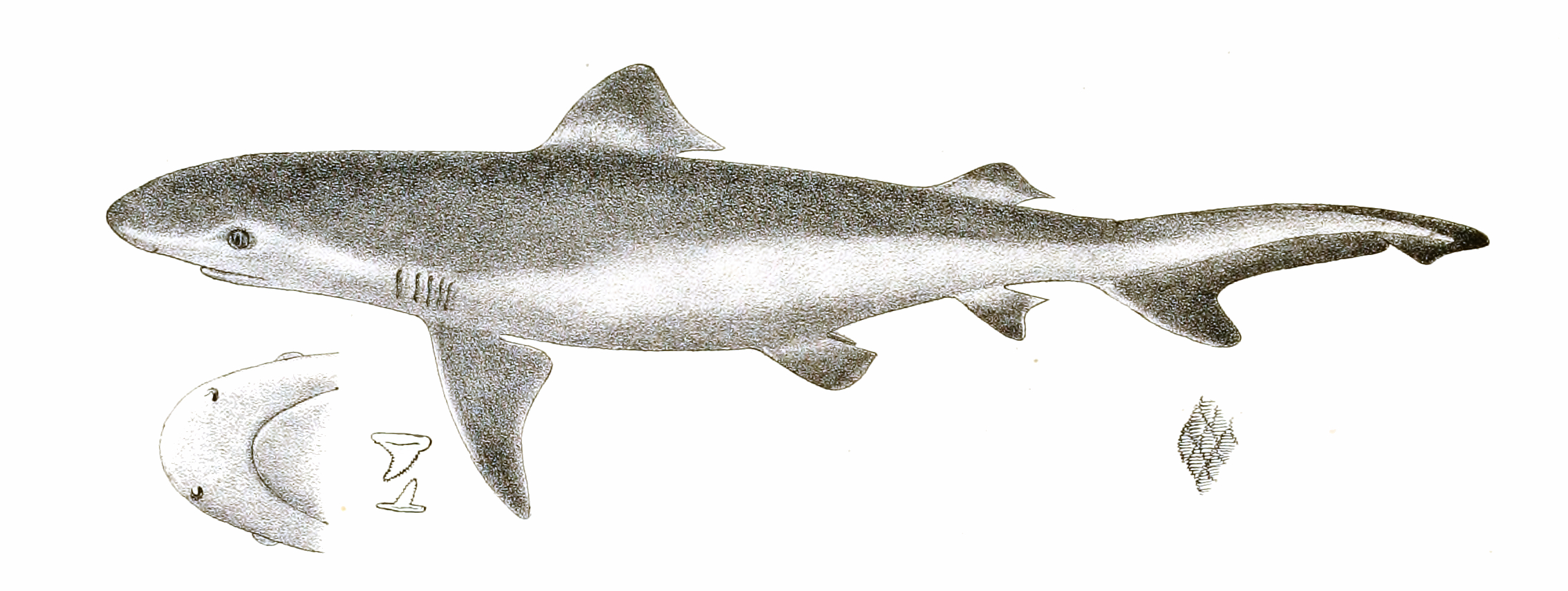

G. gangeticus is known to inhabit only freshwater, inshore marine, and estuarine systems in the lower reaches of the Ganges-Hooghly River system. Their feeding habits are mostly unknown. The shark's small eyes and slender teeth suggest that it is primarily a fish-eater and is adapted to turbid water. With such limited visibility typical of many tropical rivers and estuaries, other senses − such as hearing, smell, and electroreception − are likely used for predation. Because its eyes are tilted towards its back rather than to the sides or bottom (as is the case in most carcharhinids), the shark may swim along the bottom and scan the water above it for potential prey back-lit by the sun. However, in the Bay of Bengal, G. gangeticus was found to feed heavily on dasyatid stingrays, which spend much of their time on the bottom.

=== Reproduction ===
It is probably viviparous, with a yolk-sac placenta (speculation through analogy to related species of carcharhinids). The litter size and gestation period are unknown. However, their life history cycle is probably similar to other river sharks, characterized by long gestation, slow growth, delayed maturity, and small litter size. These factors make the Ganges shark populations vulnerable to even relatively low levels of exploitation, such as sport angling or gill netting.

=== Possibility of migration ===
Some researchers consider G. gangeticus to be amphidromous, covering more than 100 km (62 mi) in both directions. However, this is not thought to be for breeding, as the case in anadromous and catadromous species. The presence of newborn individuals in the Hooghly River suggests that the young may be born in fresh water.

A specimen photographed in 2011 by natural history journalist Malaka Rodrigo at Negombo fish market in Sri Lanka prompted researcher Rex de Silva to speculate on whether the species could occasionally be carried south of its normal range by ocean currents. However, only the head of the shark appears in the photo. Leading shark expert Leonard Compagno emphasised the need to check the dentition and the dorsal fin proportions to confirm the specimen as G. gangeticus, stating that it could also be one of the four other named species.

=== Specimens ===
G. gangeticus was originally known only from three 19th-century museum specimens, one each in the National Museum of Natural History in Paris, Natural History Museum, Berlin in Berlin, and the Zoological Survey of India in Calcutta. No records exist between 1867 and 1996, and the 1996 records have not been confirmed as G. gangeticus. A specimen collected 84 km (52 mi) upstream of the mouth of the Hooghly River at Mahishadal in 2001 was identified as G. gangeticus, but on photographs of the jaw only. If Carcharias murrayi (Günter, 1887) can be considered a junior synonym of this species, one was found near Karachi, Pakistan. However, the holotype was apparently lost or misplaced in the British Museum of Natural History.

One female specimen was recorded at Sassoon Docks in Mumbai, India, in February 2016, measuring 266 cm (105 in) total length. It was caught in the Arabian Sea.

=== Molecular biology ===
Glyphis species, like other sharks, exhibit a very slow rate of genetic change. This makes them even more vulnerable to becoming extinct, as they are unable to adapt to the rapid and extreme changes caused by humans to their environment.

As only a few specimens exist, naturally little material available is for genetic sampling. However, two websites list records for G. gangeticus:

The Barcode of Life Data Systems (BOLDS) Stats website lists one record:
Public Records: 0
Specimens with Barcodes: 1
Species With Barcodes: 1

The NCBI Taxonomy database has one record of mitochondrial genetic material (1,044 base pairs of linear DNA):
Glyphis gangeticus bio-material GN2669, reported in a 2012 paper on DNA sequencing in shark and ray species.

== Conservation ==
G. gangeticus is one of 20 sharks on the International Union for Conservation of Nature and Natural Resources Red List of endangered shark species. The species is currently classified as critically endangered. According to the organisation, fewer than 250 Ganges sharks are believed to exist. The need is urgent for a detailed survey of the shark fisheries of the Bay of Bengal.

=== Major threats ===
River sharks are thought to be particularly vulnerable to habitat changes. The Ganges shark is restricted to a very narrow band of habitat that is heavily affected by human activity. Overfishing, habitat degradation from pollution, increasing river use, and management including the construction of dams and barrages, are the principal threats. Thought to be consumed locally for its meat, the Ganges shark is caught by gillnet, and its oil, along with that of the South Asian river dolphin, is highly sought after as a fish attractant. It is also believed to be part of the Asian shark fin trade. After a sighting in 2006, the species was not seen again for over a decade until one was found at a Mumbai fish market in 2016.

The single Irrawaddy river shark specimen stems from an area of intensive artisanal fishing, mainly gillnetting, but also line and electrofishing. Habitat degradation may pose a further threat to this shark, including water pollution and the clearing of mangrove trees for fuel, construction materials, and other products. The shark may be naturally rare in this area and highly restricted in its range. Despite fishing and scientific surveys in the area, no more Irrawaddy river sharks have been recorded in the 100-plus years since the first.

=== Conservation actions ===
In 2001, the Indian government banned the landing of all species of chondrichthyan fish in its ports. However, shortly afterwards, this ban was amended to cover only 10 species of chondrichthyans. These, including G. gangeticus, are protected under Schedule I, Part II A of the Wildlife Protection Act of India. Doubt exists about the effectiveness of this measure, however, because of difficulties in enforcement. A widespread, albeit widely dispersed, artisanal fishery exists for both local consumption and international trade. Compagno (1997) recommends an in-depth survey of fishing camps and landing sites, along with a sampling program in the Ganges system to determine the current status of this shark along with other Gangetic elasmobranchs such as stingrays and sawfish.

== Human interaction ==
The Ganges shark is widely feared as a ferocious man-eater, but most of the attacks attributed to it are probably the result of confusion with the bull shark Carcharhinus leucas. This is likely because bull sharks are known to travel long distances into freshwater systems and may co-exist in the same waters as the Ganges shark. Since little is known about the behaviour of genuine freshwater river sharks, and since G. gangeticus is critically endangered, contact with humans is very rare. There has been one attack which might be attributable to the Ganges shark, this attack happened in 1868 in the Hooghly River at Calcutta and was attributed to the shark by Joseph Fayrer.

The biological differences between the Ganges shark and bull shark also point to a lower likelihood of attacks on humans by the Ganges shark. G. gangeticus has much narrower, higher, upper teeth and slender-cusped, less heavily built lower teeth than C. leucas. Such small sharp teeth are more suitable for fish-impaling, and less useful for dismembering tough mammalian prey than the stout teeth of the bull shark.

== Etymology ==
Glyphis: from Greek glyphe, means "carving".

== See also ==
- List of sharks
- List of critically endangered fishes
