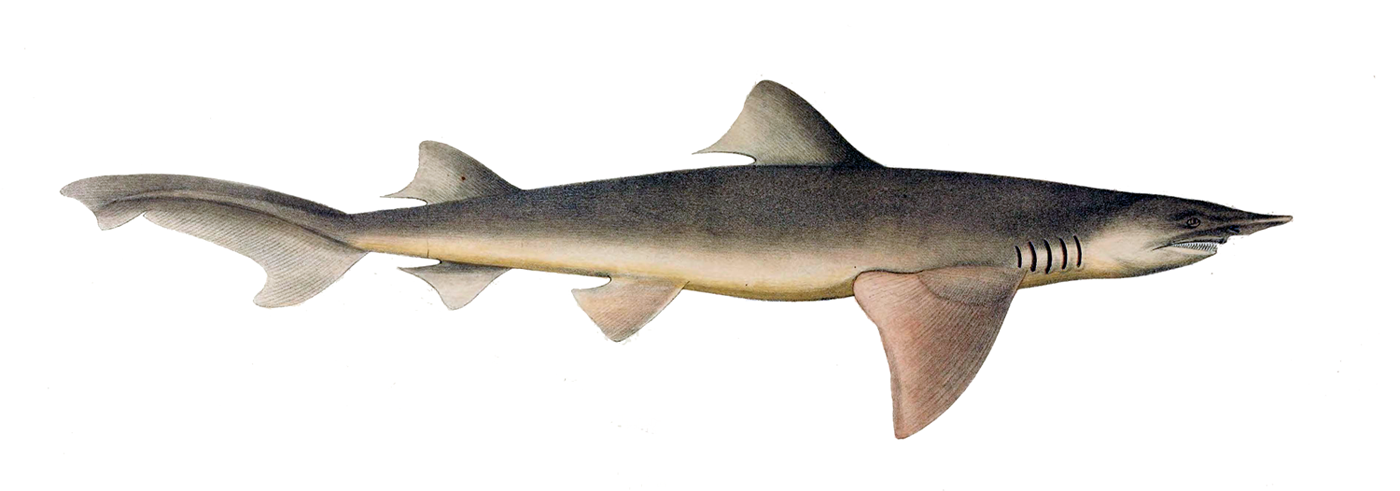
- Broadfin shark, (Lamiopsis temminckii)

Scientific classification
- Kingdom: Animalia
- Phylum: Chordata
- Class: Chondrichthyes
- Subclass: Elasmobranchii
- Division: Selachii
- Order: Carcharhiniformes
- Family: Carcharhinidae
- Genus: Lamiopsis; T. N. Gill, 1862

Type species
- Carcharias (Prionodon) temminckii Müller & Henle, 1839

= Lamiopsis =

Genus of sharks

Lamiopsis is a genus of shark in the family Carcharhinidae found in Indian and Pacific Ocean. This genus was previously considered to be monotypic. However, a recent taxonomic study revealed that the western central Pacific populations were a separate species.

== Species ==
There are currently 2 recognized species in this genus:

- Lamiopsis temminckii (J. P. Müller & Henle, 1839) (Broadfin shark)
- Lamiopsis tephrodes (Fowler, 1905) (Borneo broadfin shark)
