= Smalltooth stingray =

Conservation status
- Critically Endangered (IUCN 3.1)

Scientific classification
- Kingdom: Animalia
- Phylum: Chordata
- Class: Chondrichthyes
- Subclass: Elasmobranchii
- Order: Myliobatiformes
- Family: Dasyatidae
- Genus: Hypanus
- Species: H. rudis

Binomial name
- Hypanus rudis (Günther, 1870)

Synonyms
- Dasyatis rudis; Trygon rudis; Dasybatus rudis; Bathytoshia rudis

Species of cartilaginous fish

== Species description ==
The smalltooth stingray (Hypanus rudis) is a species of whiptail stingray within the family Dasyatidae. Very little is known about this species as it is extremely rare to find, and has not been studied thoroughly. The species was described by Albert Günther in 1870, a German zoologist, ichthyologist and herpetologist. Albert Günther initially named the species Trygon rudis; however, the currently accepted name, as recognized by the International Union for Conservation of Nature (IUCN), is Hypanus rudis. All the information we retain derives entirely from a single specimen (holotype), dating from the 19th century. The specimen has since been lost and no further evidence of the existence of the smalltooth stingray has been found.

== Biology ==
As the name suggests, this species is characterized by small teeth. Characteristic of all other stingray species, Hypanus rudis has a mouth located on its ventral side, also known as an inferior mouth, very useful for benthic feeding. However, in comparison to other recorded species of stingray, Hypanus rudis was described as having extremely narrow and fine teeth. While other stingrays such as the Atlantic stingray (H. sabinus) or Southern stingray (H. americanus) mostly feed on crustaceans, clams, and oysters on the ocean floor using their larger, broader teeth to crush hard shells, the fine, small teeth that were found on Hypanus rudis suggest they most likely were not specialized for the crushing of hard shells. We can therefore infer that smalltooth stingrays most likely feed on smaller, soft bodied creatures such as worms, small crustaceans, and molluscs on the seafloor. Additionally, similar to other stingray and shark species, we can assume that H. rudis most likely uses its snout and electroreceptors to find buried prey in the sand. These electroreceptors are called ampullae of Lorenzini, and are small, pore-like structures found on the around and beneath a shark's or stingray's rostrum (snout). They have the ability to detect the weak electric fields produced by other animals (possible prey) in front or below them.

According to Albert Günther’s original description (1870), another key feature is that the smalltooth stingray’s entire dorsal surface is covered in sets of fine, discrete prickles. This piece of information can also be inferred from the scientific name Hypanus rudis, "rudis" being the Latin word for "rough" or "unpolished".. The single specimen was recorded to have a disc width of around 63cm with a long tail over twice its length. The color is uniformly brown on its dorsal surface and a paler color on its ventral surface; this difference in coloration between dorsal and ventral sides is more commonly known as countershading. From this piece of information we can conclude that the smalltooth stingray could camouflage effectively in a sandy ocean bottom environment. There are no known differences between juvenile and adult stages. Other names H. rudis was formerly assigned to include: Trygon rudis, Dasyatis rudis, Dasybatus rudis, and Bathytoshia rudis. These changes were made due to revisions in stingray classification. Originally named “Trygon rudis” by scientist Albert Günther, “Trygon” at the time being the genus name used to describe stingrays with disc shaped bodies and long whip-like tails. With time, this primarily morphological classification was later updated due to the discovery that the genus "Trygon" was not a natural group, and that it included a variety of different species that were not very closely related. Thus, many species originally named "Trygon" were updated to a new and better defined genus called "Dasyatis". This genus referred to all flat bodied stingray species with venomous tails. Accordingly, the smalltooth stingray was thus renamed "Dasyatis rudis". Later on however, after DNA comparisons and skeletal analyses, scientists arrived at the conclusion that the genus "Dasyatis" was no longer accurate enough for the species within it, and was too broad of a classification. The scientific name for the smalltooth stingray was reassigned once more to become Hypanus rudis.

== Distribution ==
All information we have about H. rudis comes from the single specimen found in the 19th century off of the West Coast of Africa, near the Gulf of New Guinea. Based on other related species of Hypanus, we can infer that smalltooth stingrays most likely inhabited coastal and shallow marine habitats. in either sandy or muddy areas. While no specific depth is known, Hypanus species are typically found in depths ranging from 6–20 ft (0–10 m) until they migrate to deeper waters (approximately 80 ft (20 m)). Additionally, given the lack of sightings, the smalltooth stingray is considered extremely rare, or even possibly extinct.

== Life history ==
Though direct data regarding the reproduction of H. rudis has not been recorded, we can make inferences from other stingray species belonging to the same genus Hypanus and/or family Dasyatidae. Observations and collected data on the species Hypanus berthalutzae provided evidence on the species engaging in mating behavior as well as induced parturition. With this in mind, we can assume that H. rudis is likely viviparous, meaning that they give birth to already relatively developed pups. This means that smalltooth stingrays embryos are developed inside the mother, and are initially nourished through yolk and later by a uterine milk-like substance called histotroph. Similar to other species of this genus, we can assume that a typical litter size could consist of around 2–4 pups. Additionally, we can infer that the approximate lifespan of H. rudis is around 15–25 years.

Research conducted on sting venom of the species Hypanus sabinus, used as a defense mechanism against predators, was found to have growth inhibitory effects on mammalian cells. It was also found to exhibit cytotoxic effects based on concentration, meaning that the higher the venom concentration the more damage caused to cells. From this we can assume that smalltooth stingray sting venom may exhibit similar bioactive compounds with cytotoxic properties as other species from the genus Hypanus.

== Conservation Status ==
In 2020, the smalltooth stingray was assessed by the International Union for Conservation of Nature (IUCN) Red List of Threatened Species. According to criteria A2d, "population reduction in number of mature individuals calculated from a decline in catch data from fisheries, hunting data, or road kill", the species was listed as critically endangered. Due a complete absence since the first time it has been recorded, the smalltooth stingray is considered to be possibly extinct. Looking back at the time it was initially discovered, in the 19th century, there are a couple possible significant environmental and/or human factors that could have possibly led H. rudis to go extinct. In the mid to late 1800s, colonial fishing along the west African coast was a big part of the trading process. A study conducted on the southern species of stingray, Hypanus americanus, demonstrated that human initiated sounds such as sounds coming from boats or even airplanes have caused physiological stress escape responses in the species. From this piece of information, we can infer that other species of the genus Hypanus may be subject to human induced stress, and that H. rudis, having possibly lived in similarly shallow coastal environments, may have felt threatened by the increase in industrial noise and seafaring activity.

Additionally, seining and long lines were just starting to get introduced, especially in shallow coastal areas, usually where stingrays resided. Bycatch was already starting to become a major issue and due to H. rudis possibly being a very localized species, meaning that it was strictly found in specific geographical locations, sustained bycatch could have very quickly eliminated the species. The 19th century was also a period of rapid urbanization, thus increased sedimentation and runoff that may have polluted benthic habitats. Possible causes for the apparent disappearance of H. rudis can also be inferred by looking at threats to related species of stingrays within the genus Hypanus. A study on the species Hypanus guttatus has been conducted and documented increased ingestion of microplastics in coastal areas of the Atlantic Ocean. Such studies provide possible evidence for the endangerment H. rudis is currently, or may have been facing. Additionally, a lack of ecological oversight back in the early 20th century could have very well been the cause of H. rudis’ possible extinction, but we have no concrete evidence that the species does not still exist somewhere.

== Controversy ==
H. rudis’ description, only based on a single specimen which has since been lost, drives us to question the validity of the species’ existence. With no further records of the species confirmed since its original appearance in the 19th century, we cannot reject the possibility that the discovery of H. rudis may have been a simple misidentification. Some ichthyologists believe that the smalltooth stingray may have been a malformation of a stingray in the Hypanus genus such as H. americanus or H. guttatus, or possibly even a stingray from an unrelated genus. However, this is only a hypothesis, as without the original specimen, it is impossible to re-examine or make comparisons with other species of stingrays. Additionally, we can also consider the fact that the many new ray species found in the 19th century were described from very limited specimens, and identifications may not have been entirely accurate. Taxonomy during that time period was also often solely based on morphology, visible physical traits, which frequently led to inaccuracies and misidentifications more common. While some researchers question the species’ validity, others consider the species possibly extinct. It is difficult to separate a true extinction from what is considered a "taxonomic ghost," a species leaving no trace in evolutionary history. As marked on the IUCN Red List, the smalltooth stingray is considered critically endangered or possibly extinct. However, some may argue that the smalltooth stingray should have instead been classified as "Data Deficient" or "Not Valid" due to the lack of proof that H. rudis ever existed as its own unique species. Additionally, later records attributed to H. rudis such as jaws, tails or even embryos all turned out to belong to other taxa, adding to the uncertainty regarding the existence of the smalltooth stingray.
