= Brazilian large-eyed stingray =

Conservation status
- Endangered (IUCN 3.1)

Scientific classification
- Kingdom: Animalia
- Phylum: Chordata
- Class: Chondrichthyes
- Subclass: Elasmobranchii
- Order: Myliobatiformes
- Family: Dasyatidae
- Genus: Hypanus
- Species: H. marianae

Binomial name
- Hypanus marianae U. L. Gomes, R. de S. Rosa & Gadig, 2000

Synonyms
- Dasyatis macrophthalma Gomes, Rosa & Gadig, 2000

Species of cartilaginous fish

The Brazilian large-eyed stingray, Hypanus marianae, is a species of stingray in the family Dasyatidae. Endemic to northeastern Brazil, adults of this species inhabit shallow coral and sandstone reefs while the young are also found near beaches and in estuaries. This stingray measures up to 40 cm (16 in) across and can be identified by its large eyes, equally long fin folds above and below the tail, and distinctive coloration consisting of various dark brown markings on a yellowish-brown background above, and two pairs of dark brown blotches on a white background below. Reproduction is aplacental viviparous, with females giving birth to one young at a time, twice a year, and using sandbanks as nursery areas. The Brazilian large-eyed stingray is collected by artisanal fisheries and for the ornamental fish trade.

== Taxonomy and phylogeny ==
The Brazilian large-eyed stingray was described by Ulisses Gomes, Ricardo Rosa, and Otto Gadig in 2000, in the scientific journal Copeia. The authors originally intended to name the ray Dasyatis macrophthalma, but at the eleventh hour it was discovered that this name was a nomen nudum already used in an earlier paper by Ivan Sazima and Rodrigo Moura. The specific epithet for the new stingray was thus changed to marianae, in honor of Dr. Gadig's daughter Mariana Gadig, which was applied throughout the published description except in the title, where it remained macrophthalma. The authors corrected this mistake under the Principle of the First Reviser (International Code of Zoological Nomenclature Article 24.2). The type specimen is a 43 cm (17 in) long male caught off Recife, Brazil.

In 2006, Leticia de Almeida Leao Vaz and colleagues published a phylogenetic analysis, based on genomic DNA, of the Brazilian large-eyed stingray and three other common stingrays found off Brazil: the southern stingray (H. americana), the longnose stingray (H. guttatus), and the roughtail stingray (Bathytoshia centroura). They found that H. marianae is sister to a group containing H. americana and Bathytoshia centroura.

== Distribution and habitat ==
The range of the Brazilian large-eyed stingray extends along the coast of northeastern Brazil from Parcel Manoel Luís off Maranhão state to southern Bahia, though more sampling may reveal a wider distribution for this species. Occurring at depths of 2–15 m (6.6–49.2 ft), adult rays are closely associated with coral or sandstone reefs on the continental shelf, and have also been observed around shipwrecks. Younger rays inhabit nearshore sandy flats and estuaries in addition to reefs.

== Description ==
The Brazilian large-eyed stingray has a diamond-shaped pectoral fin disc approximately as long as wide, with rounded outer corners and slightly concave front margins. The tip of the snout is not strongly projecting. The eyes are large, about equal in width to the spiracles and the distance between the eyes. The mouth is small, with a transverse row of three papillae on the floor. There are 35–45 tooth rows in the upper jaw and 38–48 tooth rows in the lower jaw. The teeth of juveniles and females are blunt, while those of older males are pointed. The tail measures no longer than 1.5 times the disc width, and tapers to a filament towards the tip. There is a stinging spine on top of the tail, followed by dorsal and ventral fin folds of roughly equal length; the dorsal fold is up to twice as tall as the ventral fold.

The disc is mostly smooth, except for a row of 2–18 small, thornlike dermal denticles along the dorsal midline in adults and a single thorn on each "shoulder" in males. The coloration of this species is distinctive: the back is golden brown with the disc and pelvic fins edged by a thin blue line and then a dark brown band. There are dark brown blotches around the eyes, between the spiracles, and in two pairs behind the spiracles and further back on the disc. Adult males have blue coloring on top and at the tip of the claspers. The underside is white, darkening at the disk margin, with a pair of dark brown kidney-shaped blotches outside the gill slits, paired patches of lighter brown, irregular blotches further back, and sometimes a single dark spot at the center of the disc. The tail is brown above and white below, darkening to purple at the tip, with the fin folds dark brown and edged in blue. The largest known specimen is 31 cm (12 in) across, though individuals 40 cm (16 in) across have been seen in the wild.

== Biology and ecology ==
Like other stingrays, the Brazilian large-eyed stingray is aplacental viviparous. Females have a single functional uterus (on the left), and carry a single embryo at a time; the embryo is provisioned by yolk, and later histotroph ("uterine milk") secreted by the mother. The gestation period lasts 5–6 months, and females are able to bear two litters per year in June and in November–December. The young are birthed in coastal sandbanks 3–10 m (10–30 ft) deep, which serve as nursery areas. Newly born rays measure 13–14 cm (5.1–5.5 in) across; females mature later and attain a larger ultimate size than males. The distinctive ventral blotches appear relatively suddenly as the ray ages; the paired blotches outside the gills develop first, followed by the blotches further back. A known predator of this species is the cobia (Rachycentron canadum).

== Human interactions ==
Divers at Arquipelago de Abrolhos off Bahia state have reported that adult Brazilian large-eyed stingrays "behaved docilely" toward them. This species is caught by artisanal fisheries in limited numbers, and is also collected for the private aquarium trade in Bahia; the impact of these practices on the population is unknown. Habitat degradation may also pose a threat to this species, although its range does overlap several Brazilian Marine Protected Areas (MPAs), including Parque Estadual do Parcel Manuel Luiz off Maranhão and Parque Nacional Marinho dos Abrolhos off Bahia. The International Union for Conservation of Nature (IUCN) assesses the conservation status of this species as endangered.
