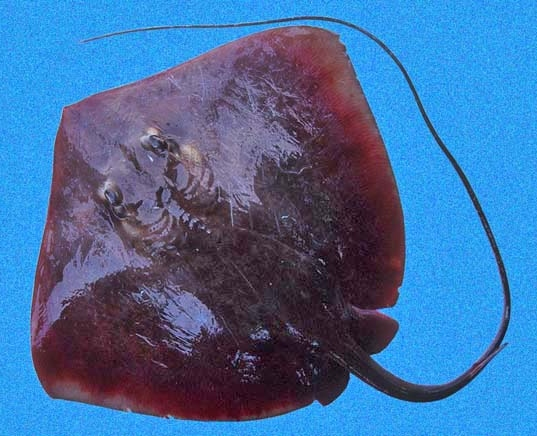

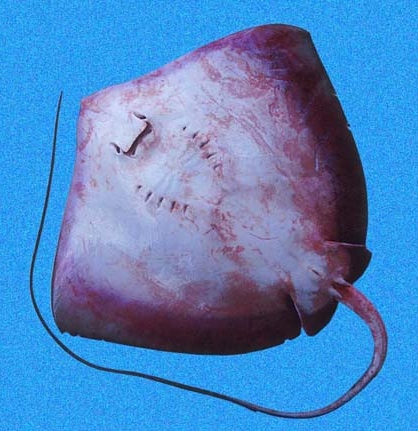

Conservation status
- Vulnerable (IUCN 3.1)

Scientific classification
- Kingdom: Animalia
- Phylum: Chordata
- Class: Chondrichthyes
- Subclass: Elasmobranchii
- Order: Myliobatiformes
- Family: Dasyatidae
- Genus: Hypanus
- Species: H. longus

Binomial name
- Hypanus longus (Garman, 1880)
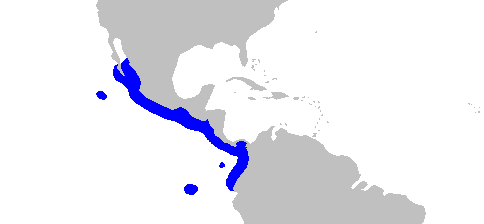
- Range of the longtail stingray

Synonyms
- Dasyatis longa Garman, 1880; Trygon longa Garman, 1880

= Longtail stingray =

Species of cartilaginous fish

The longtail stingray (Hypanus longus, often misspelled longa), is a species of stingray in the family Dasyatidae, found in the eastern Pacific Ocean from Baja California to Colombia. It inhabits sandy habitats down to a depth of 90 m (300 ft). Measuring up to 1.56 m (5.1 ft) across, this species has a rhomboid pectoral fin disc, a lower (but not upper) fin fold on the tail, and numerous dermal denticles along the back and behind the stinging spine. The longtail stingray feeds mainly on bottom-dwelling bony fishes and crustaceans. It is aplacental viviparous, with females giving birth to 1–5 young in late summer. It is caught for food, likely throughout its range, but specific fishery data is lacking.

== Taxonomy and phylogeny ==
American zoologist Samuel Garman published the original description of the longtail stingray in an 1880 issue of the scientific journal Bulletin of the Museum of Comparative Zoology. He gave it the name Trygon longa, in reference to the long tail, and designated a specimen from Acapulco, Mexico and another from Panama as the syntypes. Subsequent authors placed this species in the genus Dasyatis. A 2001 phylogenetic analysis by Lisa Rosenberger, based on morphological characters, found that the southern stingray (H. americanus) of the western Atlantic is the sister species of the longtail stingray. These two species may have evolutionarily diverged with the formation of the Isthmus of Panama (c. 3 Ma).

== Distribution and habitat ==
The longtail stingray is found along the tropical Pacific coast of the Americas, from central Baja California (though it may occur as far north as San Diego, California) to Colombia, including the Revillagigedo and Galapagos Islands. This species inhabits sandy or muddy flats to a depth of 90 m (300 ft), often near rocky or coral reefs, or in estuaries. In the Galapagos, it was reportedly abundant in the shallow lagoons of mangrove swamps at Fernandina Island.

== Description ==
The longtail stingray reaches a maximum known disc width of 1.58 m (5.2 ft), length of 2.57 m (8.4 ft), and weight of 46.4 kg (102 lb). It has a diamond-shaped pectoral fin disc about a sixth wider than long, with the outer corners broadly rounded. The front margins are nearly straight, meeting the tip of the snout at a blunt angle. There is a row of five papillae across the floor of the mouth; the two on the sides are smaller than the others. The pelvic fins are rounded. The whip-like tail bears a stinging spine and measures more than twice as long as the disc. Behind the spine, the tail becomes laterally compressed with a low keel above and a short, narrow fin fold below.

There is a row of pointed tubercles running along the midline of the back from between the "shoulders" to the base of the tail. Two much shorter rows of smaller tubercles, slightly converging backward, are found alongside the central row behind the shoulders. Numerous small dermal denticles are also found between the eyes and on the tail behind the spine. The dorsal coloration varies from plain reddish-brown to dark gray, and the underside is light. The extent of denticle coverage and number of oral papillae can vary among individuals. The longtail stingray closely resembles the diamond stingray (H. dipterura), which is found in the same region, but can be distinguished by its lack of an upper tail fold. The length of the tail is not a reliable diagnostic character for this species, as it is frequently damaged.

== Biology and ecology ==
Apparently solitary in nature, the longtail stingray is a predator of bottom-dwelling bony fishes and invertebrates, in particular stomatopods, decapods, and molluscs. Known parasites of this species include the tapeworms Acanthobothrium cimari, A. cleofanus, A. costarricense, A. puntarenasense, and A. vargasi, Anthocephalum lukei and A. michaeli, Parachristianella dimegacantha, Pseudochristianella elegantissima and P. nudiscula, and Pterobothrioides carvajali, and the monogenean Listrocephalos whittingtoni. Like other stingrays, the longtail stingray is aplacental viviparous with the developing embryos sustained initially by yolk and later by histotroph ("uterine milk") produced by the mother. Adult females have a single functional ovary. Near-term females appear to swim into shallow estuaries and tidal creeks to give birth, following a gestation period of 10–11 months, and may mate again immediately after. A litter contains 1–5 young, each measuring about 40 cm (16 in) across. Males mature sexually at 0.8 m (2.6 ft) across, and females at 1.1 m (3.6 ft) across.

== Human interactions ==
The tail spine of the longtail stingray is potentially dangerous to humans. This species is of some commercial importance in Mexico, where it is sold fresh or dried and salted. This species is likely landed by inshore fisheries targeting shark and ray throughout Central America; it is caught by bottom trawls and longlines, and is especially susceptible to gillnets as its tail spine easily becomes entangled in the mesh. The impact of fishing on its population is unknown, as fishery landings in the region are poorly monitored and the longtail stingray is not reported separately from other ray species. The International Union for Conservation of Nature (IUCN) has listed this species as vulnerable, while noting that its slow reproductive rate would limit its capacity to recover from over-exploitation.
