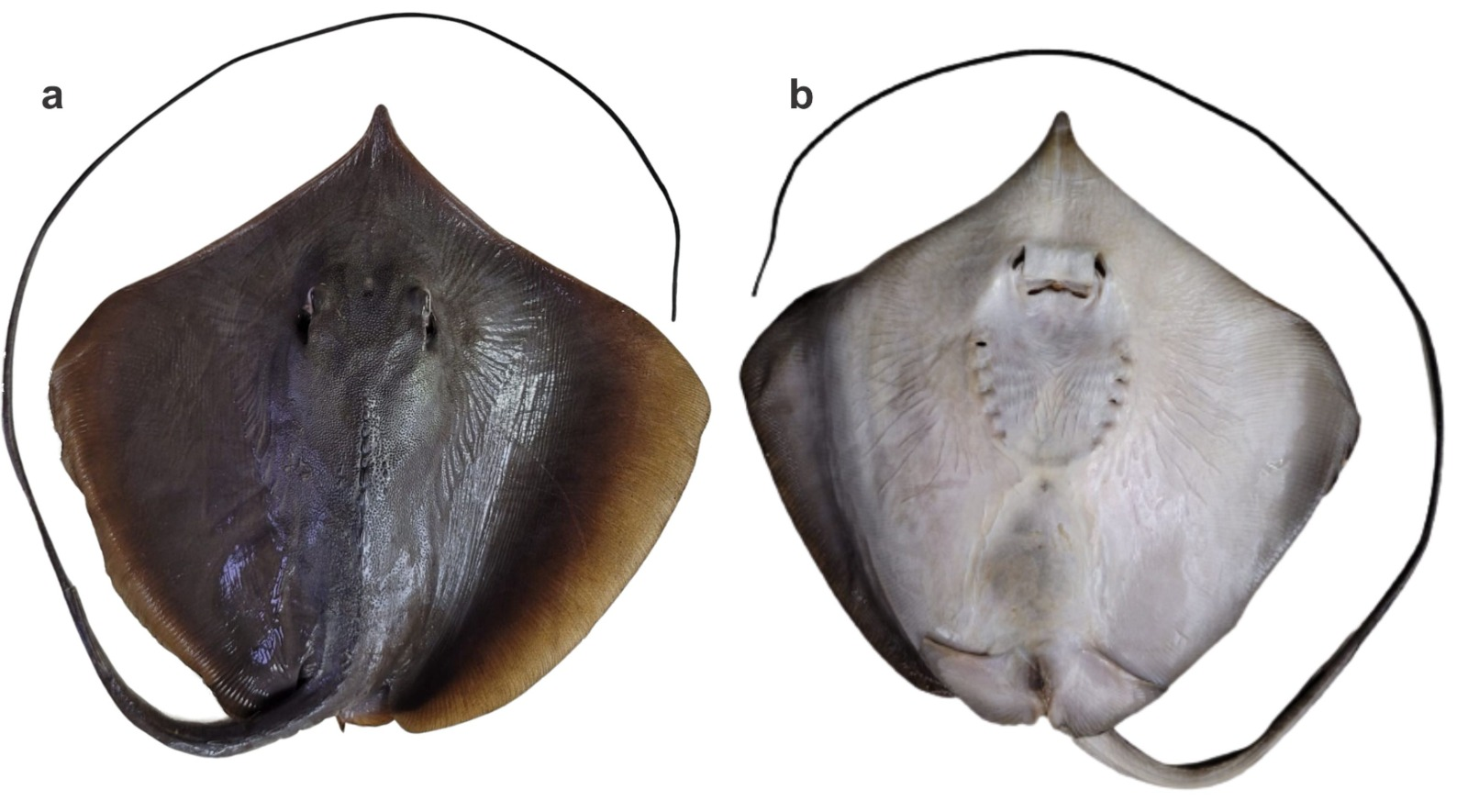
- Specimen

Scientific classification
- Kingdom: Animalia
- Phylum: Chordata
- Class: Chondrichthyes
- Subclass: Elasmobranchii
- Order: Myliobatiformes
- Family: Dasyatidae
- Genus: Hypanus
- Species: H. rubioi

Binomial name
- Hypanus rubioi Mejía-Falla, Navia, Cardeñosa & Tavera, 2025

= Hypanus rubioi =

Species of cartilaginous fish

Hypanus rubioi, commonly known as the longnose pacific stingray, is a species of cartilaginous fish in the stingray family Dasyatidae. It is endemic to the coastal marine waters of the Eastern tropical Pacific Ocean, specifically along the Pacific coast of Colombia. Described as a novel species in early 2025, H. rubioi is a large-bodied benthic predator characterized by its exceptionally long, sharply pointed snout, an elongated slender tail, and distinct morphometric proportions that distinguish it from other sympatric stingrays in its range.

== Taxonomy and naming ==
The longnose pacific stingray was formally described by marine biologists P. A. Mejía-Falla, A. F. Navia, D. Cardeñosa, and J. Tavera. The official species description was published on February 18, 2025, in the peer-reviewed scientific journal Ichthyology & Herpetology. Prior to its formal taxonomic description, populations of H. rubioi may have been misidentified or grouped alongside other similar long-snouted rays native to the Eastern Pacific region due to the subtle morphological overlaps within the genus Hypanus.

The holotype specimen, utilized to establish the primary physical characteristics of the new taxon, is a large individual measuring 1,897 mm (74.7 in) in total length. The discovery of H. rubioi underscores the ongoing need for detailed morphological and genetic assessments in the Eastern Tropical Pacific, a region known for high levels of undocumented marine biodiversity and cryptic species complexes among elasmobranchs.

== Description ==
Hypanus rubioi is categorized as a large-sized species within its genus, capable of attaining a disc width (DW) of approximately 1,250 mm (49.2 in). The overall body plan follows the typical dasyatid morphology, but it is heavily modified with distinct proportional adaptations suited for its specific ecological niche.

=== Disc and head morphology ===
The pectoral fin disc of H. rubioi is roughly equal in width to its length, or slightly wider, with the disc length (DL) fitting 1.0 to 1.1 times into the disc width. The front-side margins of the pectoral disc are distinctly concave, leading to a highly specialized, elongated snout. The rostrum is pointed and protrudes sharply from the main body of the disc, terminating at a rostrum angle that ranges between 93° and 105°. The preoral length (the distance from the tip of the snout to the mouth) is exceptionally long, representing 28% to 32% of the total disc width.The sensory and respiratory structures on the ventral side of the head are precisely spaced. The distance between the nostrils measures between 9% and 11% of the disc width, while the distance between the first gill slits accounts for 17% to 19% of the disc width. The eyes are relatively small when compared to the overall mass of the fish; the eye diameter measures only 1.7% to 3.4% of the disc width. Furthermore, the small eyes fit 4 to 9 times within the interorbital distance (the space across the top of the head between the eyes).

=== Tail and defensive sting ===
One of the most prominent features of H. rubioi is its extremely long and slender tail. The tail measures between 2.4 and 3.1 times the entire length of the pectoral disc. At the posterior end of the pelvic fins, the width of the tail is 0.6 to 1.1 times its height, indicating a relatively cylindrical base that tapers rapidly.Ventrally, the tail features a low and slender fin fold. The length of this ventral fold is proportional to 1.6 to 2.7 times the disc width, and it is extremely shallow, with its length measuring 13 to 25 times its depth below the posterior end of the pelvic fin. The distance from the anterior cloaca to the venomous caudal sting fits 0.4 to 0.8 times into the precloacal length.

== See also ==
- Diamond stingray
- Longtail stingray
