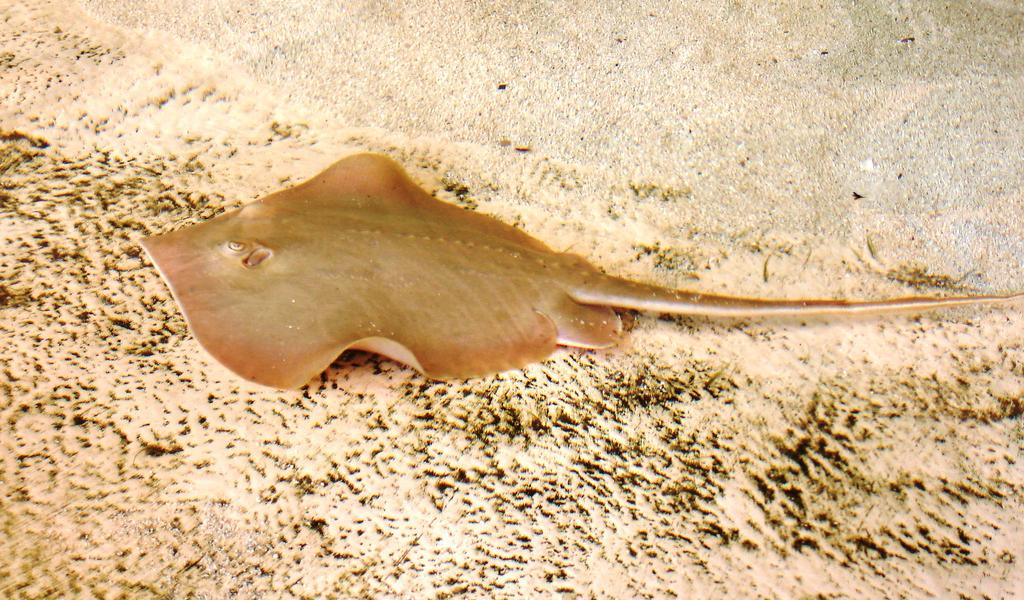

Conservation status
- Least Concern (IUCN 3.1)

Scientific classification
- Kingdom: Animalia
- Phylum: Chordata
- Class: Chondrichthyes
- Subclass: Elasmobranchii
- Order: Myliobatiformes
- Family: Dasyatidae
- Genus: Hypanus
- Species: H. sabinus

Binomial name
- Hypanus sabinus (Lesueur, 1824)
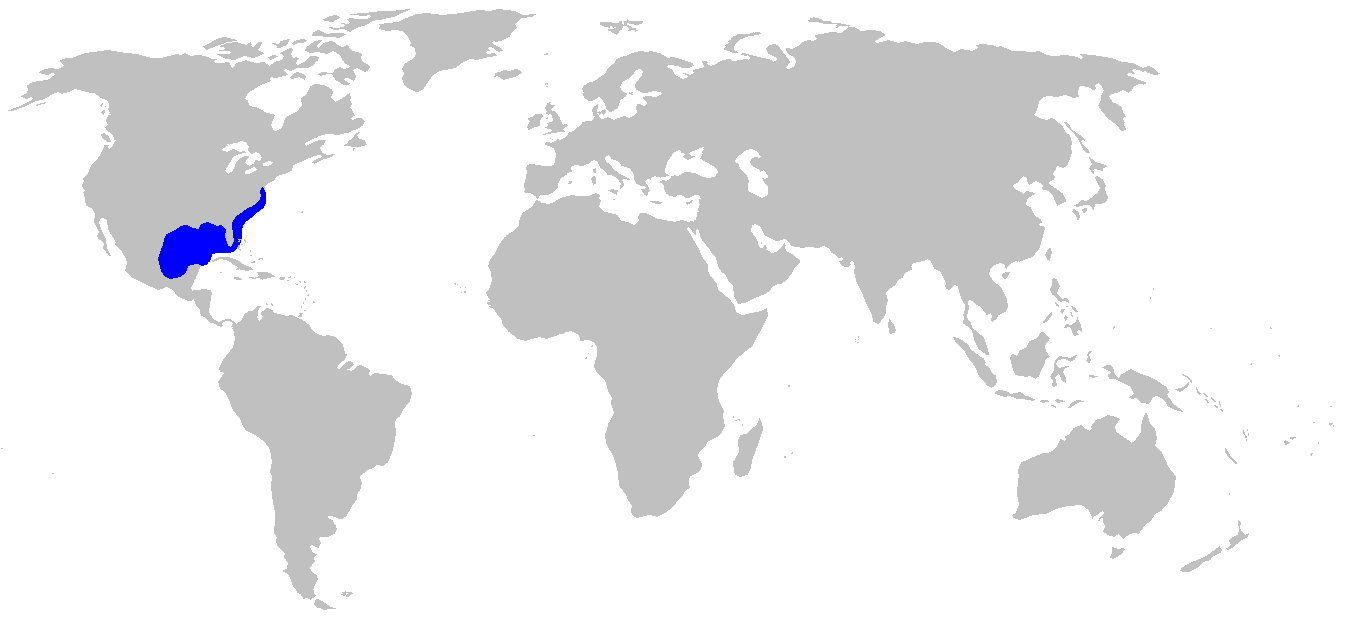
- Range of the Atlantic stingray

Synonyms
- Amphotistius sabinus (Lesueur, 1824); Dasyatis sabina (Lesueur, 1824); Trygon sabina Lesueur, 1824

= Atlantic stingray =

Species of cartilaginous fish

The Atlantic stingray (Hypanus sabinus) is a species of stingray in the family Dasyatidae, common along the Atlantic coast of North America from the Chesapeake Bay to Mexico, including brackish and freshwater habitats. It may be distinguished from other stingrays in the area by its relatively elongated snout. This species is of little commercial importance, other than for sale in the aquarium industry.

== Taxonomy and phylogeny ==
The Atlantic stingray was described by French naturalist Charles Alexandre Lesueur as Trygon sabina, in an 1824 volume of the Journal of the Academy of Natural Sciences of Philadelphia. He based his account on a damaged male specimen collected by American naturalist Titian Ramsay Peale during the Academy's 1817 expedition to Florida. Since then, various authors have included this species in the obsolete genera Pastinaca, Dasybatus (or the variants Dasibatis and Dasybatis), and Amphotistius, all of which were eventually synonymized with the genus Dasyatis.

A 2001 phylogenetic analysis by Lisa Rosenberger, based on morphology, found that the Atlantic stingray is one of the more basal members of its genus. It is the outgroup to a large clade that contains, amongst others, the southern stingray (H. americana), the roughtail stingray (Bathytoshia centroura), the longnose stingray (H. guttata), and the pearl stingray (Fontitrygon margaritella).

== Distribution and habitat ==
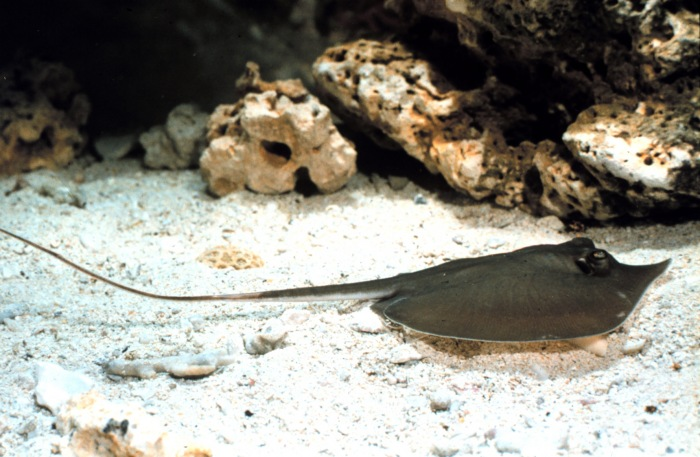
The Atlantic stingray is found over fine substrates.

The Atlantic Stingray is found in the western Atlantic Ocean from the Chesapeake Bay southward to Florida and the Gulf of Mexico, to as far as Campeche, Mexico. Records of this species from Grenada, Suriname, and Brazil are doubtful and may represent other species. The Atlantic stingray is capable of tolerating varying salinities and can enter freshwater; it has been reported from the Mississippi River, Lake Pontchartrain, Winyah Bay, and the St. Johns River in Florida. The stingrays in the St. Johns River system represent the only permanent freshwater elasmobranch population in North America.

This species inhabits shallow coastal waters over sandy or silty bottoms, estuaries, and lakes. They prefer water temperatures over 15 °C (59 °F) and can tolerate temperatures over 30 °C (86 °F). These stingrays conduct seasonal migrations to stay in warmer water: they are only present in the northerly Chesapeake Bay in the summer and fall, and elsewhere they migrate to deeper water in the winter. When inshore, they usually stay at depths of 2–6 m (6.6–19.7 ft), and after migrating offshore they may be found as deep as 25 m (82 ft).

== Description ==
One of the smallest stingray species, the Atlantic stingray attains a maximum length of 61 cm (24 in) and a weight of 4.9 kg (11 lb). It has a spade-shaped pectoral fin disk 1.1 times as wide as long, with rounded corners and concave anterior margins. The snout is relatively long. There are three stout papillae on the floor of the mouth; the teeth are rounded, with a flat, blunt surface. During the reproductive season, the teeth of mature males change to feature long, sharp cusps that curve towards the corners of the mouth, for gripping onto females during mating. The tail is long and whip-like, with a serrated spine measuring a quarter of the width of the disk. The spine is replaced annually between June and October. Dorsal and ventral fin folds are present on the tail.

Larger Atlantic stingrays develop tubercles or thorns along the midline of the back to the origin of the tail spine. Some larger females also develop tubercles around the eyes and spiracles. The coloration is brown or yellowish brown above, becoming lighter towards the margin of the disk and sometimes with a dark stripe along the midline, and white or light gray below. The tail fin folds are yellowish. In larger individuals the tail may be flecked with gray near the base and completely dark towards the tip.

== Biology and ecology ==
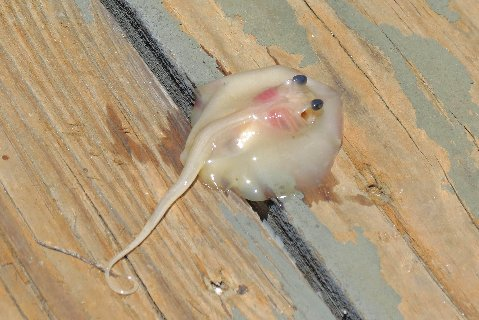
A fetal Atlantic stingray

The Atlantic stingray feeds mostly on benthic invertebrates such as bivalves, tube anemones, amphipods, crustaceans, and nereid worms, which they locate using their electroreceptive ampullae of Lorenzini. The exact composition of their diet varies by geographical location. When feeding, these rays will position themselves facing the current so that the sediment will be washed away. Numerous species of sharks, such as the tiger shark (Galeocerdo cuvier) and the bull shark (Carcharhinas leucas), are major predators of the Atlantic stingray. In freshwater habitats, they may be preyed upon by American alligators (Alligator mississippiensis). A known parasite of freshwater Atlantic stingrays is Argulus, a fish louse that feeds on skin mucus.

Despite having a regular freshwater presence, the Atlantic stingray is physiologically euryhaline and no population has evolved the specialized osmoregulatory mechanisms found in the river stingrays of the family Potamotrygonidae. This may be due to the relatively recent date of freshwater colonization (under one million years), and/or possibly incomplete genetic isolation of the freshwater populations, as they remain capable of surviving in salt water. Freshwater Atlantic stingrays have only 30–50% the concentration of urea and other osmolytes in their blood compared to marine populations. However, the osmotic pressure between their internal fluids and external environment still causes water to diffuse into their bodies, and they must produce large quantities of dilute urine (at 10 times the rate of marine individuals) to compensate.

Like other stingrays, the Atlantic stingray is viviparous. Both marine and freshwater populations in Florida have an annual mating season from September or October to April, though ovulation does not occur until late March or early April. Courtship involves the male following the female and biting at her body and fins, and the male will grip onto the female's pectoral fin to assist in copulation. The embryos are sustained by a yolk sac until around day 60, after which they are nourished by uterine milk secreted by the mother (histotrophy). Litters of 1–4 young are born from late July to early August, after a gestation period of 4–4.5 months. Newborns measure 10–13 centimetres (3.9–5.1 in) wide. Marine males mature at a disk width of 20 cm (7.9 in) and females at a disk width of 24 cm (9.4 in). Freshwater males mature at a disk width of 21 cm (8.3 in) and females at a disk width of 22 cm (8.7 in).

== Human interactions ==
If stepped on, the Atlantic stingray can inflict a painful, though rarely life-threatening wound. Large numbers of Atlantic stingrays are caught as bycatch in gillnets targeting flounder off North Carolina, but most are released alive. They are also caught as bycatch in small numbers in recreational and commercial trout gillnets, shark drift nets, and nearshore trawls. As there is no fishery targeting this species and bycatch mortality appears to be low, it was assessed as of Least Concern by the World Conservation Union. However, some localized freshwater populations have shown reduced health and reproduction due to declining water quality.
