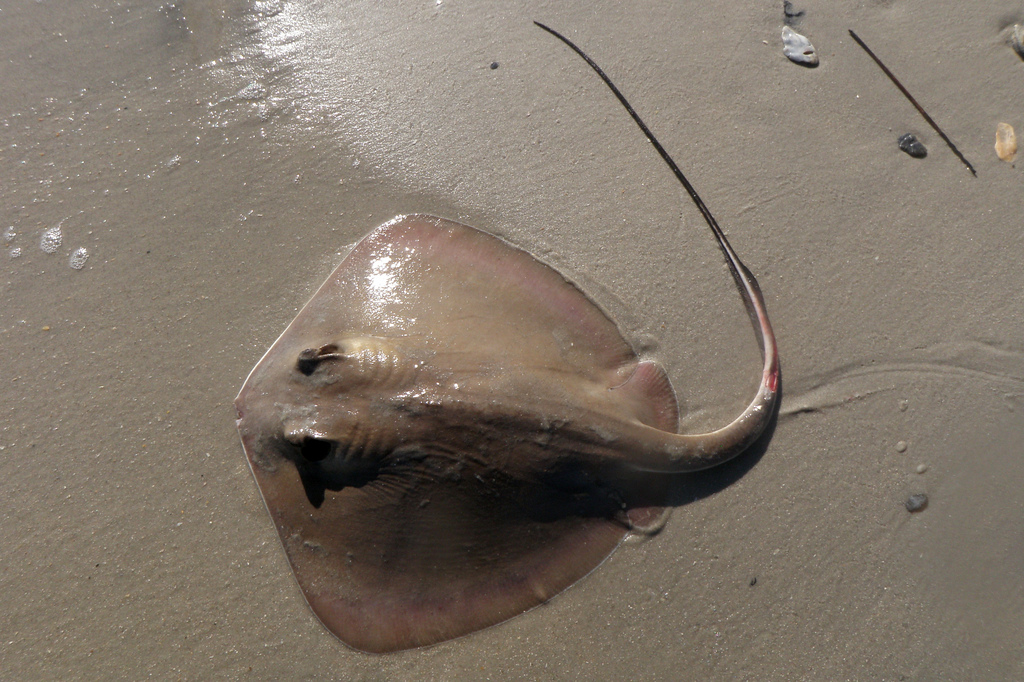
- H. say

Scientific classification
- Kingdom: Animalia
- Phylum: Chordata
- Class: Chondrichthyes
- Subclass: Elasmobranchii
- Order: Myliobatiformes
- Family: Dasyatidae
- Subfamily: Dasyatinae
- Genus: Hypanus; Rafinesque, 1818

Type species
- Raja say Lesueur, 1817

= Hypanus =

Genus of cartilaginous fishes

Hypanus is a genus of stingrays in the family Dasyatidae from warmer parts of the East Pacific and Atlantic, including the Caribbean and Gulf of Mexico. The genus was previous regarded as a junior synonym of the genus Dasyatis.

== Species ==
Eleven species are recognised by Eschmeyer's Catalog of Fishes. The placement of H. marianae and H. rudis within the genus is provisional, pending more thorough investigation.

- Hypanus americanus (Hildebrand & Schroeder, 1928) (Southern stingray)
- Hypanus berthalutzae Petean, Naylor & Lima, 2020 (Lutz's stingray)
- Hypanus dipterurus (Jordan & Gilbert, 1880) (Diamond stingray)
- Hypanus geijskesi (Boeseman 1948)
- Hypanus guttatus (Bloch & Schneider, 1801) (Longnose stingray)
- Hypanus longus (Garman, 1880) (Longtail stingray)
- Hypanus marianae (Gomes, Rosa & Gadig, 2000) (Brazilian large-eyed stingray)
- Hypanus rubioi Mejía-Falla, Navia, Cardeñosa & Tavera, 2025 (Longnose Pacific stingray?)
- Hypanus rudis (Günther, 1870) (Smalltooth stingray)
- Hypanus sabinus (Lesueur, 1824) (Atlantic stingray)
- Hypanus say (Lesueur, 1817) (Bluntnose stingray)
