= Hypanus berthalutzae =

Conservation status
- Vulnerable (IUCN 3.1)

Scientific classification
- Kingdom: Animalia
- Phylum: Chordata
- Class: Chondrichthyes
- Subclass: Elasmobranchii
- Order: Myliobatiformes
- Family: Dasyatidae
- Genus: Hypanus
- Species: H. berthalutzae

Binomial name
- Hypanus berthalutzae Petean, Naylor & Lima, 2020

Species of cartilaginous fish

Hypanus berthalutzae, known as Lutz's stingray, is a species of stingray in the family Dasyatidae first described in 2020. Its typical size is unknown, though the largest known specimen was 68 cm (27 in) wide. Most known specimens are female.

== Distribution and habitat ==
The species occurs exclusively in shallow waters off of Brazilian coasts.

== Description ==
The species has a kite-shaped disc, that is slightly wider than long. Its eyes relatively large and protruding, with small spiracles directly behind.

This stingray has a unique ratio of 16:1 females to males.

== Human interaction ==
It is frequently caught as a bycatch in different fisheries. Recent studies have been performed in order to determine the prevalence of this species.
