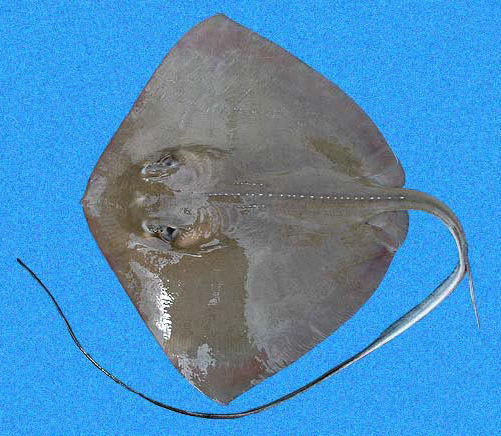

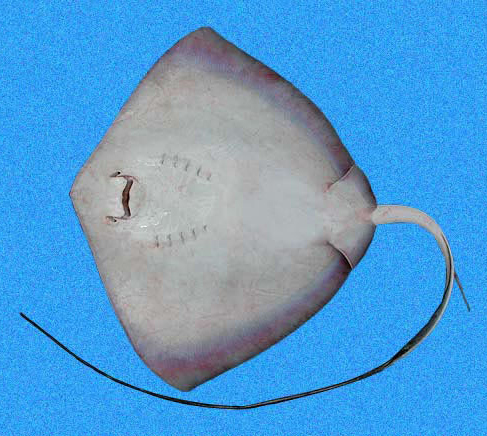

Conservation status
- Near Threatened (IUCN 3.1)

Scientific classification
- Kingdom: Animalia
- Phylum: Chordata
- Class: Chondrichthyes
- Subclass: Elasmobranchii
- Order: Myliobatiformes
- Family: Dasyatidae
- Genus: Hypanus
- Species: H. americanus

Binomial name
- Hypanus americanus (Hildebrand & Schroeder, 1928)
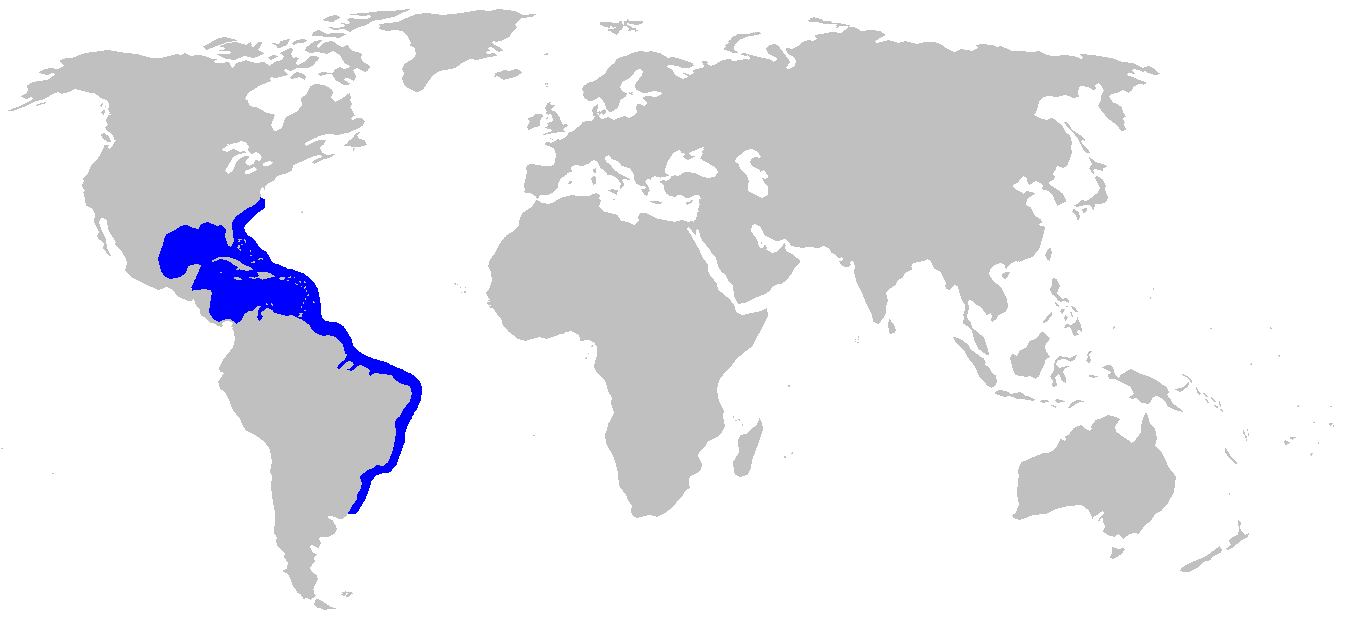
- Range of the southern stingray

Synonyms
- Dasyatis americana Hildebrand & Schroeder, 1928

= Southern stingray =

Species of fish

The southern stingray (Hypanus americanus) is a whiptail stingray found in tropical and subtropical waters of the Western Atlantic Ocean from New Jersey to southern Brazil. It has a flat, diamond-shaped disc, with a mud brown, olive, and grey dorsal surface and white underbelly (ventral surface). The barb on its tail is serrated and covered in a venomous mucus, used for self-defense.

== Description ==
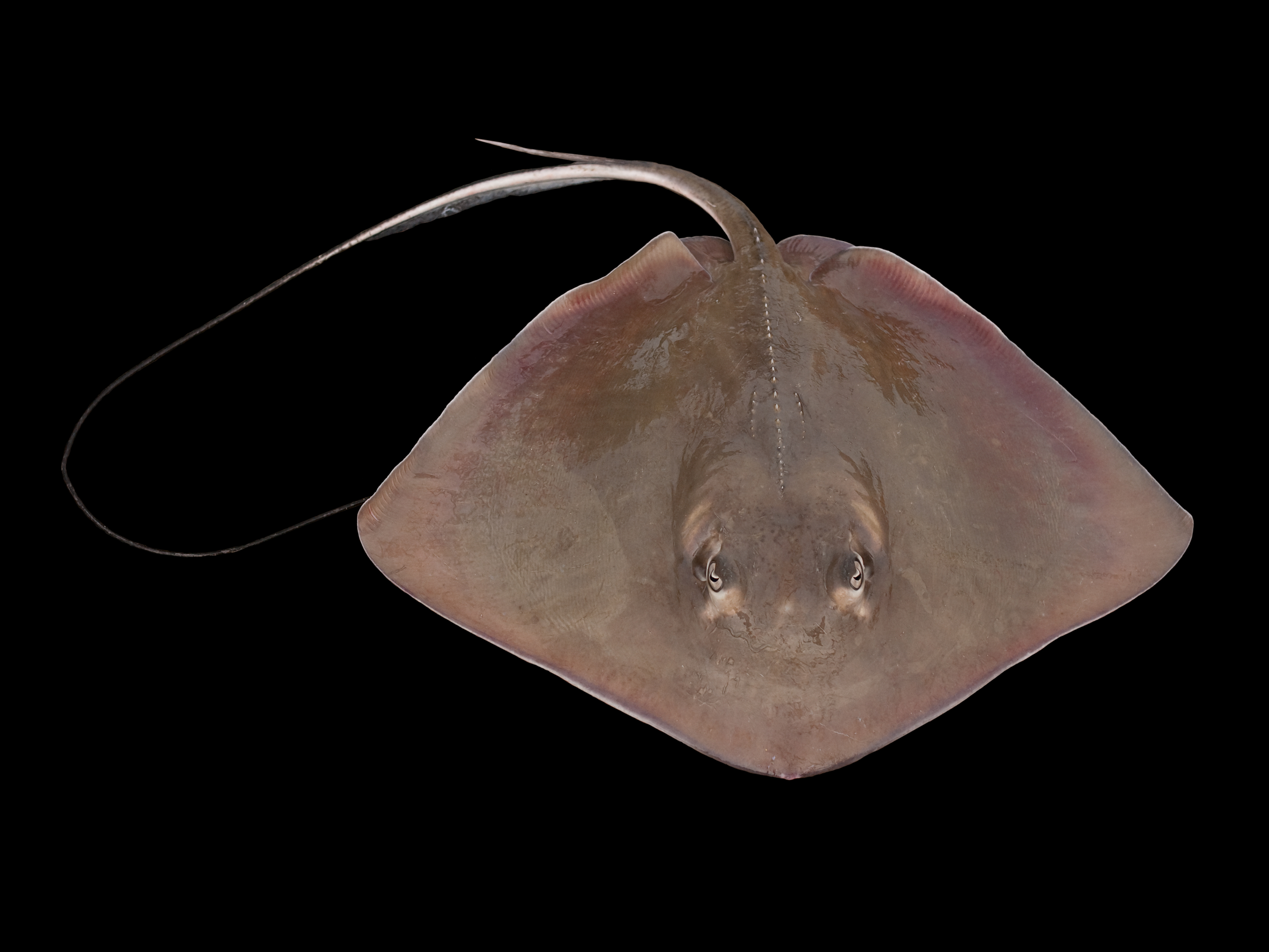
Southern stingray

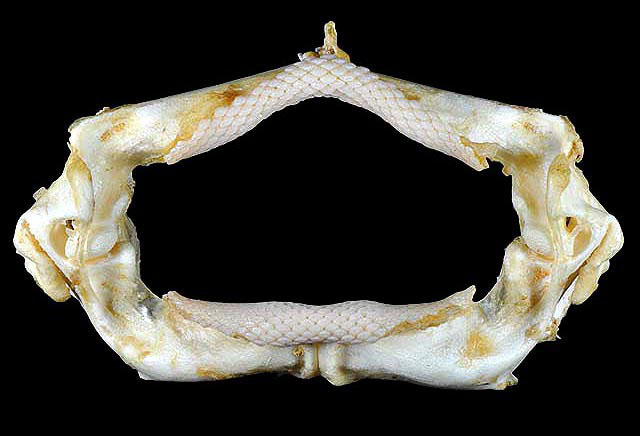
Jaws

The southern stingray is adapted for life on the sea bed. Its flattened, diamond-shaped body is more angular than other rays. The top of the body varies between olive brown and green in adults, dark grey in juveniles, whilst the underside is white. The wing-like pectoral fins are used to propel the stingray across the ocean bottom, whilst the slender tail possesses a long, serrated and venomous spine at the base, used for defense. These spines are not fatal to humans, but are incredibly painful if stepped on. The eyes are situated on top of the head of the southern stingray, along with small openings called spiracles. The location of the spiracles enables the stingray to take in water whilst lying on the seabed, or when partially buried in sediment. Water enters the spiracles and leaves through the gill openings, bypassing the mouth which is on the underside. Female stingrays can grow to a disc width of 150 centimetres (59 in), while the smaller male stingrays reach a maximum size of 67 centimetres (26 in).

== Behavior ==
Southern stingrays are nocturnal predators, who spray water from their mouths or flap their fins vigorously to disturb the substrate and expose hidden prey. This bottom-dwelling species is often found singly or in pairs, and can reach population densities estimated up to 245 per square kilometre (630/mi^{2}) in certain shallow systems thought to be nursery grounds. Hypanus americanus exhibit wave-like locomotion using their pectoral fins. This wave-like motion is important for H. americanus because it allows them to escape predators, forage efficiently, and generally maneuver quickly. Typically, they travel large distances and their foraging area is very expansive. One study provided observations that H. americanus swim along the tide, because of the greater food availability along tides. H. americanus are able to do this because of their high maneuverability and efficient wave-like locomotion. H. americanus either remain solitary or form groups. Groups of H. americanus are usually observed when they mate, for predator protection or even when they are just resting.

=== Foraging ===
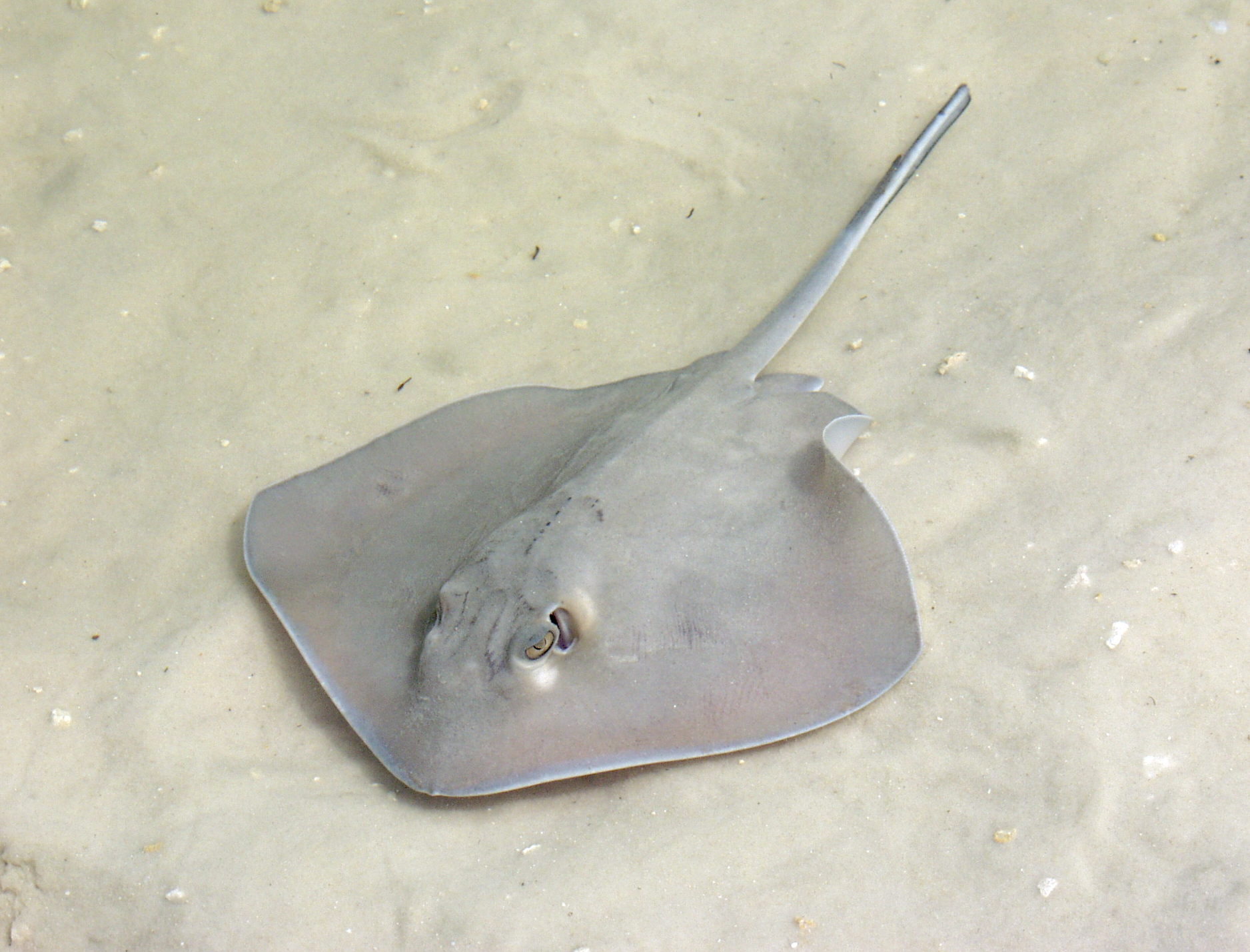
Southern stingray lying on the sea bed

When scientists revealed the contents of the stomach of one Hypanus americanus, they found evidence of a great variety of ingested prey, including small fishes, worms, crustaceans and bivalves. As mentioned earlier in this article, the H. americanus are smooth and efficient swimmers, allowing them to capture a variety of mobile as well as sessile prey. They are opportunistic feeders and continuous foragers.

=== Predation ===
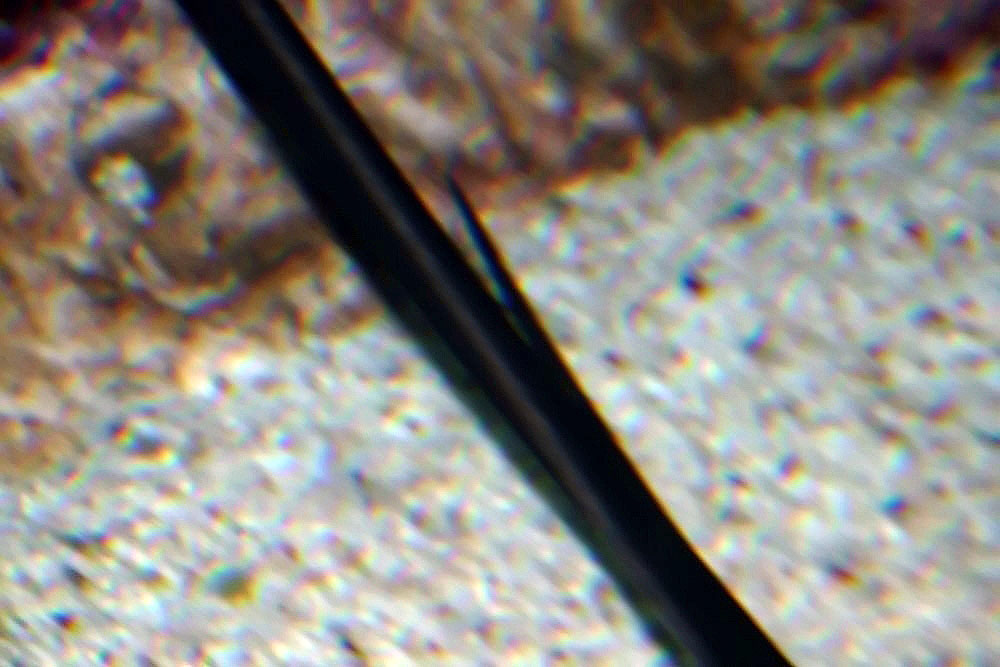
A venomous spine near the base of the tail

To avoid predators, Hypanus americanus bury themselves in substrate. Venomous spines on the tail are used to repel predators, including humans and great hammerhead sharks.

=== Roles within their ecosystems ===
In shallow waters, there is a commensal foraging relationship between Hypanus americanus fish and Nannopterum auritum birds in coastal areas generally like the Gulf of Mexico. When foraging, the H. americanus dig through the substrate in search of food; however, this also helps to expose certain other fish hidden in the substrate after which the N. auritum will follow behind the H. americanus and eat.

=== Reproduction ===
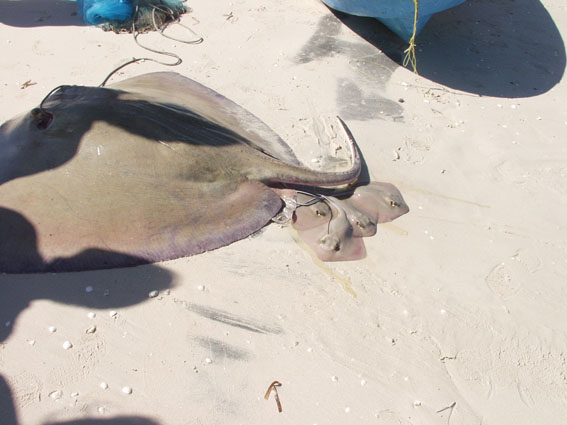
Southern stingray mother and pups

Hypanus americanus are ovoviviparous. Fertilized eggs develop inside the mother's body. The embryos receive nutrients from the yolk sack early in development. After the yolk sac is absorbed, the embryos obtain nutrients from the histotroph (the mother's uterine milk). Females reproduce annually. This species gives live birth after a pregnancy which usually lasts between seven and eight months. Parental care ceases once the young are born. In captivity, gestation lasted 135 to 226 days, after which a litter of two to ten young were born.

There is little knowledge or published evidence about the mating systems of H. americanus. Mating stingrays are rarely encountered in the wild. One study, however, does provide detailed observations of H. americanus mating. This study involves observations of one female mating with two males. The study mentions that the female was chased by the two males, with one of the male's biting (or "catching") the female's fin and releasing her after copulation. Females have the ability to mate again soon after giving birth.

==== Sexual maturity and nursery type ====
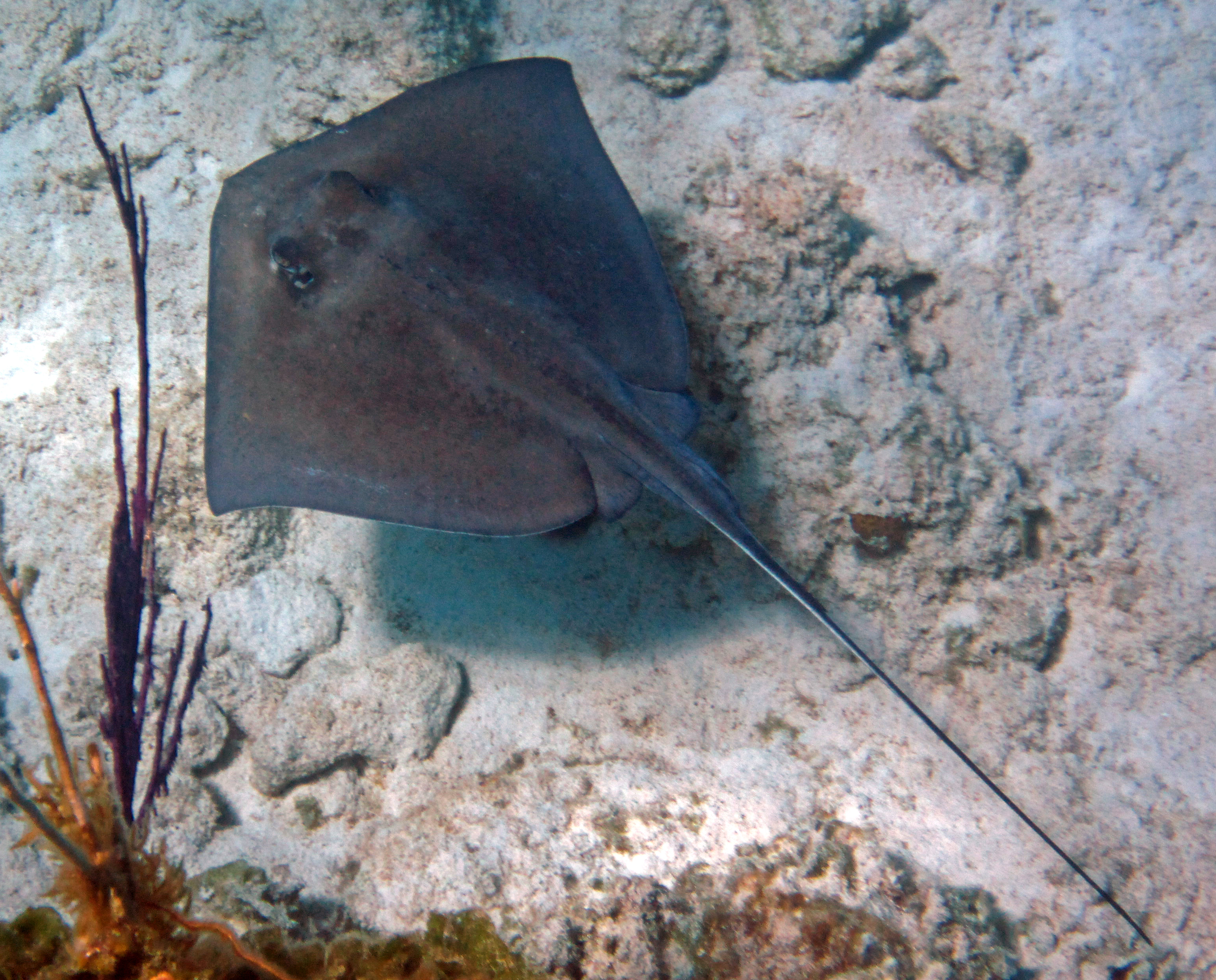
A young Southern stingray

Geographical location plays a large role in the age of sexual maturity. Observations from studies of breeding behavior (of Hypanus americanus during August at Bimini, Bahamas, and early September in Grand Cayman, Cayman Islands). One study shows that when females were placed in captivity, they were considered mature when they were impregnated (around 5 or 6 years old). In this case, males who were 3 or 4 years old were considered to be mature. There is also a difference in the rate at which the females bear young, depending on whether they are raised in captive natural environments or in natural environments. Females raised in captivity bear offspring twice a year, and females that are raised in the wild bear offspring once a year. In addition, there is a positive correlation between the size of the mother and the number of offspring. There is a difference in nurseries for where the H. americanus offspring are raised: there are primary and secondary nurseries which have a clear distinction. The primary nursery is defined as a habitat where a female H. americanus gives birth to her young. On the other hand, the secondary nursery is a habitat where the juvenile H. americanus are raised to mature adults. Little evidence about locations of and migrations between the primary and secondary nurseries is known. An example of a primary nursery is in Belize, where H. americanus females pay seasonal visits for the purposes of mating and giving birth to offspring. During one study, juvenile H. americanus were caught by scientists at 10 to 20 m depths on rock reef surfaces nearby during the months of May, November and December. This specific location of where these juvenile H. americanus were collected was believed to be a secondary nursery.

==== Communication ====
Studies of Hypanus americanus have shown that they communicate through pheromone signaling. Males communicate with females before copulating by touching and biting the females. Also, after the female gives birth, she releases pheromones that are most likely believed to be produced in her cloaca; one study reported that the birth of offspring attracted males. As previously mentioned in the article, since a female has the ability to mate soon after giving birth, it is plausible that these are sex pheromones. The role of pheromones in communication also make sense since H. americanus have strong senses of smell. They have many Ampullae of Lorenzini, usually heavily concentrated around the head. In addition, this gives them the ability to sense certain electric fields which are emitted from hidden prey. In addition, they have special mechanisms for senses vibrations in the water as well as for hearing.

== Human interaction ==
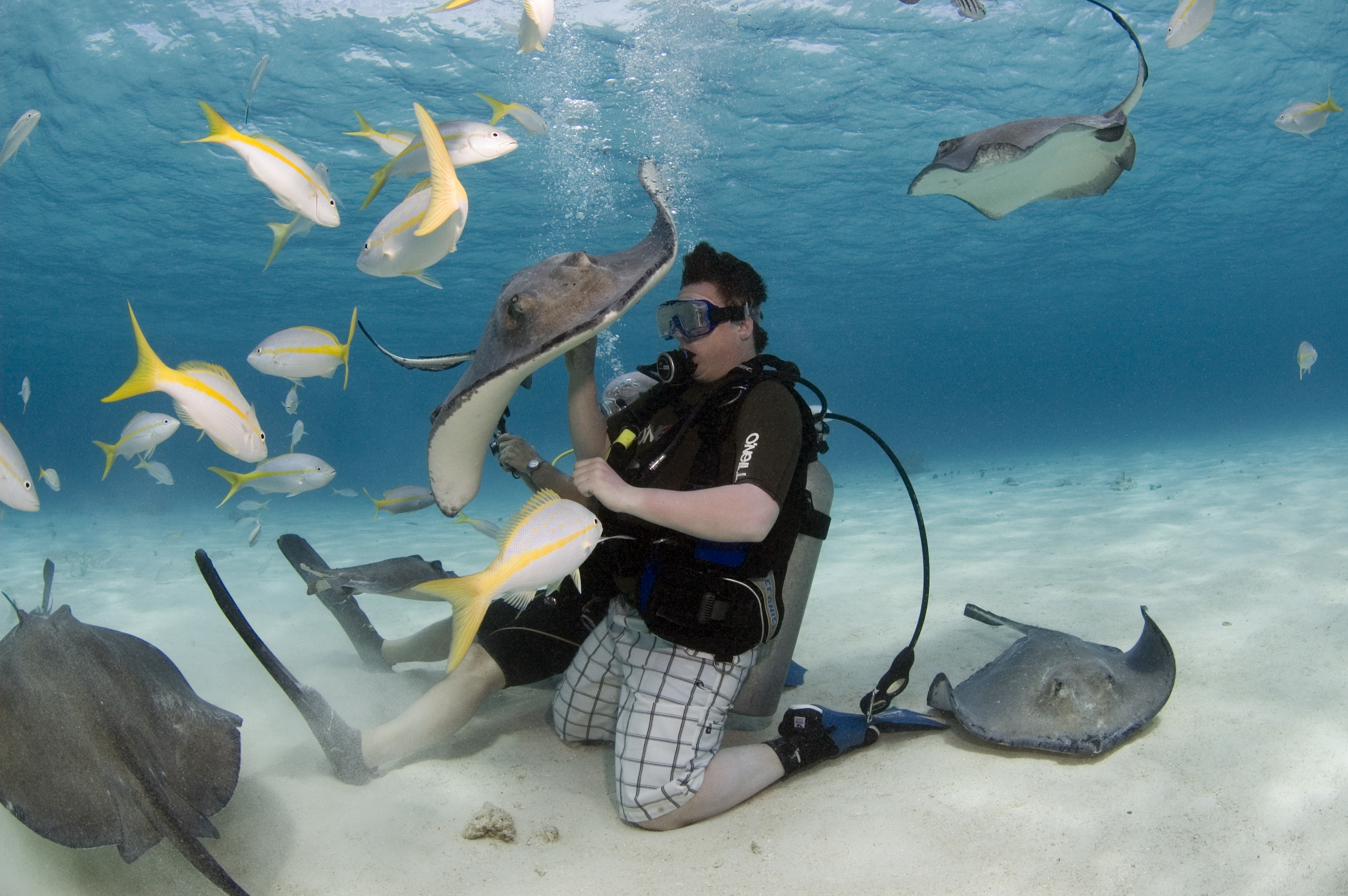
Numerous southern stingrays circling a diver at Grand Cayman

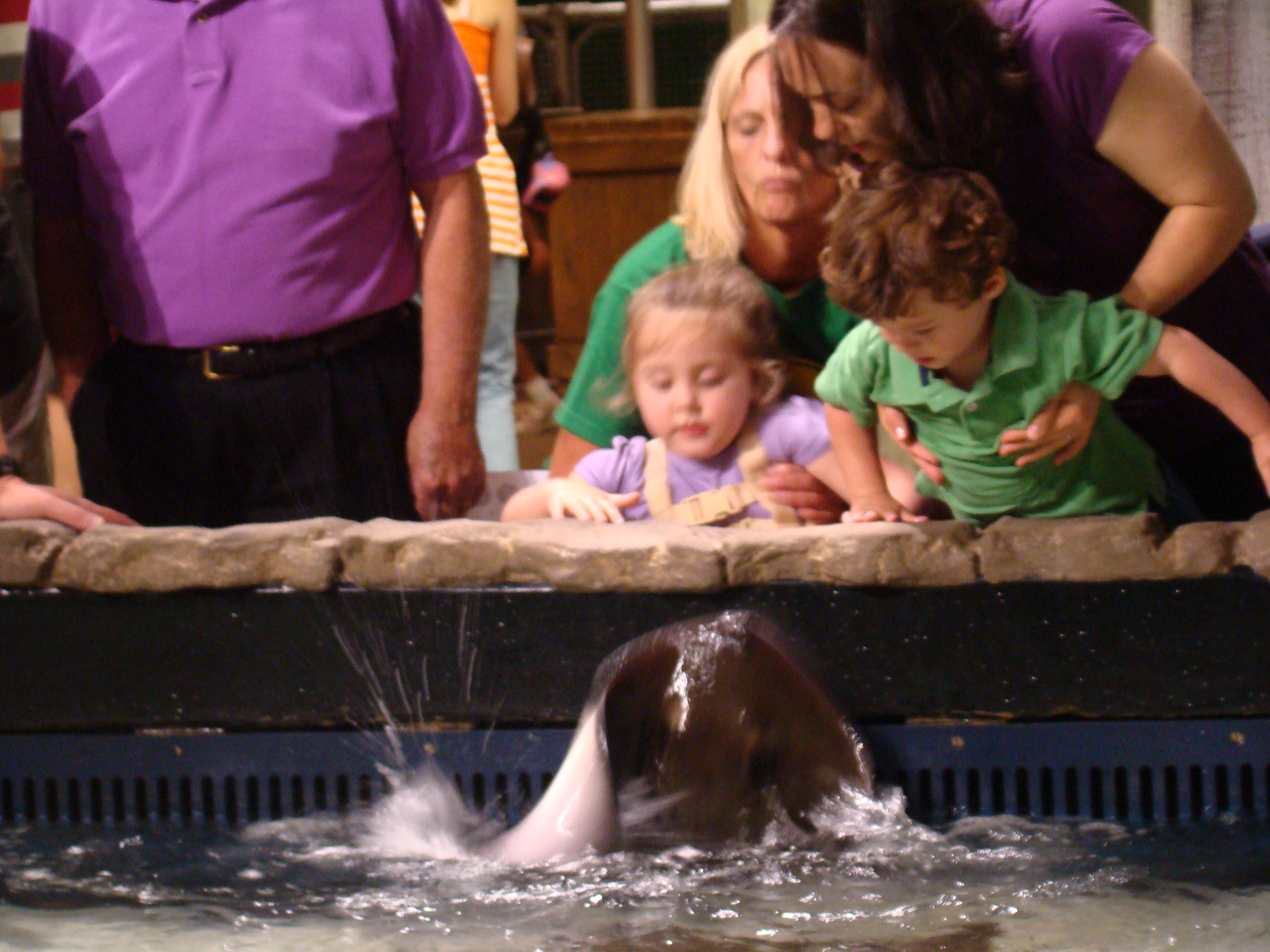
A southern stingray at the touch pool within the Georgia Aquarium's Georgia Explorer exhibit

In many parts of the Caribbean such as Grand Cayman, Cayman Islands and Antigua, the southern stingray swims with divers and snorkelers, and are hand fed at locations such as Stingray City and the Sandbar. On Turks & Caicos, they can be hand fed at a location called Gibbs Cay. Some have become tame enough to be cradled in visitors' arms and feed with pieces of cut up fish. This docile and food-reward driven behavior has led to many locals comparing the hand-fed and belly-rubbed stingray to an over-fed household canine. There are concerns that this feeding, and the high levels of interaction with humans, may be having some negative impacts on their behavior and ecology.

The southern stingray may make its way into the aquarium trade. Despite its relative hardiness, it is best avoided as it requires an immense 4,200 gallon capacity system and will devour any fish or invertebrate it is able to capture. They are also housed within public aquariums and animal theme parks including Six Flags Discovery Kingdom in Vallejo, California and the Long Island Aquarium in Riverhead, New York where visitors are allowed to pet the rays in a touch pool. In public aquariums, female southern stingrays have been seen biting one another on the edges of their fins. Reproduction has also been known to occur within large public aquariums.

== Gallery ==
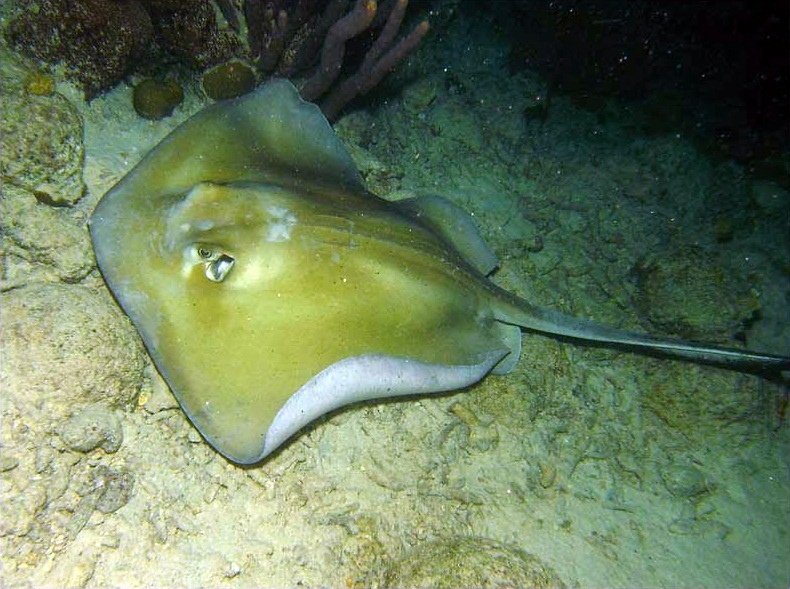
A southern stingray in Bonaire.

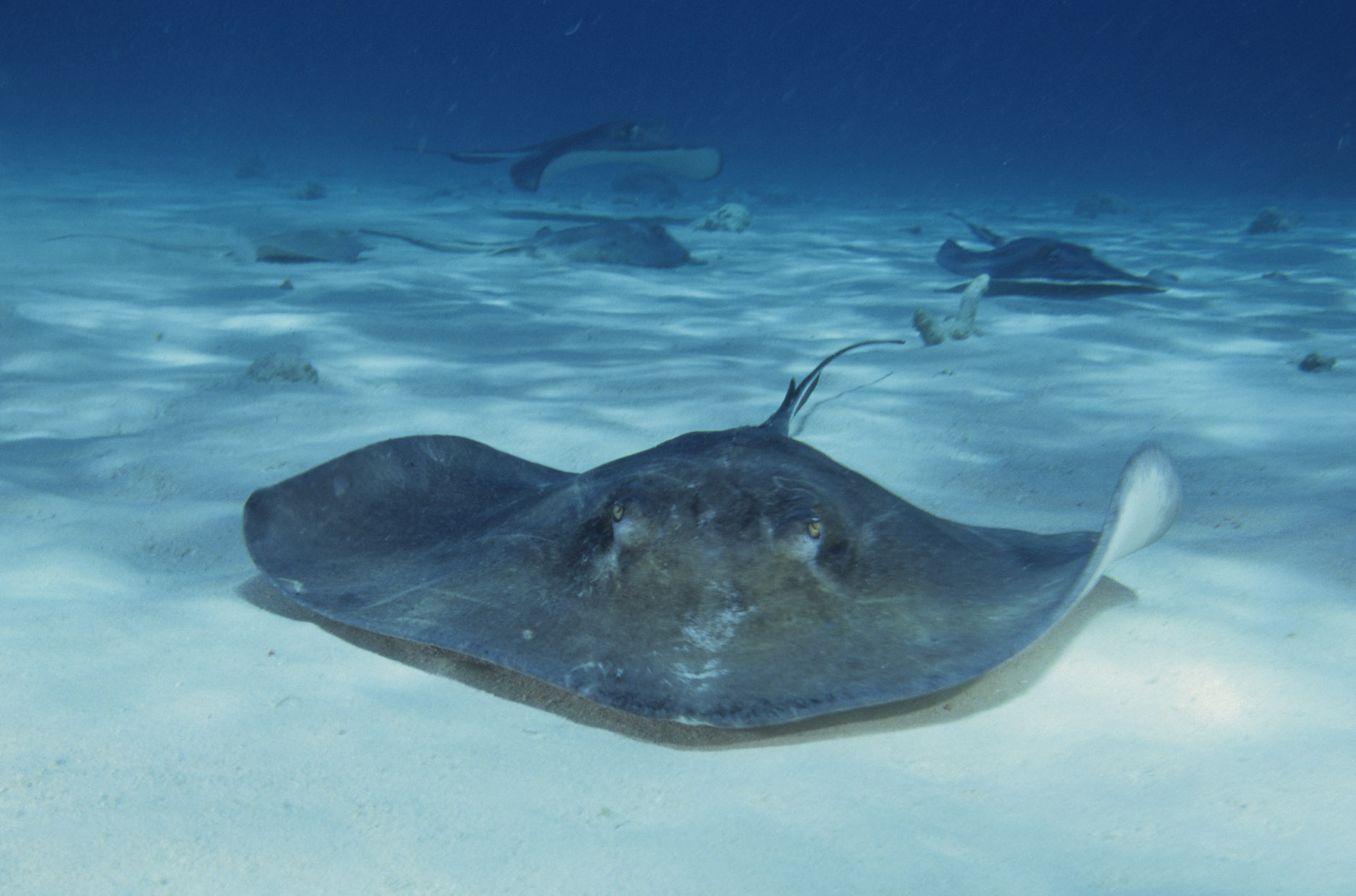
Several southern stingrays swimming around at Grand Cayman.

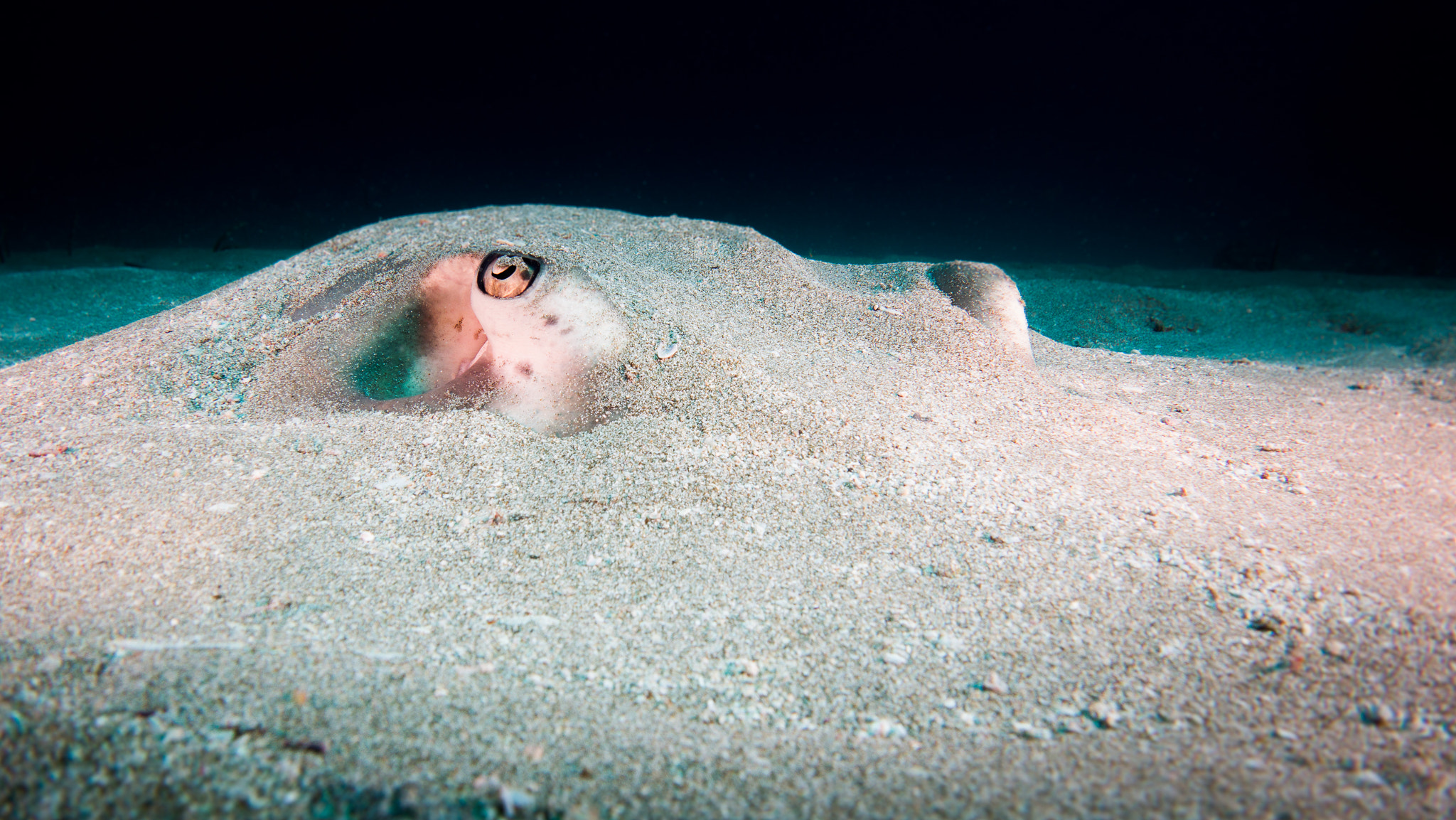
A southern stingray in resting under a layer of sand in Costa Rica.

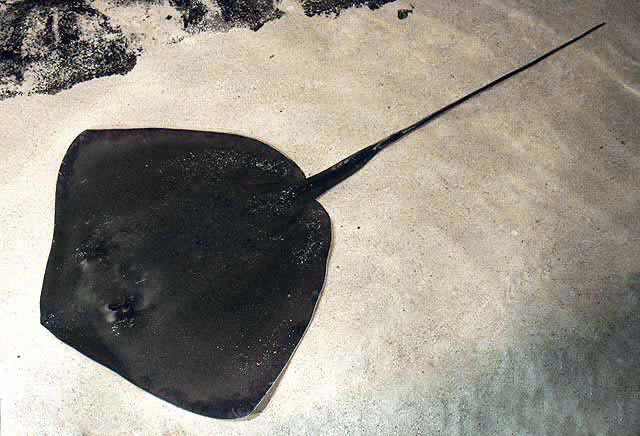
A southern stingray at the Georgia Aquarium in Atlanta, Georgia.

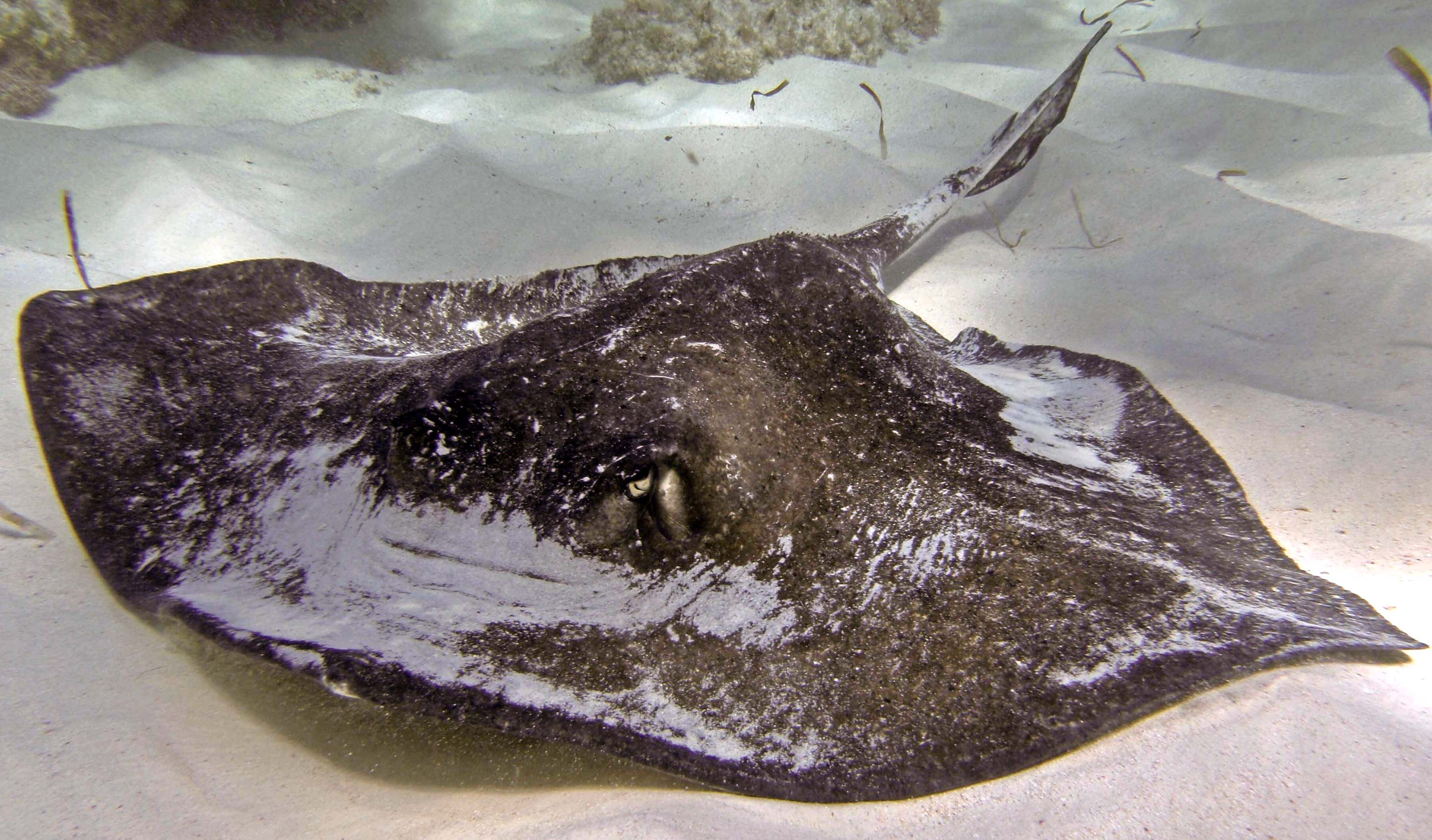
A southern stingray resting near rock outcrops at San Salvador Island.

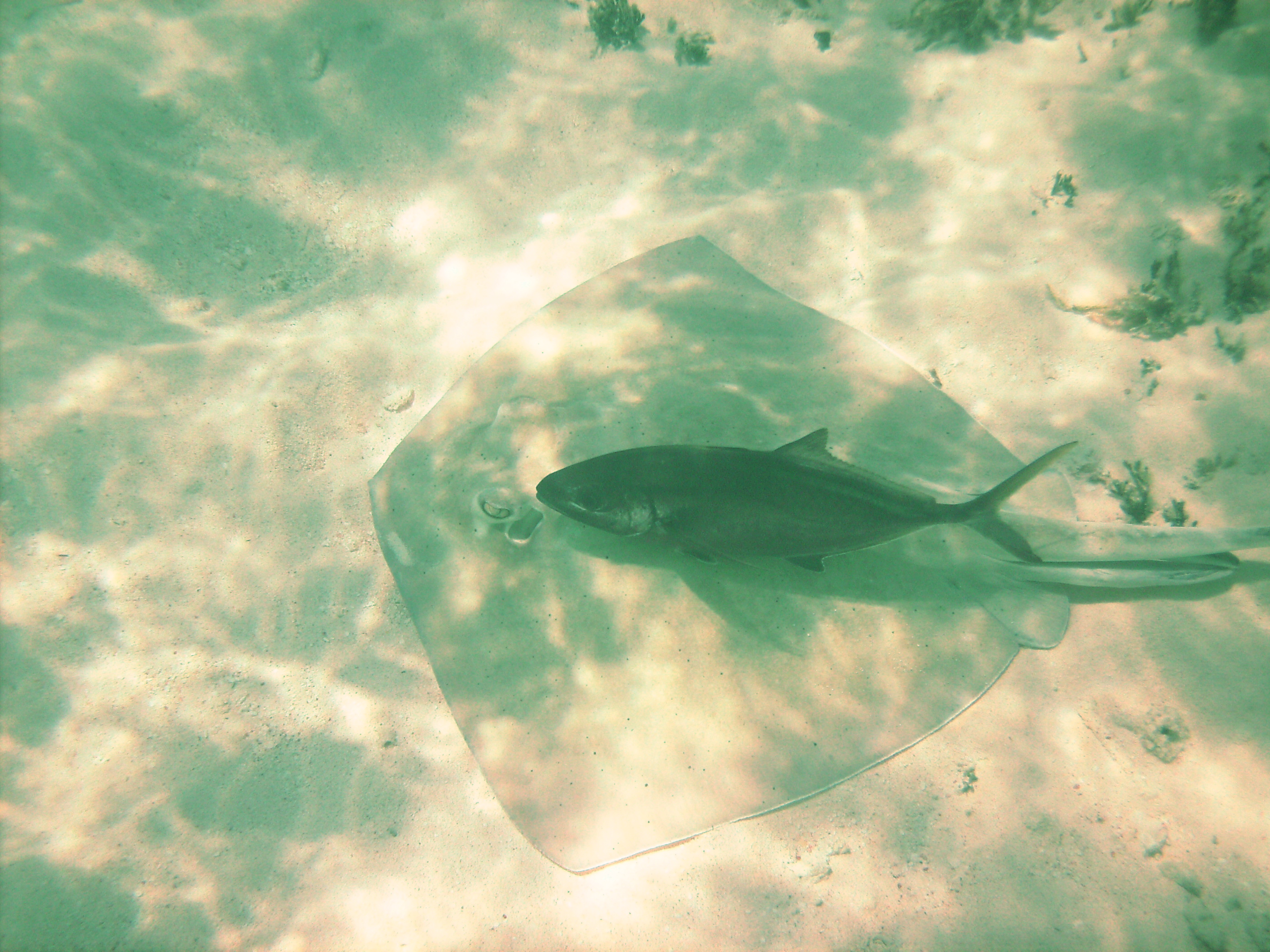
A southern stingray accompanied by a rainbow runner (Elagatis bipinnulata) in Anegada.

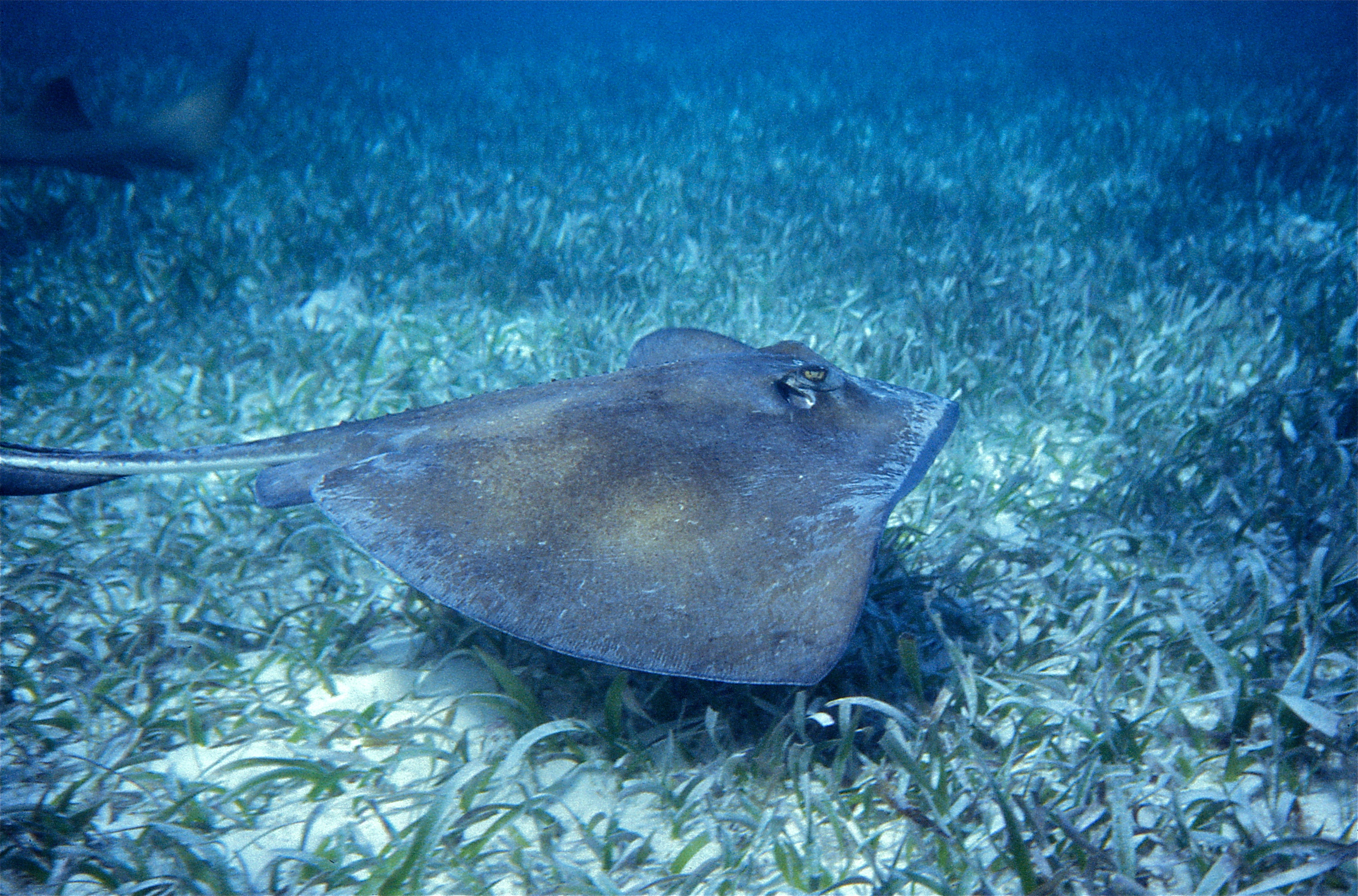
A southern stingray swimming over a meadow of turtle grass (Thalassia testudinum) at Caye Caulker in Belize.

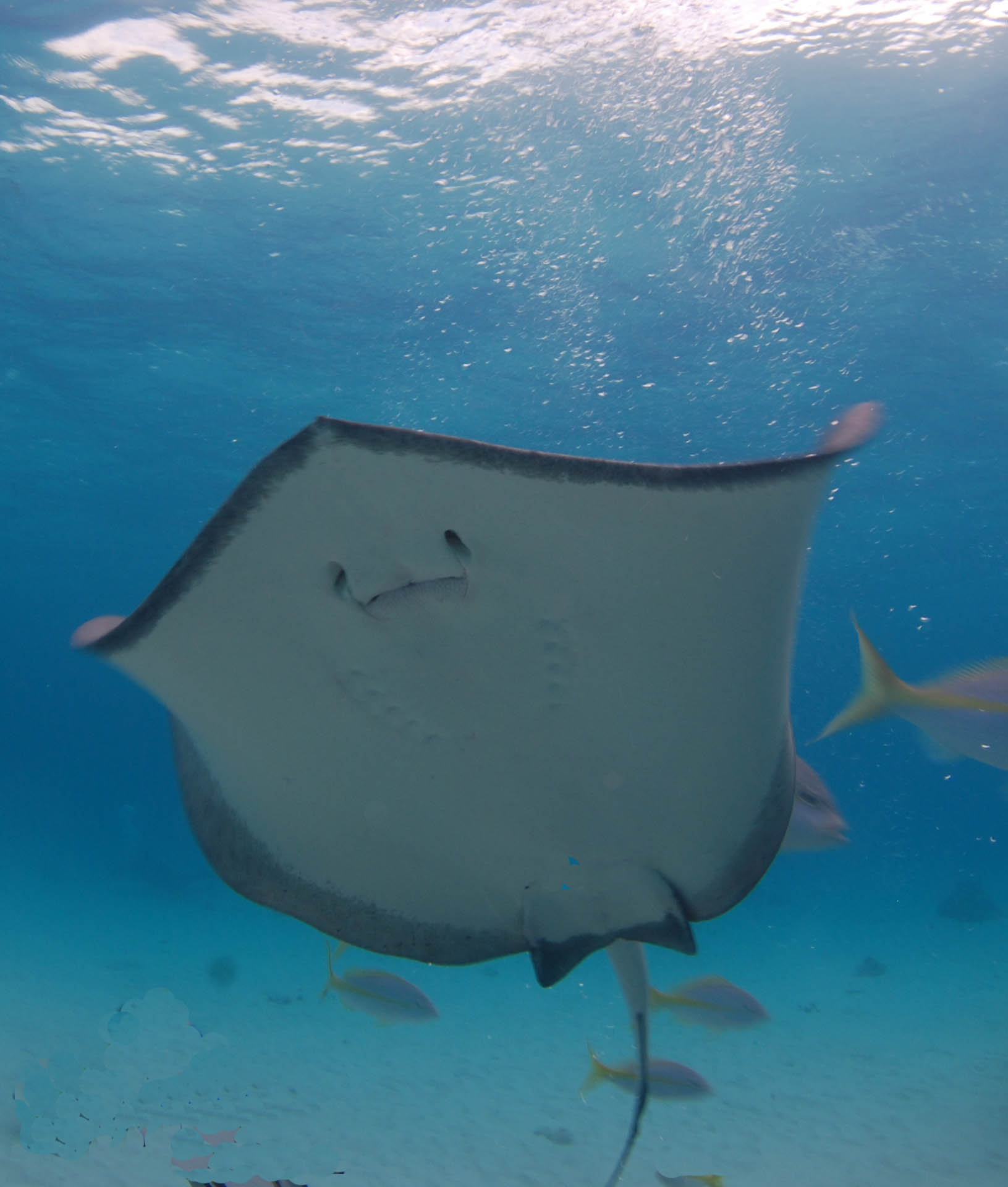
The underside of a southern stingray along with a few yellowtail snapper (Ocyurus chrysurus).
