= Pregnancy (mammals) =

Period of reproduction

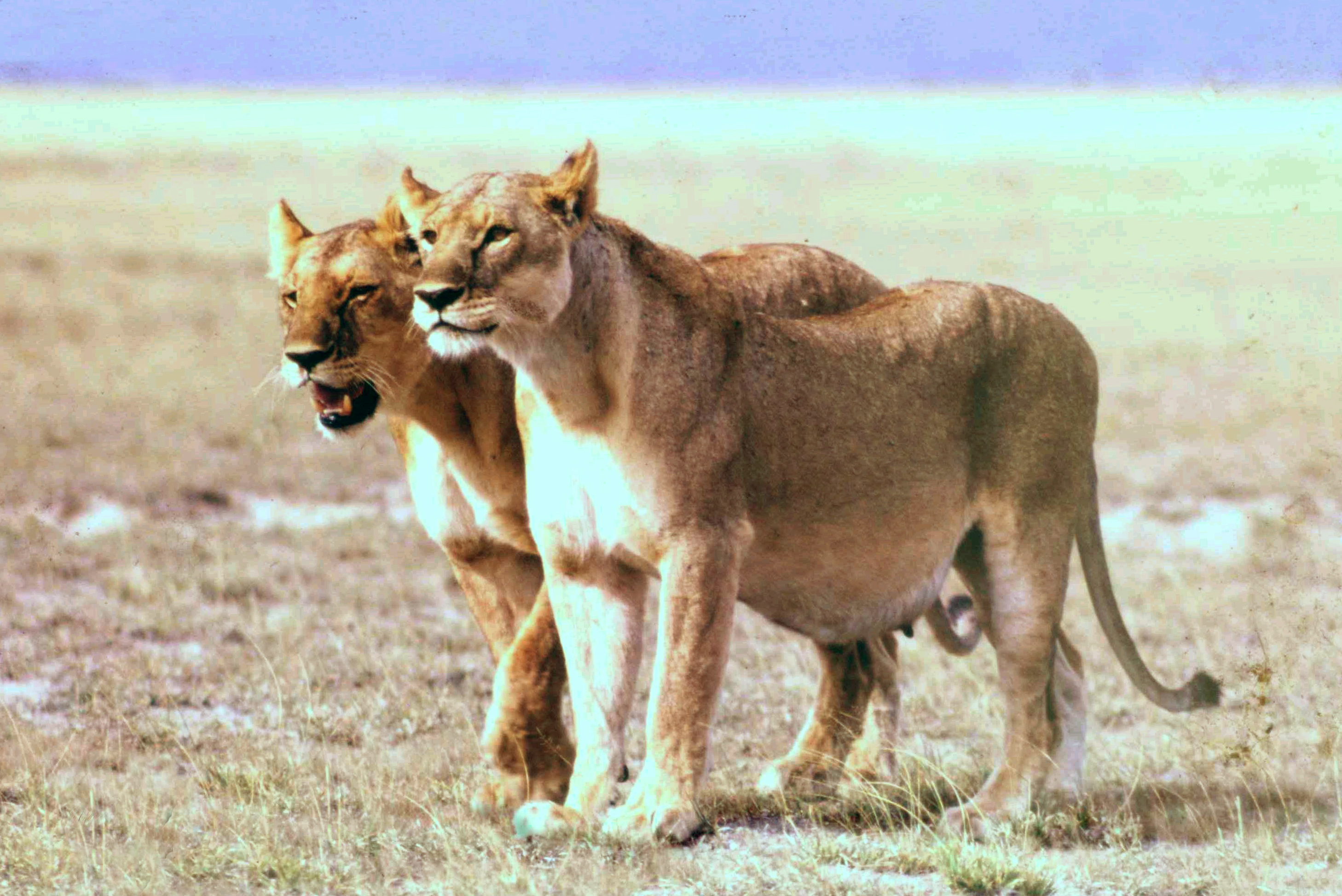
A pregnant lioness.

In therian mammals, pregnancy is the period of reproduction during which a female carries one or more live offspring from implantation in the uterus through gestation. It begins when a fertilized zygote implants in the female's uterus, and ends once it leaves the uterus.

== Fertilization and implantation ==
Male mammals introduce sperm through the penis into the vagina during copulation. The spermatozoon fertilizes an ovum or various ova in the uterus or oviducts, and this results in one or multiple zygotes. Sometimes, a zygote can be created by humans outside of the animal's body in the artificial process of in-vitro fertilization. After fertilization, the newly formed zygote then begins to divide through mitosis, forming an embryo, which implants in the female's endometrium. At this time, the embryo usually consists of 50 cells.

== Development ==
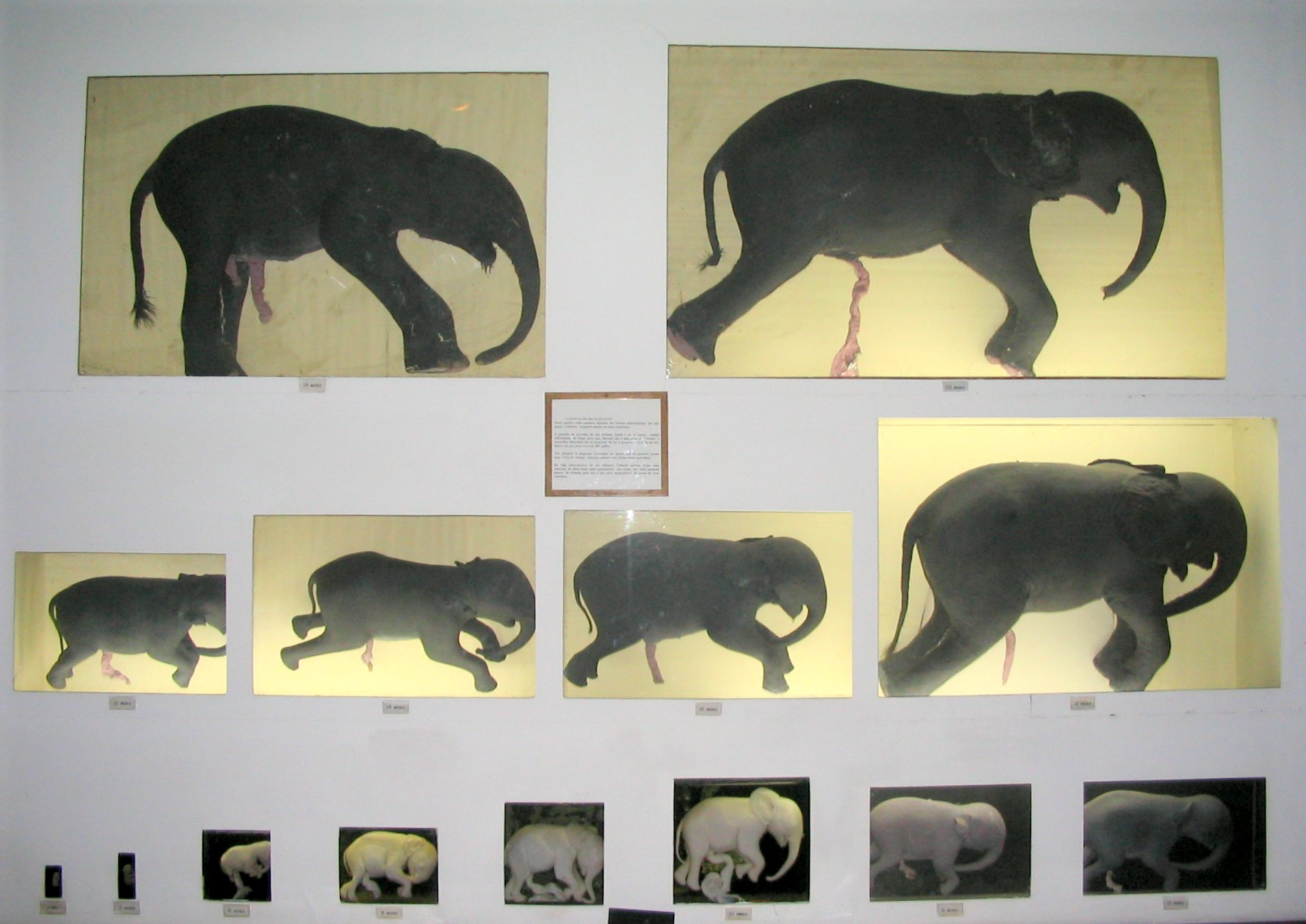
14 fetuses showing stages of embryo development in the African elephant

=== After implantation ===
A blastocele is a small cavity on the center of the embryo, and the developing embryonary cells will grow around it. Then, a flat layer cell forms on the exterior of this cavity, and the zona pellucida, the blastocyst's barrier, remains the same size as before. Cells grow increasingly smaller to fit in. This new structure with a cavity in the center and the developing cells around it is known as a blastocyst.

The presence of the blastocyst means that two types of cells are forming, an inner-cell mass growing on the interior of the blastocele and cells growing on the exterior of it. In 24 to 48 hours, the zona pellucida breaches. The cells on the exterior of the blastocyst begin excreting an enzyme which erodes epithelial uterine lining and creates a site for implantation.

=== Placental circulation system ===
The cells surrounding the blastocyst now destroy cells in the uterine lining, forming small pools of blood, which in turn stimulate the production of capillaries. This is the first stage in the growth of the placenta. The inner cell mass of the blastocyst divides rapidly, forming two layers. The top layer becomes the embryo, and cells from there occupy the amniotic cavity. At the same time, the bottom layer forms a small sac (if the cells begin developing in an abnormal position, an ectopic gestation may also occur at this point).

Several days later, chorionic villi in the forming placenta anchor the implantation site to the uterus. A system of blood and blood vessels now develops at the point of the newly forming placenta, growing near the implantation site. The small sac inside the blastocyst begins producing red blood cells. For the next 24 hours, connective tissue develops between the developing placenta and the growing embryo. This later develops into the umbilical cord.

=== Cellular differentiation ===
Following this, a narrow line of cells appears on the surface on the embryo. Its growth makes the embryo undergo gastrulation, in which the three primary tissue layers of the fetus, the ectoderm, mesoderm, and endoderm, develop. The narrow line of cells begin to form the endoderm and mesoderm. The ectoderm begins to grow rapidly as a result of chemicals being produced by the mesoderm. These three layers give rise to all the various types of tissue in the body.

The endoderm later forms the lining of the tongue, digestive tract, lungs, bladder and several glands. The mesoderm forms muscle, bone, and lymph tissue, as well as the interior of the lungs, heart, and reproductive and excretory systems. It also gives rise to the spleen, and produces blood cells. The ectoderm forms the skin, nails, hair, cornea, lining of the internal and external ear, nose, sinuses, mouth, anus, teeth, pituitary gland, mammary glands, eyes, and all parts of the nervous system.

Approximately 18 days after fertilization, the embryo has divided to form much of the tissue it will need. It is shaped like a pear, where the head region is larger than the tail. The embryo's nervous system is one of the first organic systems to grow. It begins growing in a concave area known as the neural groove.

The blood system continues to grow networks which allow the blood to flow around the embryo. Blood cells are already being produced and are flowing through these developing networks. Secondary blood vessels also begin to develop around the placenta, to supply it with more nutrients. Blood cells begin to form on the sac in the center of the embryo, as well as cells which begin to differentiate into blood vessels. Endocardial cells begin to form the myocardium.

At about 24 days past fertilization, there is a primitive S-shaped tubule heart which begins beating. The flow of fluids throughout the embryo begins at this stage.

=== Gestation periods ===
For mammals, the gestation period is the time in which a fetus develops, beginning with fertilization and ending at birth. The duration of this period varies between species.

For most species, the amount a fetus grows before birth determines the length of the gestation period. Smaller species normally have a shorter gestation period than larger animals. For example, a cat's gestation normally takes 58–65 days while an elephant's takes nearly 2 years (21 months). However, growth does not necessarily determine the length of gestation for all species, especially for those with a breeding season. Species that use a breeding season usually give birth during a specific time of year when food is available.

Various other factors can come into play in determining the duration of gestation. For humans, male fetuses normally gestate several days longer than females and multiple pregnancies gestate for a shorter period. Ethnicity in humans is also a factor that may lengthen or shorten gestation. In dogs, there is a positive correlation between a longer gestation time and fewer members of the litter. The duration of gestation is usually longer in placental mammals than in marsupials.

== See also ==
- Nesting instinct
- Non-human fetuses
- Pseudopregnancy
