= Acanthobothrium zimmeri =

Scientific classification
- Kingdom: Animalia
- Phylum: Platyhelminthes
- Class: Cestoda
- Order: Tetraphyllidea
- Family: Onchobothriidae
- Genus: Acanthobothrium
- Species: A. zimmeri

Binomial name
- Acanthobothrium zimmeri Fyler, Caira & Jensen, 2009

Species of tapeworm

Acanthobothrium zimmeri is a species of tapeworm named after the author Carl Zimmer. A. zimmeri was first described in 2009 based on specimens collected from the Arafura Sea in Australia's Northern Territory. It parasitizes a species of stingray in the genus Himantura. It has also been found to parasite Urogymnus acanthobothrium.
