= Hortle's whipray =

Conservation status
- Near Threatened (IUCN 3.1)

Scientific classification
- Kingdom: Animalia
- Phylum: Chordata
- Class: Chondrichthyes
- Subclass: Elasmobranchii
- Order: Myliobatiformes
- Family: Dasyatidae
- Genus: Pateobatis
- Species: P. hortlei

Binomial name
- Pateobatis hortlei Last, Manjaji-Matsumoto & Kailola, 2006

Species of fish

The Hortle's whipray (Pateobatis hortlei) is a little-known species of stingray in the family Dasyatidae, occurring in shallow estuaries and mud flats off southern New Guinea. This species, growing to 71 cm (28 in) across, has a heart-shaped pectoral fin disc with a long, pointed snout and minute eyes. It has a wide dorsal band of dermal denticles extending from in front of the eyes to the tail, as well as scattered sharp denticles on the snout. The underside of the disc is a distinctive bright yellow in color, sometimes with darker markings around the nostrils, mouth, and gill slits. The Hortle's whipray is threatened by extensive seine fisheries and habitat degradation, leading the International Union for Conservation of Nature (IUCN) to assess it as Near Threatened.

== Taxonomy ==
The Hortle's whipray was named after Kent Hortle, a biological consultant at the Freeport mine in the Indonesian province of Papua, who provided the first photographs and fresh specimens of the ray to biologists. The species was formally described by Peter Last, Mabel Manjaji-Matsumoto, and Patricia Kailola in a 2006 issue of the scientific journal Zootaxa. An adult male 71 cm (28 in) across, collected from the estuary of the Minajerwi River, was designated as the type specimen. This ray belongs to the 'uarnacoides' species complex, along with H. chaophraya, H. granulata, H. lobistoma, H. pastinacoides, and H. uarnacoides.

== Distribution and habitat ==
The Hortle's whipray is found only off southern Papua province, and perhaps also neighboring Papua New Guinea. It inhabits brackish water estuaries and intertidal mud flats, in water no deeper than 10 m (33 ft).

== Description ==
The pectoral fin disc of the Hortle's whipray is heart-shaped and slightly longer than wide; the anterior margins are concave and converge on a highly elongated, narrowly triangular snout. The eyes are tiny and spaced wide apart, and immediately followed by large, teardrop-shaped spiracles. There is a broad, roughly rectangular curtain of skin between the nostrils with a finely fringed posterior margin. The mouth is strongly bow-shaped and does not contain papillae (nipple-shaped structures). The small, blunt teeth are set closely with a quincunx pattern, and stained orange to brown in adults. There are 21–25 upper and 24–28 lower tooth rows. The five pairs of gill slits are distinctively S-shaped.

The pelvic fins are short and broad. The very thin tail measures 2.6–3.4 times as long as the body, and lacks fin folds. One or two stinging tail spines are placed on the upper surface of the tail, about one-third of a disc width back from the tail base. A wide band of flattened dermal denticles, composed of larger heart-shaped denticles and smaller variably-shaped interstitial denticles, runs along the dorsal surface of the disc from before the eyes to the tail. Small, sharp denticles are scattered over the snout and concentrated at the tip. The tail past the sting is uniformly covered by denticles. The lateral line network is well-developed both over and beneath the disc. Smaller rays are plain greenish gray above, while larger rays are yellowish brown; the tail is uniformly brown and lighter in front of the sting. The underside is distinctively bright yellow, with a thin dark border around the disc margin and sometimes darker blotches around the nostrils, mouth, and gill slits. The largest known male is 71 cm (28 in) across, and the largest female 65 cm (26 in) across.

== Biology and ecology ==
Little is known of the natural history of the Hortle's whipray. It is presumed to be a predator of crustaceans, molluscs, and small fishes. Reproduction is aplacental viviparous, with the females supplying their developing embryos with histotroph ("uterine milk"); the young are born at under 20 cm (7.9 in) across.

== Human interactions ==
Beach seine fishers targeting prawns try to avoid the Hortle's whipray, but still take it regularly as bycatch. The meat, and possibly also the skin and cartilage, is utilized. This ray is also threatened by habitat degradation, from the large-scale destruction of mangroves, intensive mining activity, and river pollution. While the Hortle's whipray remains common within its small range, the International Union for Conservation of Nature (IUCN) believes these factors have led to a population decline, and has assessed it as Near Threatened.
