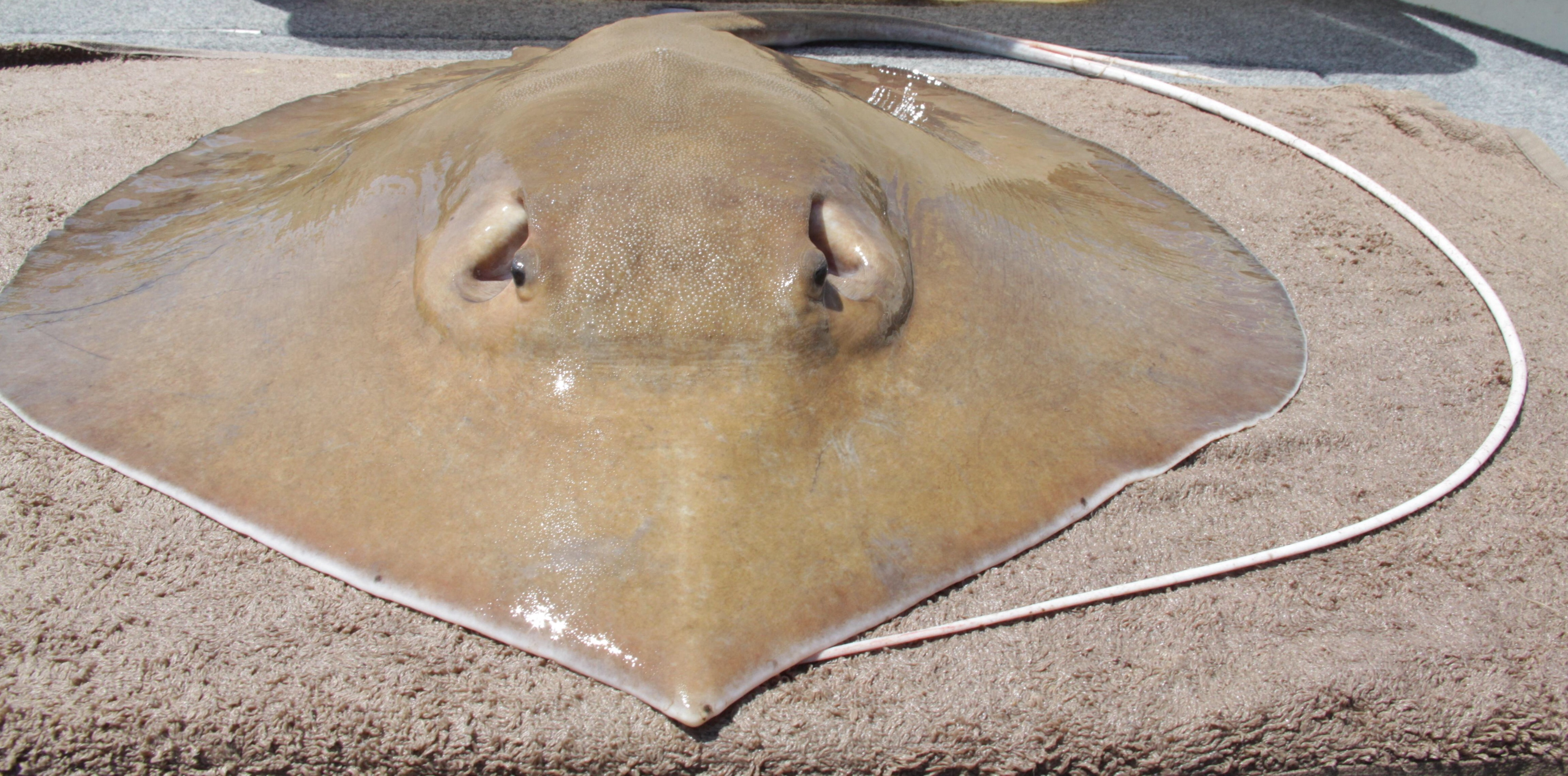

Conservation status
- Data Deficient (IUCN 3.1)

Scientific classification
- Domain: Eukaryota
- Kingdom: Animalia
- Phylum: Chordata
- Class: Chondrichthyes
- Subclass: Elasmobranchii
- Order: Myliobatiformes
- Family: Dasyatidae
- Genus: Urogymnus
- Species: U. acanthobothrium

Binomial name
- Urogymnus acanthobothrium Last, White & Kyne, 2016

= Mumburarr whipray =

Species of fish (stingray)

The mumburarr whipray (Urogymnus acanthobothrium) is a species of whipray from northern Australia and southern Papua New Guinea, described in 2016.

== Discovery ==
The first tissue sample was collected in 1999 by scientists funded by the American National Science Foundation, who were researching fish tapeworms. Further specimens were collected under the (Australian) National Environmental Research Program and by observers from the National Fisheries Authority in Papua New Guinea. It was formally described in 2016.

== Etymology ==
Mumburarr, meaning 'stingray', was chosen to recognise the assistance of native traditional landowowners in locating specimens. It is a term from the Limilngan language used by the Minitja people of the West Alligator River region. The epithet acanthobothrium recognises the role of the parasite project in discovering this whipray. They found four species of Acanthobothrium cestodes unique to this host.

== Description ==
The ray is very large, up to 1.6 m wide. Compared to the related mangrove whipray, Urogymnus granulatus, it has a longer snout and tail, and the snout is more angular. It lacks the white flecks on the upper (dorsal) surface and black margin on the lower (ventral) disc that are seen in the mangrove whipray. Individuals vary from grey-white or grey-brown to yellow-brown above. The holotype specimen was yellow-brown when freshly collected. Unlike other species in the genus, the mumburarr and mangrove whiprays have tails that are uniformly white past the sting, contrasting with their body colour.

== Distribution ==
The species inhabits marine and brackish estuarine waters in northern Australia and southern Papua, at depths of 2 to 60 m. It has been found in the Arafura Sea off the Wessel Islands, in rivers of Kakadu National Park in Northern Territory, in the Cambridge Gulf and Ord River in Western Australia, and in the Gulf of Papua. Its range overlaps that of the porcupine ray, U. asperrimus, and the freshwater whipray, U. dalyensis syn. Himantura dalyensis.
