= Acanthobothrium bullardi =

Scientific classification
- Kingdom: Animalia
- Phylum: Platyhelminthes
- Class: Cestoda
- Order: Tetraphyllidea
- Family: Onchobothriidae
- Genus: Acanthobothrium
- Species: A. bullardi

Binomial name
- Acanthobothrium bullardi Ghoshroy & Caira, 2001

Species of tapeworm

Acanthobothrium bullardi is a species of parasitic onchobothriid tapeworm first found in the whiptail stingray, Dasyatis brevis, in the Gulf of California. This species of parasitic tapeworm was originally discovered alongside four other varieties of tapeworms in the Gulf of California during a survey of the area that was done in the years 1993 as well as 1996.
