= Acanthobothrium rajivi =

Scientific classification
- Kingdom: Animalia
- Phylum: Platyhelminthes
- Class: Cestoda
- Order: Tetraphyllidea
- Family: Onchobothriidae
- Genus: Acanthobothrium
- Species: A. rajivi

Binomial name
- Acanthobothrium rajivi Ghoshroy & Caira, 2001

Species of tapeworm

Acanthobothrium rajivi is a species of parasitic onchobothriid tapeworm first found in the whiptail stingray, Dasyatis brevis, in the Gulf of California. It is relatively small, possesses few segments, relatively few testes, and shows asymmetrical ovaries. It also differs from its cogenerate species by its hook size and length of its hook prongs; cirrus sac size; the position of its genital pore, the number of testes columns that are anterior to the cirrus sac; as well as a number of postvaginal testes.
