= Acanthobothrium soberoni =

Scientific classification
- Kingdom: Animalia
- Phylum: Platyhelminthes
- Class: Cestoda
- Order: Tetraphyllidea
- Family: Onchobothriidae
- Genus: Acanthobothrium
- Species: A. soberoni

Binomial name
- Acanthobothrium soberoni Ghoshroy & Caira, 2001

Species of tapeworm

Acanthobothrium soberoni is a species of parasitic onchobothriid tapeworm first found in the whiptail stingray, Dasyatis brevis, in the Gulf of California. It is relatively long and with a larger number of segments, albeit with fewer testes and an asymmetrical ovary. It also differs from its cogenerate species by its hook size and length of its hook prongs; cirrus sac size; the position of its genital pore, the number of testes columns that are anterior to the cirrus sac; as well as a number of postvaginal testes.
