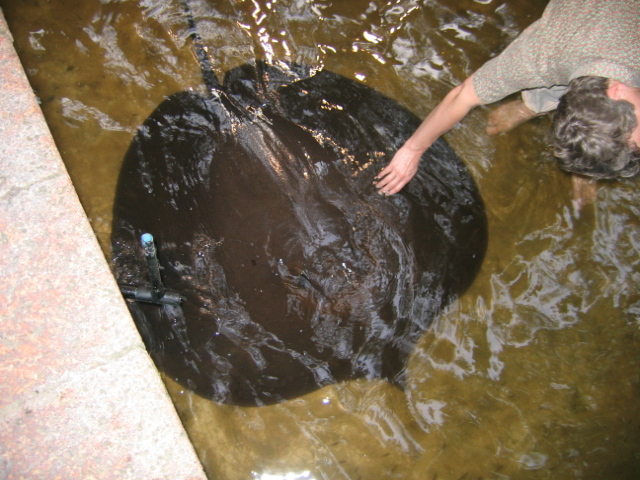

Conservation status
- Endangered (IUCN 3.1)

Scientific classification
- Kingdom: Animalia
- Phylum: Chordata
- Class: Chondrichthyes
- Subclass: Elasmobranchii
- Order: Myliobatiformes
- Family: Dasyatidae
- Genus: Urogymnus
- Species: U. polylepis

Binomial name
- Urogymnus polylepis (Bleeker, 1852)
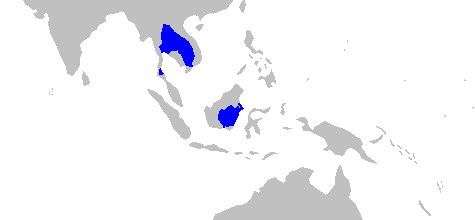
- Geographic range (excludes populations not confirmed as extant and/or conspecific)

Synonyms
- Himantura chaophraya Monkolprasit & Roberts, 1990; Trygon polylepis Bleeker, 1852; Himantura polylepsis (Bleeker, 1852)

= Giant freshwater stingray =

Giant freshwater stingray Temporal range: Pleistocene–Recent

Species of cartilaginous fish

The giant freshwater stingray (Urogymnus polylepis, also widely known by the junior synonym Himantura chaophraya) is a species of stingray in the family Dasyatidae. It is found in large rivers and estuaries in Southeast Asia and Borneo, though historically it may have been more widely distributed in South and Southeast Asia. The widest freshwater fish in the world, this species grows up to 2.2 m (7.2 ft) across and can exceed 300 kg (660 lb) in weight. It has a relatively thin, oval pectoral fin disc that is widest anteriorly, and a sharply pointed snout with a protruding tip. Its tail is thin and whip-like, and lacks fin folds. This species is uniformly grayish brown above and white below; the underside of the pectoral and pelvic fins bear distinctive wide, dark bands on their posterior margins.

Bottom-dwelling in nature, the giant freshwater stingray inhabits sandy or muddy areas and preys on small fishes and invertebrates. Females give live birth to litters of one to four pups, which are sustained to term by maternally produced histotroph ("uterine milk"). This species faces heavy fishing pressure for meat, recreation, and aquarium display, as well as extensive habitat degradation and fragmentation. These forces have resulted in substantial population declines in at least central Thailand and Cambodia. As a result, the International Union for Conservation of Nature (IUCN) has assessed the giant freshwater stingray as Endangered.

== Taxonomy and phylogeny ==
The first scientific description of the giant freshwater stingray was authored by Dutch ichthyologist Pieter Bleeker in an 1852 volume of the journal Verhandelingen van het Bataviaasch Genootschap van Kunsten en Wetenschappen. His account was based on a juvenile specimen 30 cm (12 in) across, collected from Jakarta, Indonesia. Bleeker named the new species polylepis, from the Greek poly ("many") and lepis ("scales"), and assigned it to the genus Trygon (now a synonym of Dasyatis). However, in subsequent years Bleeker's description was largely overlooked, and in 1990 the giant freshwater stingray was described again by Supap Monkolprasit and Tyson Roberts in an issue of the Japanese Journal of Ichthyology. They gave it the name Himantura chaophraya, which came into widespread usage. In 2008, Peter Last and B. Mabel Manjaji-Matsumoto confirmed that T. polylepis and H. chaophraya refer to the same species, and since Bleeker's name was published earlier, the scientific name of the giant freshwater stingray became Himantura polylepis. This species may also be called the giant freshwater whipray, giant stingray, or freshwater whipray.

There is a complex of similar freshwater and estuarine stingrays in South Asia, Southeast Asia, and Australasia that are or were tentatively identified with U. polylepis. The Australian freshwater Urogymnus were described as a separate species, Urogymnus dalyensis, in 2008. The freshwater Urogymnus in New Guinea are probably U. dalyensis rather than U. polylepis, though confirmation awaits further study. Trygon fluviatilis from India, as described by Nelson Annandale in 1909, closely resembles and may be conspecific with U. polylepis. On the other hand, comparison of freshwater whipray DNA and amino acid sequences between India and Thailand has revealed significant differences. Finally, additional research is needed to assess the degree of divergence amongst populations of U. polylepis inhabiting various drainage basins across its distribution, so as to determine whether further taxonomic differentiation is warranted.

In terms of the broader evolutionary relationships between the giant freshwater whipray and the rest of the family Dasyatidae, a 2012 phylogenetic analysis based on mitochondrial DNA reported that it was most closely related to the porcupine ray (Urogymnus asperrimus), and that they in turn formed a clade with the mangrove whipray (U. granulatus) and the tubemouth whipray (U. lobistoma). This finding adds to a growing consensus that the genus Himantura sensu lato is paraphyletic.

Fossil caudal spines have been attributed to this species from late middle Pleistocene deposits in the Madura Strait and possibly older Pleistocene deposits from Trinil in eastern Java.

== Description ==
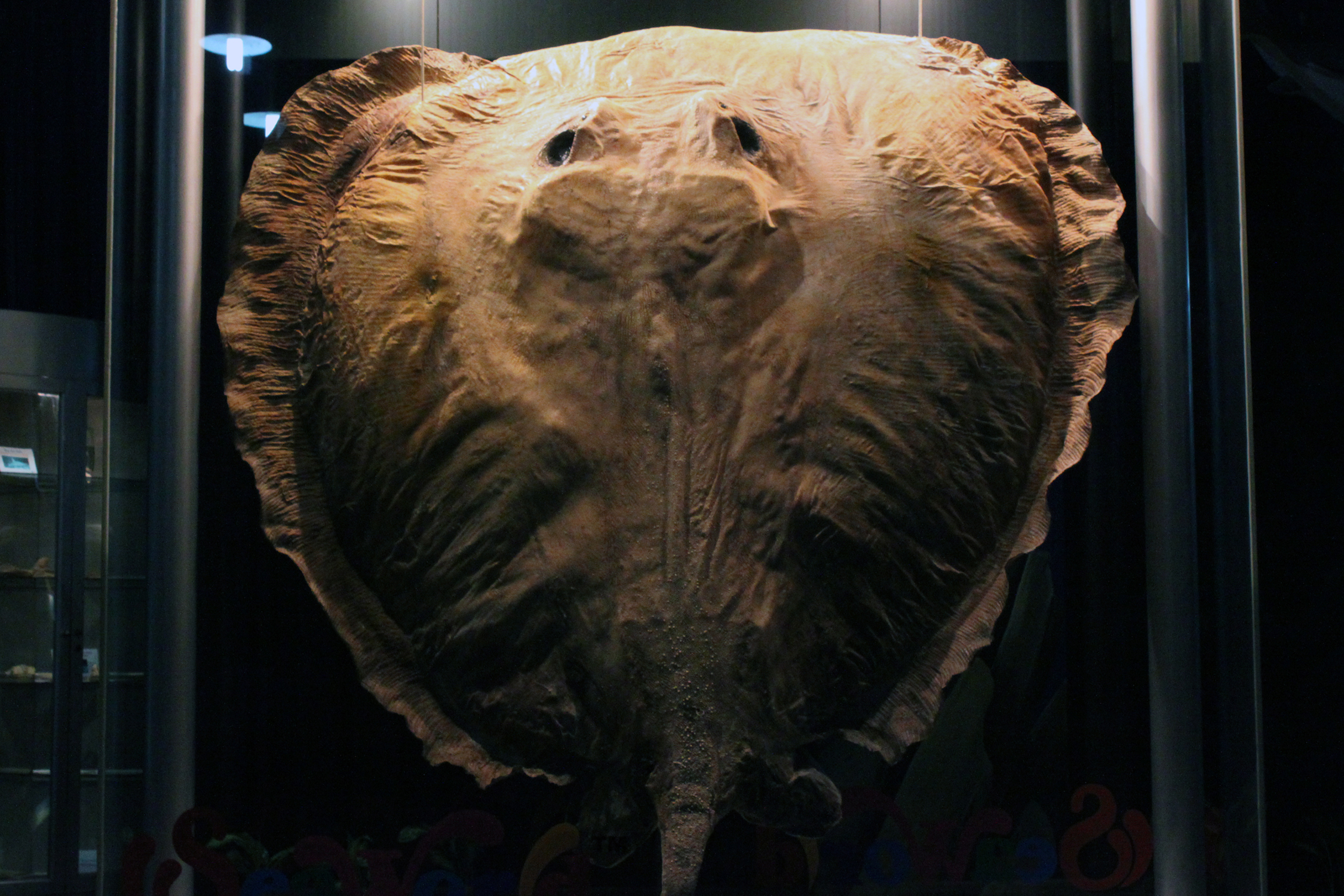
Preserved giant freshwater stingray, showing the characteristic shape of its disc.

The giant freshwater stingray has a thin, oval pectoral fin disc slightly longer than wide and broadest towards the front. The elongated snout has a wide base and a sharply pointed tip that projects beyond the disc. The eyes are minute and widely spaced; behind them are large spiracles. Between the nostrils is a short curtain of skin with a finely fringed posterior margin. The small mouth forms a gentle arch and contains four to seven papillae (two to four large at the center and one to four small to the sides) on the floor. The small and rounded teeth are arranged into pavement-like bands. There are five pairs of gill slits on the ventral side of the disc. The pelvic fins are small and thin; mature males have relatively large claspers.

The thin, cylindrical tail measures 1.8–2.5 times as long as the disc and lacks fin folds. A single serrated stinging spine is positioned on the upper surface of the tail near the base. At up to 38 cm (15 in) long, the spine is the largest of any stingray species. There is band of heart-shaped tubercles on the upper surface of the disc extending from before the eyes to the base of the sting; there is also a midline row of four to six enlarged tubercles at the center of the disc. The remainder of the disc upper surface is covered by tiny granular denticles, and the tail is covered with sharp prickles past the sting. This species is plain grayish brown above, often with a yellowish or pinkish tint towards the fin margins; in life the skin is coated with a layer of dark brown mucus. The underside is white with broad dark bands, edged with small spots, on the trailing margins of the pectoral and pelvic fins. The tail is black behind the spine. The giant freshwater stingray reaches at least 1.9 m (6.2 ft) in width and 5.0 m (16.4 ft) in length, and can likely grow larger (It is not impossible that length is even 10 m (33 ft), and width is 5 m (16 ft)). With reports from the Mekong and Chao Phraya Rivers of individuals weighing 500–600 kg (1,100–1,300 lb), but it is not impossible, that it is 1,500 kg (3,300 lb), or even 2,000 kg (4,400 lb) - it ranks among the largest freshwater fishes in the world.

In June 2022, it was reported that a specimen caught in the Mekong river had broken the record for the largest strict freshwater fish ever documented (the largest sturgeon species can far exceed this size, but they are anadromous). The individual weighed 661 lb (300 kg), and was measured at 3.98 m (13.1 ft) long and 2.2 m (7.2 ft) wide.

== Distribution and habitat ==
The giant freshwater stingray is known to inhabit several large rivers and associated estuaries in Indochina and Borneo. In Indochina, it occurs in the Mekong River to potentially as far upstream as Chiang Khong in Thailand, as well as in the Chao Phraya, Nan, Mae Klong, Bang Pakong, and Tapi Rivers, also found in Bueng Boraphet but now completely extinct. In Borneo, this species is found in the Mahakam River in Kalimantan and the Kinabatangan and Buket Rivers in Sabah; it is reportedly common in the Kinabatangan River but infrequently caught. Though it has been reported from Sarawak as well, surveys within the past 25 years have not found it there. Elsewhere in the region, recent river surveys in Java have not recorded its presence, despite the island being the locality of the species holotype.

Historical records from the Ganges River in India, and the Bay of Bengal as Trygon fluviatilis are possibly Himantura fluviatilis, although it has been confirmed as being present in the Kaladan and Mayu rivers in Myanmar in 2022.

Disjunct populations of the giant freshwater stingray in separate river drainages are probably isolated from one another; though the species occurs in brackish environments, there is no evidence that it crosses marine waters. This is a bottom-dwelling species that favors a sandy or muddy habitat. Unexpectedly, it can sometimes be found near heavily populated urban areas.

== Biology and ecology ==
The diet of the giant freshwater stingray consists of small, benthic fishes and invertebrates such as crustaceans and molluscs, which it can detect using its electroreceptive ampullae of Lorenzini. Individuals can often be seen at the edge of the river, possibly feeding on earthworms. Parasites documented from this species include the tapeworms Acanthobothrium asnihae, A. etini, A. masnihae, A. saliki, A. zainali, Rhinebothrium abaiensis, R. kinabatanganensis, and R. megacanthophallus. The giant freshwater stingray is viviparous, with the developing embryos nourished initially by yolk and later by histotroph ("uterine milk") provided by the mother. This species does not appear to be diadromous (migrating between fresh and salt water to complete its life cycle). Observed litter sizes range from one to four pups; newborns measure around 30 cm (12 in) across. Pregnant females are frequently found in estuaries, which may serve as nursery areas. Males mature sexually at approximately 1.1 m (3.6 ft) across; female maturation size and other life history details are unknown.

== Human interactions ==
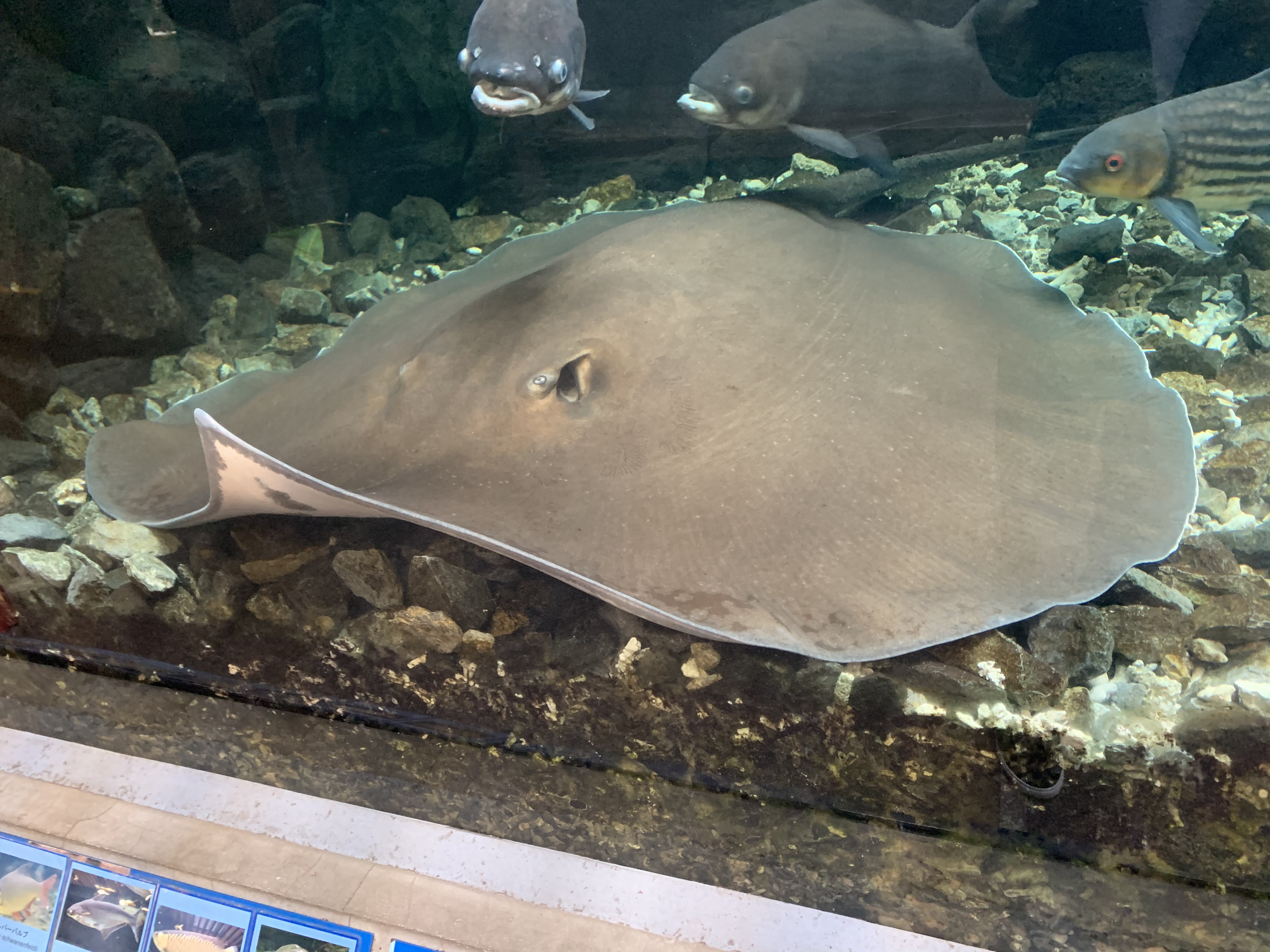
Stingrays on display at the aquarium

The giant freshwater stingray is not aggressive, but its sting is sheathed in toxic mucus and is capable of piercing bone. Across its range, this species is caught incidentally by artisanal fishers using longlines, and to a lesser extent gillnets and fish traps. It is reputedly difficult and time-consuming to catch; a hooked ray may bury itself under large quantities of mud, becoming almost impossible to lift, or drag boats over substantial distances or underwater. The meat and the cartilage are used; large specimens are cut into kilogram pieces for sale. Adults that are not used for food are often killed or maimed by fishers nonetheless. In the Mae Klong and Bang Pakong Rivers, the giant freshwater stingray is also increasingly targeted by sport fishers and for display in public aquariums. These trends pose conservation concerns; the former because catch and release is not universally practised and the post-release survival rate is unknown, the latter because this species does not survive well in captivity. In Myanmar, these stingrays were lured with heated iron chains, as fishers viewed it as attracting them.

The major threats to the giant freshwater stingray are overfishing and habitat degradation resulting from deforestation, land development, and damming. The construction of dams also fragments the population, reducing genetic diversity and increasing the susceptibility of the resulting subpopulations to extinction. Due to its low reproductive rate, the giant freshwater stingray is not resilient to anthropogenic pressures. In central Thailand and Cambodia, the population is estimated to have been reduced by 30–50% over the past 20–30 years, with declines as severe as 95% in some locations. The size of rays caught has decreased significantly as well; for example, in Cambodia the average weight of a landed ray has dropped from 23.2 kg (51 lb) in 1980 to 6.9 kg (15 lb) in 2006. The status of populations in other areas, such as Borneo, is largely unknown. As a result of documented declines, the International Union for Conservation of Nature (IUCN) has assessed this species as Endangered overall, and as Critically Endangered in Thailand. In the 1990s, the Thai government initiated a captive breeding program at Chai Nat to bolster the population of this and other freshwater stingray species until the issue of habitat degradation can be remedied. However, by 1996 the program had been put on hold.
