= Tubemouth whipray =

Conservation status
- Endangered (IUCN 3.1)

Scientific classification
- Kingdom: Animalia
- Phylum: Chordata
- Class: Chondrichthyes
- Subclass: Elasmobranchii
- Order: Myliobatiformes
- Family: Dasyatidae
- Genus: Urogymnus
- Species: U. lobistoma

Binomial name
- Urogymnus lobistoma (Manjaji-Matsumoto & Last, 2006)

Synonyms
- Himantura lobistoma Manjaji-Matsumoto & Last, 2006

Species of cartilaginous fish

The tubemouth whipray (Urogymnus lobistoma) is a little-known species of stingray in the family Dasyatidae, named for its distinctive, highly protrusible jaws. It is found in shallow, brackish water near mangrove forests and large river mouths along the coasts of southwestern Borneo and southern Sumatra. Measuring up to 1 m (3.3 ft) across, this species has a diamond-shaped pectoral fin disc with an elongated, pointed snout and broadly rounded outer corners. The upper surface of the disc is a plain grayish or brownish in color, and covered by small, flattened dermal denticles. The tubemouth whipray is relatively common at present, but is heavily pressured by habitat degradation and coastal fisheries. The International Union for Conservation of Nature (IUCN) has listed it as Endangered.

== Taxonomy ==
The first known specimens of the tubemouth whipray were caught from the South China Sea in 1999, and initially thought to be Dasyatis microphthalmus, a species of dubious taxonomic validity. As additional specimens emerged, this ray was described as a new species by B. Mabel Manjaji-Matsumoto and Peter Last in a 2006 issue of the scientific journal Ichthyological Research. The specific epithet lobistoma is derived from the Latin lobus ("protuberance") and stoma ("mouth"), in reference to its protrusible jaws. The type specimen is an adult male 49 cm (19 in) across, collected off Bintulu in Sarawak, Malaysia. The tubemouth whipray was thought to belong to the 'uarnacoides' species complex, along with U. polylepsis, Mangrove whipray, H. hortlei, H. pastinacoides, and H. uarnacoides. It is however placed in the genus Urogymnus.

== Distribution and habitat ==
The tubemouth whipray has only been found in the South China Sea off southern Sumatra and southwestern Borneo, to as far north as Bintulu. It is associated with the runoff from large rivers and mangrove forests, occurring in brackish water under 30 m (98 ft) deep over muddy bottoms.

== Description ==
The tubemouth whipray has a diamond-shaped pectoral fin disc longer than wide, with broadly rounded outer corners. The anterior margins of the disc are strongly concave, and converge on a narrow, flattened, pointed snout. The eyes are tiny, and followed by much larger, teardrop-shaped spiracles. The nostrils are small, with a narrow, nearly rectangular flap of skin between them. The mouth is straight and transverse, and contains no papillae (nipple-like structures). The jaws are highly protrusible, capable of forming a tube longer than the mouth width; this trait is unique within the 'uarnacoides' complex. There are 29–34 upper and 31–36 lower tooth rows; the teeth are small, conical, and blunt, and densely arranged into pavement-like surfaces. There is no sexual dimorphism in tooth shape.

The pelvic fins are short and can be rotated forwards; the males have short, stout claspers. The slender tail measures over twice the length of the disc and lacks fin folds. A single stinging spine is found on the upper surface of the tail near the base, but is frequently missing in adults. The upper surface of the disc and tail are covered by minute, blunt dermal denticles, with slightly larger plate-like denticles forming a distinct, broad band extending from before the eyes to the base of the tail; this denticle band is present at birth. There are also 1–5 enlarged, oval denticles in a row between the "shoulders". This species is uniform grayish to light brown above, with the eyes and spiracles rimmed in white, and uniform white below. Females grow up to 1 m (3.3 ft) across, while males are smaller.

== Biology and ecology ==
The diet of the tubemouth whipray likely consists of crustaceans and small fishes. Like other stingrays, it is aplacental viviparous with the developing embryos nourished by maternally produced histotroph ("uterine milk"). One known specimen contained a single near-term pup measuring 18 cm (7.1 in) across. Males attain sexual maturity at under 49 cm (19 in) across, and females at under 70 cm (28 in) across.

== Human interactions ==
The tubemouth whipray remains fairly common within its restricted range, particularly off Sarawak. However, its population has likely declined significantly over the past few decades due to extensive degradation of its mangrove habitat, and intense, unregulated coastal trawl and bottom longline fisheries that take it for meat. As a result, the International Union for Conservation of Nature (IUCN) has assessed this species as Endangered.
