= Phyllobothriidea =

Scientific classification
- Kingdom: Animalia
- Phylum: Platyhelminthes
- Class: Cestoda
- Order: Phyllobothriidea

Order of flatworms

Phyllobothriidea is an order of flatworms belonging to the class Cestoda.

== Taxonomy ==
Families:

- Chimaerocestidae
- Phyllobothriidae

Genera:

- Alexandercestus Ruhnke & Workman, 2013
- Bibursibothrium McKenzie & Caira, 1998
- Bilocularia Obersteiner, 1914
- Calyptrobothrium Monticelli, 1893
- Cardiobothrium McKenzie & Caira, 1998
- Chimaerocestos Williams & Bray, 1984
- Clistobothrium Dailey & Vogelbein, 1990
- Crossobothrium Linton, 1889
- Flexibothrium McKenzie & Caira, 1998
- Guidus Ivanov, 2006
- Hemipristicola Cutmore, Theiss, Bennett & Cribb, 2011
- Monorygma Diesing, 1863
- Orygmatobothrium Diesing, 1863
- Pelichnibothrium Monticelli, 1889
- Phyllobothrium Van Beneden, 1850
- Rockacestus gen. nov. - Parasitises skates
- Ruhnkebothrium gen. nov. - Parasitises hammerhead sharks
- Scyphophyllidium Woodland, 1927
- Trilocularia Olsson, 1867
- Thysanocephalum Linton, 1890
- Yamaguticestus gen. nov. - Parasitises small squaliform sharks and catsharks
