= Calliobothrium =

Scientific classification
- Kingdom: Animalia
- Phylum: Platyhelminthes
- Class: Cestoda
- Order: Tetraphyllidea
- Family: Calliobothriidae
- Genus: Calliobothrium; Van Beneden, 1850

Synonyms
- Calliobothrum Braun, 1894

Genus of flatworms

Calliobothrium is a genus of cestodes in the order Tetraphyllidea. Most, or possibly all, of the known species are parasites found within the intestines of members of the shark family Triakidae. It is known that in some instances at least two different species of Calliobothrium can parasitise the same species of shark.

== Species ==
- Calliobothrium australis Ostrowski de Nunez, 1973
- Calliobothrium cisloi Bernot & Caira, 2017
- Calliobothrium corollatum Monticelli, 1887
- Calliobothrium creeveyae Butler, 1987
- Calliobothrium euzeti Bernot, Caira & Pickering, 2015
- Calliobothrium nodosum Yoshida, 1917
- Calliobothrium shirozame Kurashima, Shimizu, Mano, Ogawa & Fujita, 2014
- Calliobothrium tylotocephalum Alexander, 1963
- Calliobothrium verticillatum (Rudolphi, 1819)
- Calliobothrium whitemanorum Bernot & Caira, 2017
