= Phyllobothriidae =

Scientific classification
- Kingdom: Animalia
- Phylum: Platyhelminthes
- Class: Cestoda
- Order: Tetraphyllidea
- Family: Phyllobothriidae

Family of worms

Phyllobothriidae is a family of flatworms belonging to the order Phyllobothriidea. The phylogeny and classification of these cestodes is not a matter of consensus. As an example, the genus Anthobothrium is classified as a member of the Tetraphyllidea incertae sedis by WoRMS (2026).

== Genera ==
Genera:

- Alexandercestus Ruhnke & Workman, 2013
- Anindobothrium
- Anthobothrium Van Beneden, 1850
