= Chimaerocestidae =

Scientific classification
- Kingdom: Animalia
- Phylum: Platyhelminthes
- Class: Cestoda
- Order: Tetraphyllidea
- Family: Chimaerocestidae

Family of flatworms

Chimaerocestidae is a family of flatworms belonging to the order Tetraphyllidea. The family consists of only one genus: Chimaerocestos Williams & Bray, 1984.
