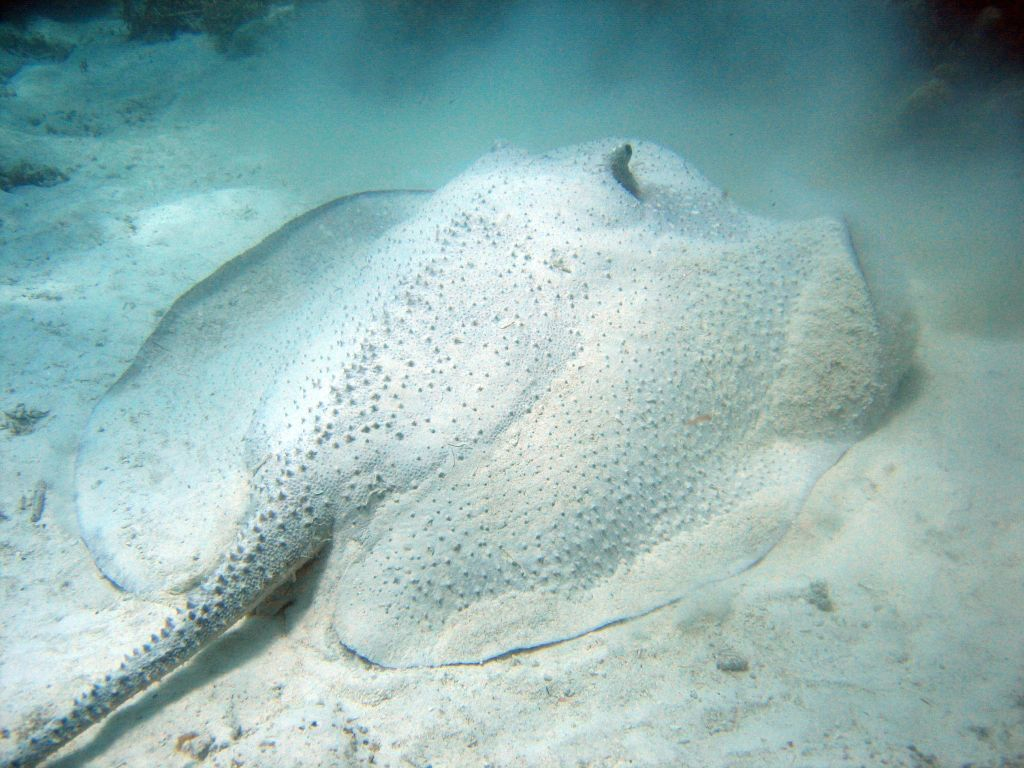
- U. asperrimus

Scientific classification
- Kingdom: Animalia
- Phylum: Chordata
- Class: Chondrichthyes
- Subclass: Elasmobranchii
- Order: Myliobatiformes
- Family: Dasyatidae
- Subfamily: Urogymninae
- Genus: Urogymnus; J. P. Müller & Henle, 1837

Type species
- Raja asperrima Bloch & Schneider, 1801

Synonyms
- Gymnura Müller & Henle, 1837; Rhachinotus Cantor, 1849

= Urogymnus =

Genus of cartilaginous fishes

Urogymnus is a genus of stingrays in the family Dasyatidae from marine, brackish and freshwater habitats in the Indo-Pacific and tropical East Atlantic regions. The genus was previously considered to be monotypic, containing only the porcupine ray (U. asperrimus). Molecular phylogenetic research published in 2016 reassigned several species from Himantura to Urogymnus.

== Species ==
Data from

- Urogymnus acanthobothrium Last, White & Kyne, 2016 (Mumburarr whipray)
- Urogymnus asperrimus (Bloch & J. G. Schneider, 1801) (Porcupine ray)
- Urogymnus dalyensis (Last & Manjaji-Matsumoto, 2008) (Freshwater whipray)
- Urogymnus granulatus (Macleay, 1883) (Mangrove whipray)
- Urogymnus lobistoma Manjaji-Matsumoto & Last, 2006) (Tubemouth whipray)
- Urogymnus polylepis (Bleeker, 1852) (Giant freshwater stingray)

Species brought into synonymy

- Urogymnus africana: synonym of Urogymnus asperrimus
- Urogymnus africanus: synonym of Urogymnus asperrimus
- Urogymnus natalensis: synonym of Gymnura natalensis
- Urogymnus poecilura: synonym of Gymnura poecilura
- Urogymnus rhombeus: synonym of Urogymnus asperrimus
- Urogymnus ukpam: synonym of Fontitrygon ukpam
