= Calliobothriidae =

Scientific classification
- Kingdom: Animalia
- Phylum: Platyhelminthes
- Class: Cestoda
- Order: Tetraphyllidea
- Family: Calliobothriidae; Perrier, 1897

Genera
- Biloculuncus Nasin, Caira & Euzet, 1997; Calliobothrium Van Beneden, 1850; Erudituncus Healy, Scholz & Caira, 2001; Symcallio Bernot, Caira & Pickering, 2015

Family of flatworms

Calliobothriidae is a family of cestodes in the order Tetraphyllidea.
