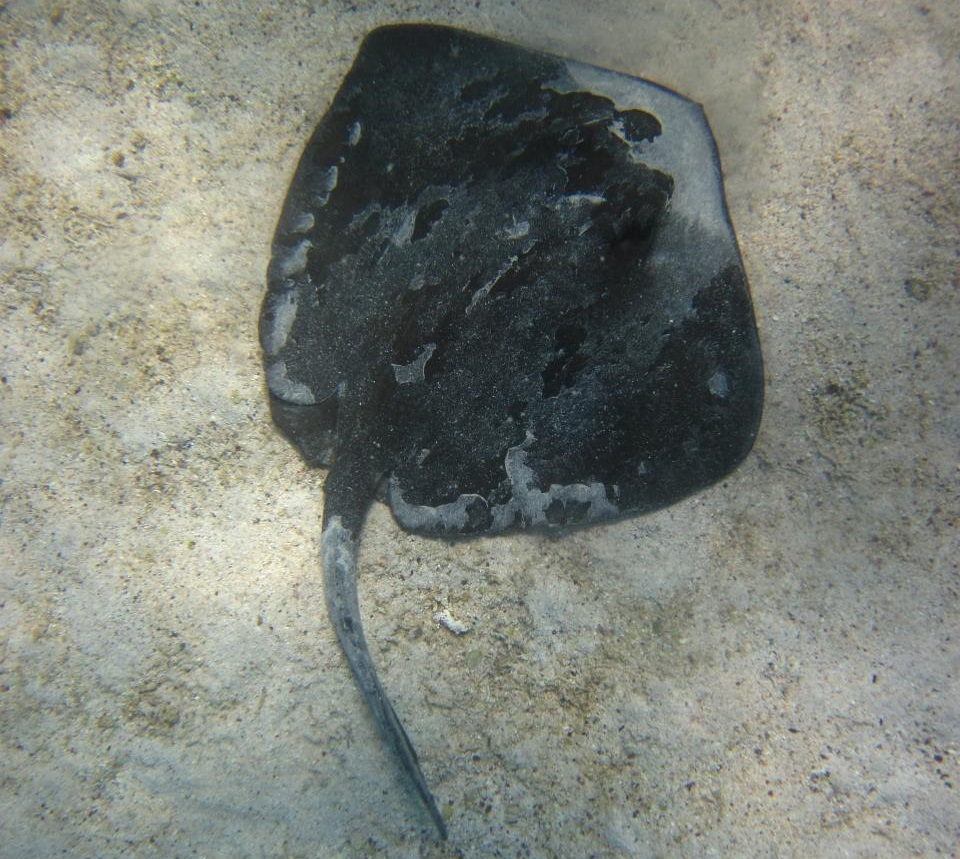

Conservation status
- Vulnerable (IUCN 3.1)

Scientific classification
- Kingdom: Animalia
- Phylum: Chordata
- Class: Chondrichthyes
- Subclass: Elasmobranchii
- Order: Myliobatiformes
- Family: Dasyatidae
- Subfamily: Dasyatinae
- Genus: Hypanus
- Species: H. dipterurus

Binomial name
- Hypanus dipterurus (D. S. Jordan & C. H. Gilbert, 1880)
- Range of the diamond stingray

Synonyms
- Dasyatis dipterura (Jordan & Gilbert, 1880); Dasyatis hawaiensis Jenkins, 1903; Dasybatis dipterura Jordan & Gilbert, 1880

= Diamond stingray =

Species of cartilaginous fish

The diamond stingray (Hypanus dipterurus) is a species of stingray in the family Dasyatidae. It is found in the coastal waters of the eastern Pacific Ocean from southern California to northern Chile, and around the Galápagos and Hawaiian Islands. This bottom-dweller generally inhabits sandy or muddy flats near rocky reefs and kelp forests, to a depth of 30 m (98 ft), though off Hawaii it may range considerably deeper. As its common name suggests, this species has an angular, diamond-shaped pectoral fin disc that is plain brown or gray above, with rows of tubercles along the midline and on the "shoulders". The long, whip-like tail has both dorsal and ventral fin folds, which distinguish this ray from the closely similar longtail stingray (H. longa). It typically grows to 1 m (3.3 ft) across.

When searching for food, diamond stingrays may form groups of up to hundreds of individuals. It is most active at night and preys mainly on burrowing invertebrates and small bony fishes, which are extracted from the bottom via suction or digging. This species is aplacental viviparous: once the embryos exhaust their yolk supply, they are nourished by histotroph ("uterine milk") produced by the mother. Females bear 1–4 pups every summer in estuaries; mating is followed by a ten-month period of either sperm storage or arrested embryonic development, after which the embryos rapidly mature over 2–3 months. The slowest-growing stingray known, this species is not resilient against fishing pressure. It is caught for food by artisanal fishers in Latin America, particularly in Mexico where it is one of the most economically important rays. This is assessed as Vulnerable by the International Union for Conservation of Nature (IUCN). Though innocuous towards humans, the diamond stingray's long, venomous tail spine is potentially dangerous.

== Taxonomy and phylogeny ==
In 1880, the diamond stingray was described twice by three American ichthyologists: as Dasybatus dipterurus by David Starr Jordan and Charles Henry Gilbert in Proceedings of the United States National Museum, and as Trygon brevis by Samuel Garman in Bulletin of the Museum of Comparative Zoology. Jordan and Gilbert's account was published in May while Garman's was published in October, making dipterurus (feminine dipterura) the correct name as it was published first. However, when Garman synonymized the two in 1913 he inappropriately gave precedence to brevis, leading to long-standing confusion. Both Dasybatus and Trygon were later synonymized with the genus Dasyatis, but many authors still listed D. brevis in place of or in addition to D. dipterura. Garman also synonymized the Hawaiian stingray (D. hawaiensis) with D. dipterura in 1913, which has since been followed by most authors but requires more study for confirmation.

The species syntypes were collected from San Diego Bay, California. The specific epithet dipterura is derived from the Latin di ("two"), ptero ("wing"), and ura ("tail"), referring to the fin folds on both sides of its tail. Rat-tailed stingray is a former common name for this species. Lisa Rosenberger's 2001 phylogenetic analysis, based on morphology, determined the diamond stingray and the bluntnose stingray (H. say) of the western Atlantic Ocean to be sister species, that likely diverged before or with the formation of the Isthmus of Panama (c. 3 Ma). In addition, the two were found to be the second-most basal taxa in their genus, after the common stingray (Dasyatis pastinaca).

== Distribution and habitat ==
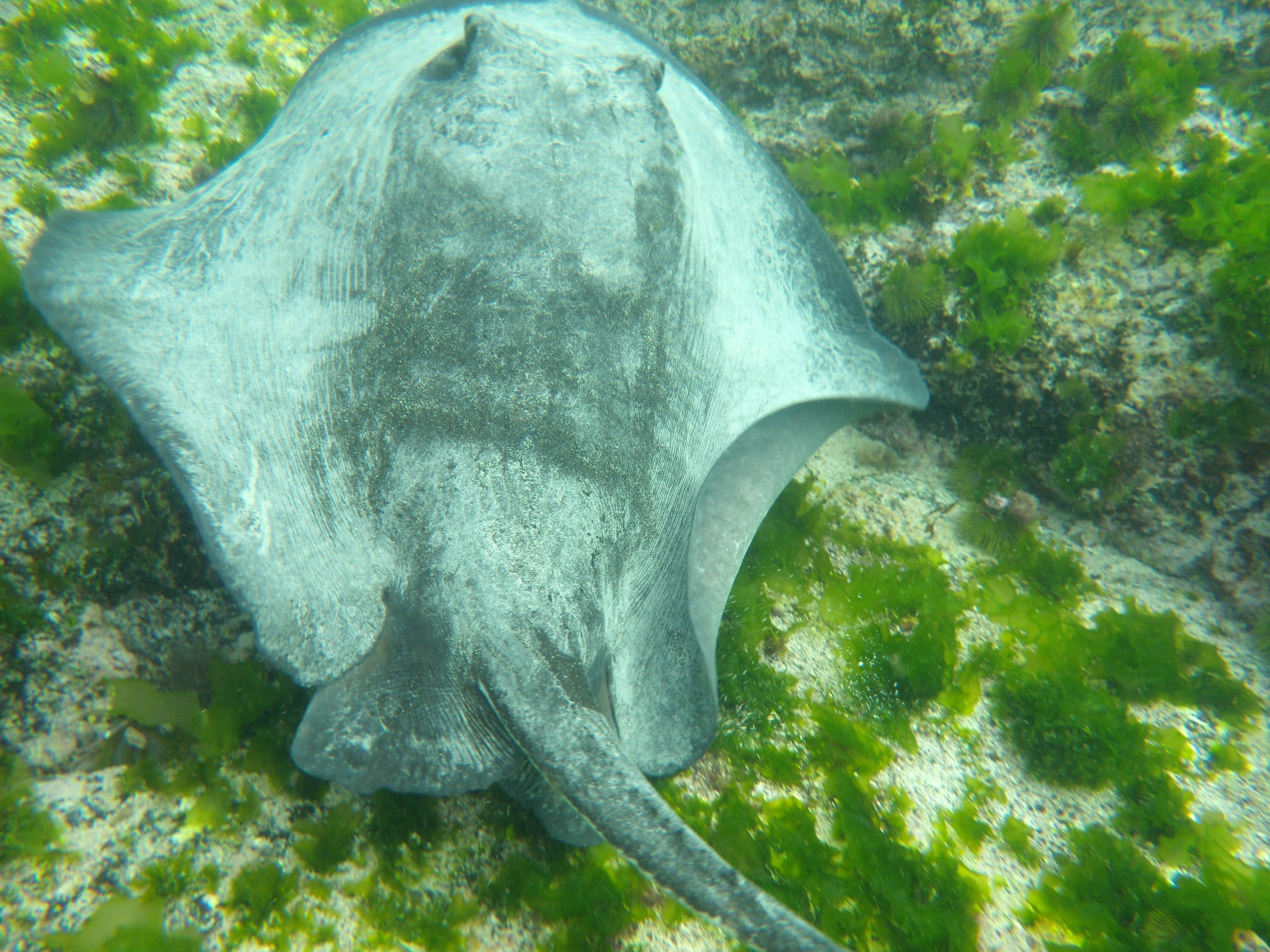
During the summer, the diamond stingray is common in the shallows off beaches.

The diamond stingray is found in the eastern Pacific Ocean from southern California to northern Chile, as well as around the Galápagos and Hawaiian Islands; it is very abundant around Baja California and in the Gulf of California. At the northern and southern extremes of its range, it is generally only present during periods of suitably warm water brought about by El Niño. There is a record of this ray from off British Columbia, which is unconfirmed and would be highly anomalous as it is known to be a tropical and warm-temperate species.

A bottom-dwelling inhabitant of inshore waters, the diamond stingray favors sandy or muddy bottoms, often near rocky reefs or kelp forests. Off southern California, it usually occurs from the intertidal zone to a depth of 7 m (23 ft) during the summer, shifting to depths of 13–18 m (43–59 ft) during late fall and winter. For unknown reasons, it prefers to overwinter in kelp forests rather than sandy flats. Off Chile, the diamond stingray occurs at a similar depth of 3–30 m (10–100 ft). On the other hand, this species has been reported from as far down as 355 m (1,165 ft) off Hawaii, which if accurate would suggest that it utilizes a much greater range of depths than previously realized.

== Description ==
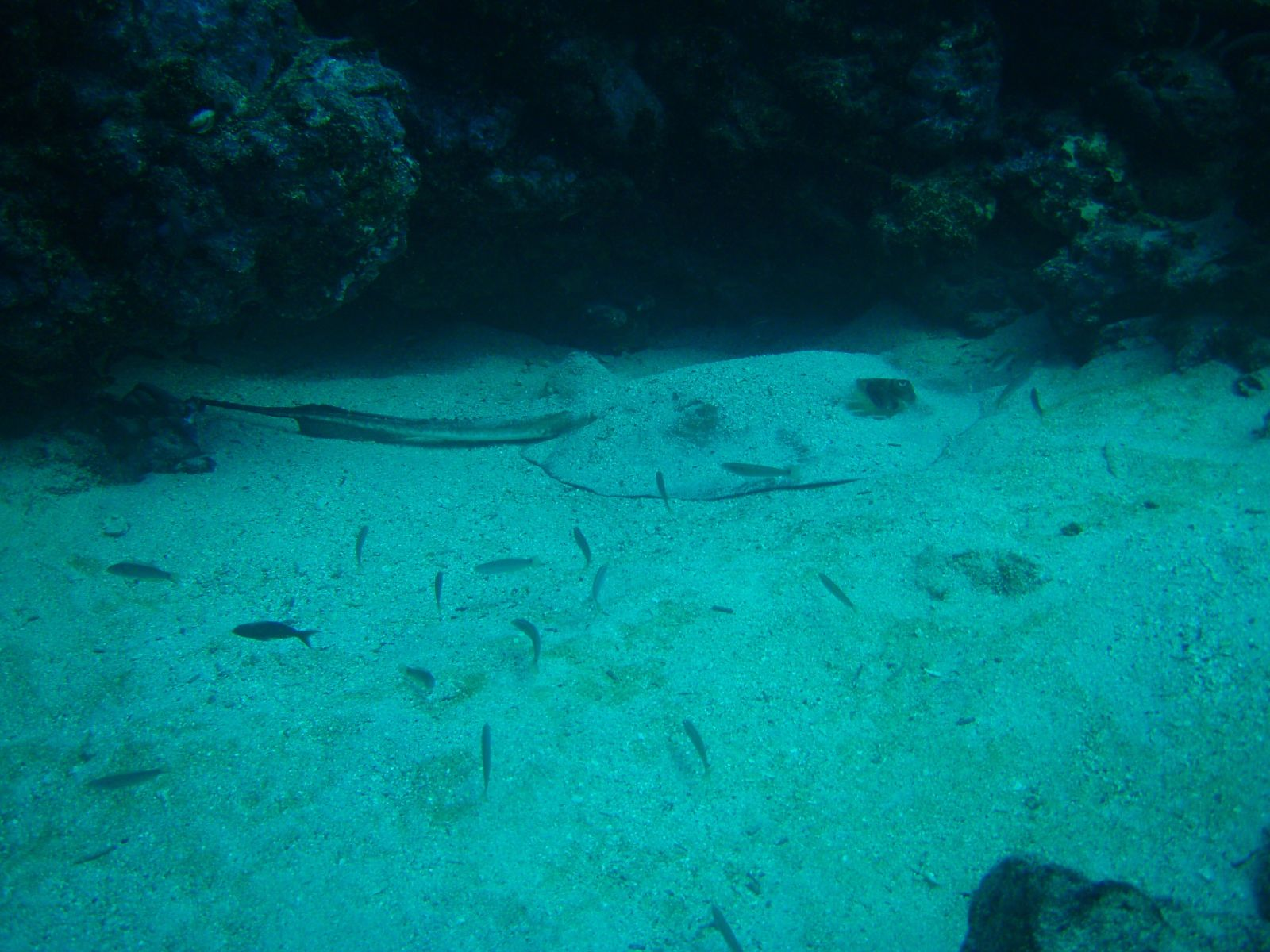
A distinguishing trait of the diamond stingray is the presence of fin folds both above and below the tail.

The diamond stingray attains a disc width of 1 m (3.3 ft) or possibly 1.2 m (3.9 ft); females grow larger than males. Its pectoral fin disc is rhomboid in shape, slightly wider than long, with angular outer corners and subtly convex margins. The snout is blunt-angled and non-projecting. The eyes are fairly large and immediately followed by the spiracles (paired respiratory openings). The mouth is strongly curved, containing 21–37 upper tooth rows and 23–44 lower tooth rows; the teeth are small and blunt, and arranged into flattened surfaces. Three or five papillae (nipple-like structures) are found in a row across the floor of the mouth.

The whip-like tail generally measures up to one and half times the length of the disc, and bears one (more if replacements have grown in) long, slender, serrated spine on the upper surface, closer to the base than the tip. Behind the spine, there are long dorsal and ventral fin folds that rise gradually, reaching a relatively high apex before sloping down abruptly. The presence of the upper fin fold separates this species from the similar longtail stingray (D. longa), which shares most of its range. However, the tail is often damaged, in which case differentiating the two species in the field becomes all but impossible. Young rays have completely smooth skin, while adults develop a row of low tubercles along the midline of the back, flanked by two shorter rows on the "shoulders". The tail also becomes covered in prickles. This species is a uniform olive to brown to gray above, darkening to black on the tail, and off-white below.

== Biology and ecology ==
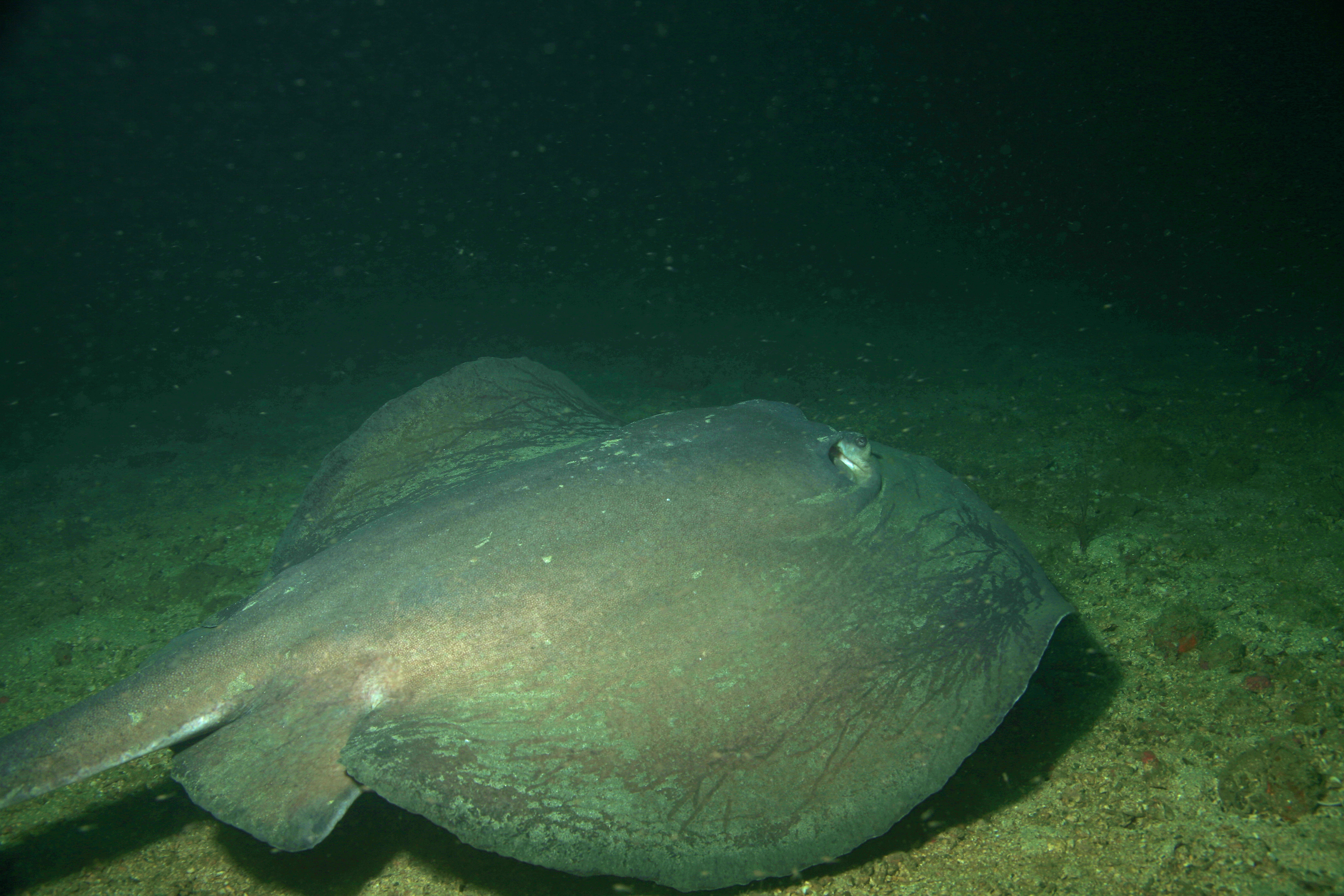
The diamond stingray may be found alone, but more often forms groups of varying size.

The diamond stingray is most active at night, spending much of the day buried in sand with only its eyes protruding. When foraging for food, it may be solitary but more commonly forms groups numbering up to the hundreds. There is strong segregation by sex and age. This species feeds on crustaceans, molluscs, and other invertebrates, as well as small bony fishes; its powerful jaws and molar-like teeth allow it to crush hard-shelled prey. It mainly targets burrowing organisms, but may also take prey exposed on the bottom. There is a record of a female 69 cm (27 in) across, that had gorged herself on at least 30 small crabs. In the Bahía Magdalena lagoon complex, Baja California Sur, its most important source of food are pea crabs, followed by the razor clam Solyema valvulus, and then polychaete worms.

The typical hunting strategy of the diamond stingray is to cruise just above the sea floor, landing atop any prey encountered. It then quickly levers its body up-and-down with its disc, producing negative pressure to extract the prey from its burrow. This ray has also been known to excavate large pits by undulating its disc and spitting jets of water, so as to uncover buried prey. Diamond stingrays are frequently trailed by smaller fishes, including Mexican hogfish (Bodianus diplotaenia), Galapagos porgies (Calamus taurinus), greybar grunts (Haemulon sexfasciatum), spinster wrasses (Halichoeres nichols), and long-spine porcupinefish (Diodon holocanthus), which take advantage of the invertebrates stirred up by the ray's activities. Known parasites of this species include the tapeworms Acanthobothrium bullardi, A. dasi, A. rajivi, and A. soberoni, Anthocephalum currani, Parachristianella tiygonis, and Pseudochristianello elegantissima, the flukes Anaporrhutum euzeti and Probolitrema mexicana, and the monogenean Listrocephalos kearni.

Like other stingrays, the diamond stingray is aplacental viviparous: the embryos are initially nourished by yolk, and later by histotroph ("uterine milk", rich in proteins and lipids) produced by the mother. Only the left ovary and uterus are functional in adult females. Several bays along the Pacific coast of Baja California are known to serve as nurseries. Most of the life history information available on this species has come from Bahía Magdalena, where females bear one litter of 1–4 pups per year. Courtship and mating occurs in late summer from July to August, but due to a ten-month period of either sperm storage or diapause (wherein the embryo becomes dormant), embryonic development does not begin until the following year and is completed within 2–3 months. Birthing takes place in summer from July to September in shallow estuaries; the newborns measure 18–23 cm (7.1–9.1 in) across. During El Niño years, the higher temperatures appear to shift the timing of birth forward. The diamond stingray has the lowest growth rate of any stingray species yet studied. Males reach sexual maturity at around 43–47 cm (17–19 in) across and 7 years of age, while females grow slower still, reaching maturity at around 57–66 cm (22–26 in) across and 10 years of age. The maximum lifespan has been estimated at least 19 years for males and 28 years for females.

== Human interactions ==
At least one fatality off southern California has resulted from the long, venomous tail spine of the diamond stingray. However, it is not aggressive and will usually flee given the opportunity. This ray is not found off the United States in sufficient numbers to be economically important. Elsewhere in its range, it is caught in substantial numbers for human consumption, both intentionally and as bycatch; the pectoral fins or "wings" are sold fresh or filleted and salted. The International Union for Conservation of Nature (IUCN) notes that the diamond stingray's low reproductive productivity renders it susceptible to population depletion, and assesses it as Vulnerable overall.

In Mexico, the diamond stingray is one of the most important components of Pacific artisanal shark and ray fisheries, comprising around a tenth of the total annual catch. Its significance is likely underestimated, as Mexican fishery reports frequently suffer from misidentifications and a lack of species-specific data. It is mainly caught during summer and fall, being the most common ray landed in Bahía Magdalena, and second most common ray landed off Sonora state. Demersal gillnets are the main fishing gear employed; both adult and juvenile rays easily become entangled in the mesh by their tail spines, with juveniles known to have comprised most of the Bahía Magdalena catch in 1998–2000. This species is also often caught incidentally in bottom trawls, on longlines, and in fish traps. In the future, habitat degradation from increasing numbers of shrimp farms may pose an additional threat to this species in the region. No management schemes have yet been enacted for this species.
