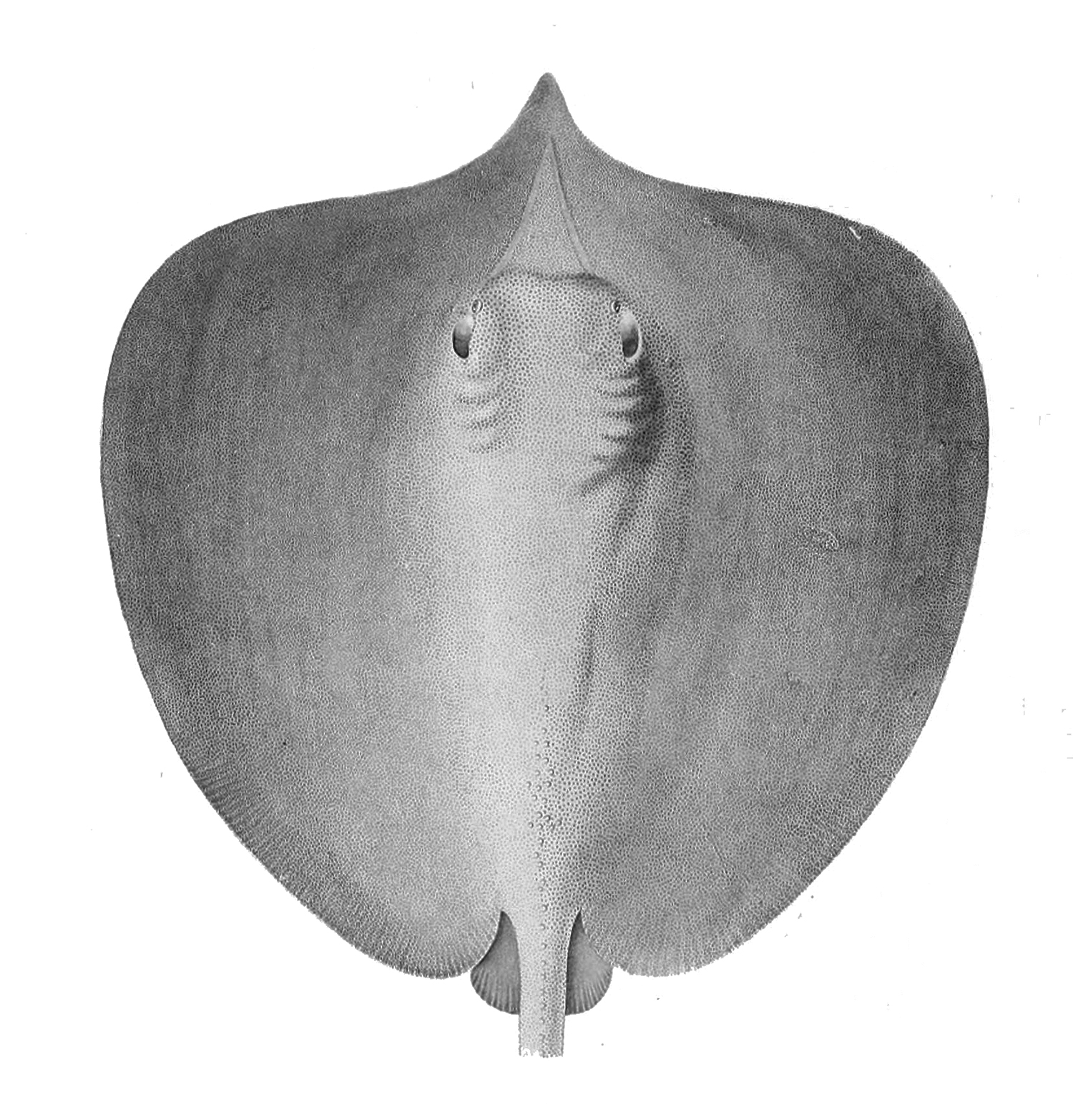
- Annandale's 1910 representation of Himantura fluviatilis

Conservation status
- Vulnerable (IUCN 3.1)

Scientific classification
- Kingdom: Animalia
- Phylum: Chordata
- Class: Chondrichthyes
- Subclass: Elasmobranchii
- Order: Myliobatiformes
- Family: Dasyatidae
- Genus: Himantura
- Species: H. fluviatilis

Binomial name
- Himantura fluviatilis (Hamilton, 1822)

Synonyms
- Raja fluviatilis Hamilton, 1822; Trygon fluviatilis (Hamilton, 1822)

= Himantura fluviatilis =

Ganges whipray

Species of cartilaginous fish

Himantura fluviatilis, the Ganges whip ray, is an obscure species of stingray in the family Dasyatidae, apparently endemic to the Ganges River system and adjacent marine waters. With an oval pectoral fin disc and long projecting snout, it closely resembles, and may be the same species as Himantura chaophraya (a synonym of the Giant freshwater stingray of Southeast Asia). Growing to 1.4 m (4.6 ft) across, it is a plain dark colour above, and lighter below with wide dark bands on the lateral disc margins. The International Union for Conservation of Nature (IUCN) has listed this species as Endangered, as it faces overfishing and habitat degradation within its heavily populated range.

== Taxonomy ==
Scottish physician, geographer, and naturalist Francis Buchanan-Hamilton, in his 1822 account of Ganges River fishes, made reference to a species of freshwater stingray he named Raia fluviatilis. However, he deferred making a description until an illustration could be made, an opportunity that never arose, and as a result his account only notes that the ray "has a strong resemblance to Raia lymma [=Taeniura lymma] [and] has nearly the same manners as Raia aquila [=Myliobatis aquila]". Subsequent authors have published accounts of this species under the name Trygon fluviatilis, and then Himantura fluviatilis, while noting that the name has questionable validity due to the paucity of Hamilton's description. The IUCN Red List still lists H. fluviatilis as synonym of the Cowtail stingray. The Ganges stingray belongs to the same species group as H. chaophraya; the two species may in fact be synonymous, but this cannot yet be confirmed as no specimens are available for comparison.

== Distribution and habitat ==
Hamilton noted that the Ganges stingray was common in the Ganges River system from the estuary to the area around Kanpur, some 1,600 km (1,000 mi) from the furthest extent of the tide. Later authors have also reported it from shallow bays in Bay of Bengal, and at a depth of 37–55 m (120–180 ft) near Madras. This ray is likely completely isolated from other populations of freshwater stingrays in various parts of Southeast Asia.

== Description ==
The Ganges stingray has a very thin, oval pectoral fin disc slightly wider than long, with broadly rounded lateral margins. The snout tapers to a narrow point and projects considerably beyond the disc, measuring over twice as long as the distance between the eyes, which are very small. The tail is whip-like, lacks fin folds, and is less than twice as long as the disc. The entire upper surface, except for the pelvic fins, is covered by dermal denticles that become larger on the head. Some of the denticles on the posterior half of the body are also enlarged, and bear sharp spines. Large areas of the underside are covered by minute denticles. The coloration is a plain purplish grey above, becoming darker towards the disc margins, and light below with broad, irregular dark bands bordering the lateral margins. This is a large species, reaching a width of at least 1.4 m (4.6 ft).

== Biology and ecology ==
Virtually nothing is known of the natural history of the Ganges stingray. It is presumably aplacental viviparous like other members of its order.

== Human interactions ==
Only a few specimens of Ganges stingray are recorded in literature, none of which remain to the present day. Hamilton noted that this ray was often sold at Kanpur markets, and that its tail spine can inflict "very dangerous wounds". It probably continues to be caught as bycatch within its range. The International Union for Conservation of Nature (IUCN) has assessed the Ganges stingray as Endangered: it has a restricted distribution in a heavily populated region, which renders it susceptible to overfishing and habitat degradation.

It has often been mistaken as a disjunct population of Urogymnus polylepis or even the Cowtail stingray.

A "Giant stingray" was caught in 2019 in a river in Odisha, India. This species of Indian Giant freshwater stingray species are rarely found because most of the rivers which they live are severely polluted due to human interaction.

The Ganges river stingray is a protected species in India, being listed on Schedule I of the Indian Wildlife (Protection) Act of 1972, a status that it shares with the rare Ganges shark.

A reported sighting of a dead Ganges River stingray in 2002 states that it had a 76 cm (30 in) disc width. It was found dead in the Chambal River.
