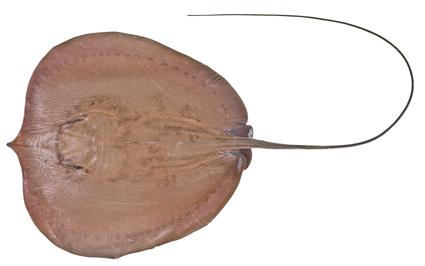

Conservation status
- Least Concern (IUCN 3.1)

Scientific classification
- Kingdom: Animalia
- Phylum: Chordata
- Class: Chondrichthyes
- Subclass: Elasmobranchii
- Order: Myliobatiformes
- Family: Dasyatidae
- Genus: Urogymnus
- Species: U. dalyensis

Binomial name
- Urogymnus dalyensis (Last & Manjaji-Matsumoto, 2008)

Synonyms
- Himantura dalyensis Last & Manjaji-Matsumoto, 2008

= Freshwater whipray =

Species of fish

The freshwater whipray (Urogymnus dalyensis) is a little-known species of stingray in the family Dasyatidae, found in a number of large rivers and associated estuaries in northern Australia. Until recently, this species was regarded as a regional subpopulation of the similar-looking but much larger giant freshwater stingray (U. polylepsis) of Southeast Asia. Typically reaching 1 m (3.3 ft) across, the freshwater whipray has a distinctively shaped, rounded pectoral fin disc, a projecting snout, and a thin tail without fin folds. It is plain brown above and white below with dark marginal bands. It may occasionally travel onto land and can "breathe" out of water for up to 7 minutes. The freshwater whipray is an active hunter of small fishes and shrimps, and does not currently face substantial conservation threats.

== Taxonomy ==
The first known specimen of the freshwater whipray was caught during a 1989 scientific expedition from the Daly River, after which it would eventually be named. Various authors have mistakenly referred to this ray as the estuary stingray (Hemitrygon fluviorium), or identified it with the similar U. polylepsis. Morphological and molecular phylogenetic studies have since found that this species is in fact distinct from U. polylepsis, and it was formally described by Peter Last and B. Mabel Manjaji-Matsumoto in a 2008 Commonwealth Scientific and Industrial Research Organisation (CSIRO) paper. The type specimen is a juvenile male 62 cm (24 in) across, collected from the Pentecost River.

== Distribution and habitat ==
The only Australian stingray confined to fresh and brackish waters, the freshwater whipray has been thus far been reported from the Daly, Fitzroy, Gilbert, Mitchell, Normanby, Ord, Pentecost, Roper, South Alligator, and Wenlock Rivers in northern Australia, and may well inhabit most large, tropical Australian rivers. The stingrays in the Fly River, Papua New Guinea, may also belong to this species. This bottom-dwelling species occurs at a depth of 1–4 m (3.3–13.1 ft). Most individuals are found in water with a salinity of under 10 ppt, but some have been caught from water with a salinity of up to 30 ppt.

== Description ==
The freshwater stingray has an apple-shaped pectoral fin disc approximately as wide as long, with the leading margins almost straight and transverse. The moderately long, obtuse snout is flattened with a pointed tip that projects from the disc. The eyes are small and immediately followed by much larger spiracles. There is a broad, somewhat rectangular curtain of skin between the nares, with a subtly fringed posterior margin. The mouth is gently arched and contains a pair of large papillae near the center and 2–3 much smaller papillae near the corners. There are around 37 upper tooth rows and 45 lower tooth rows; the teeth are small, each with a horizontal ridge and groove, and arranged with a quincunx pattern. The pelvic fins are small, no more than a fifth as long as the disc width. The tail tapers from a narrow base to become thin and whip-like, and measures more or less twice the disc length. There is a single serrated stinging spine on top of the tail; the fin folds are absent.

The entire upper surface of the disc is densely covered by small dermal denticles that are heart or oval-shaped around the "shoulders" and become tiny and granular towards the disc margins; there are also around 5 relatively large denticles at the center of the disc. The tail is roughened by denticles above and below, with the largest positioned in a midline row before the spine. The dorsal coloration is a uniform light brown to gray-brown, darkening to blackish past the tail spine. The underside of the disc and tail is white, with dark brown bands around the fin margins; the inner margin of the band is irregular, breaking up into small blotches that reach the belly. This species attains a disc width of 1.24 m (4.1 ft), but most do not exceed 1 m (3.3 ft) across. The freshwater whipray is close in appearance to the much larger giant freshwater stingray, but has a shorter, more obtuse snout and narrower dark ventral bands. The two species also differ in several morphometric and meristic characters.

== Biology and ecology ==
Little is known of the freshwater whipray's natural history. It feeds on small fishes and shrimps, and has been observed lunging up riverbanks and taking prey caught in its wash. There is a male specimen on record that was adolescent at a disc width of 88 cm (35 in).

== Human interactions ==
The International Union for Conservation of Nature (IUCN) has noted that the prospects for freshwater whiprays in Australia are likely favorable. However, there is concern that the South Alligator River subpopulation in Kakadu National Park may be negatively affected by contaminants from exploratory uranium mines upstream.
