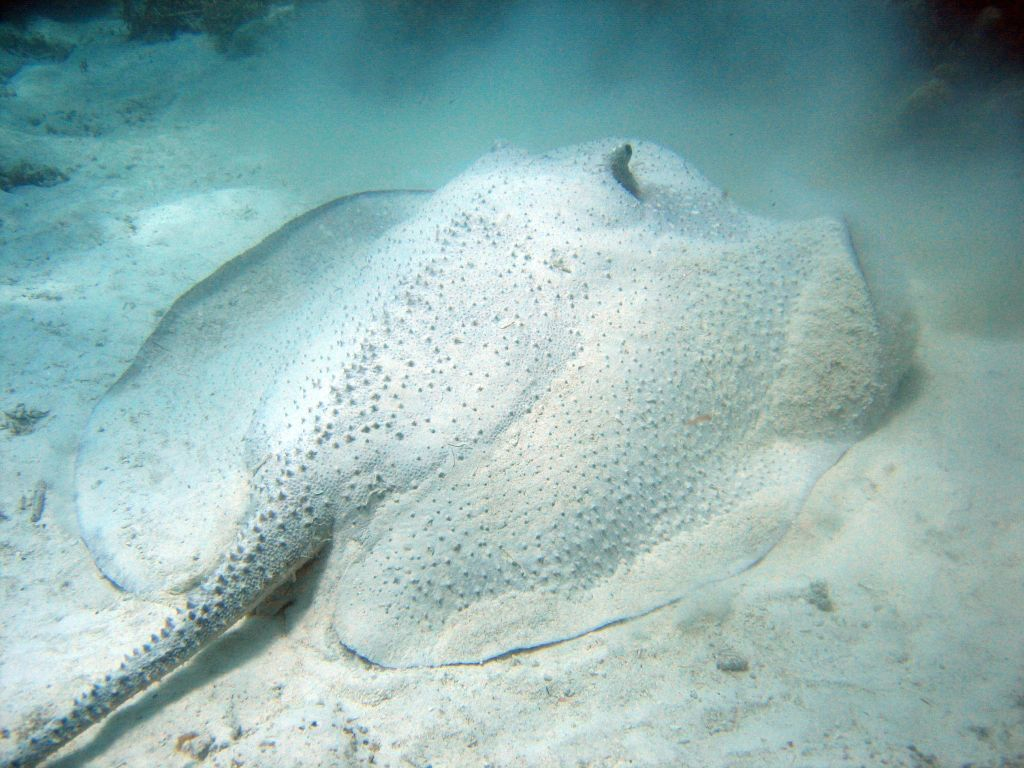

Conservation status
- Endangered (IUCN 3.1)

Scientific classification
- Kingdom: Animalia
- Phylum: Chordata
- Class: Chondrichthyes
- Subclass: Elasmobranchii
- Order: Myliobatiformes
- Family: Dasyatidae
- Genus: Urogymnus
- Species: U. asperrimus

Binomial name
- Urogymnus asperrimus (Bloch & J. G. Schneider, 1801)
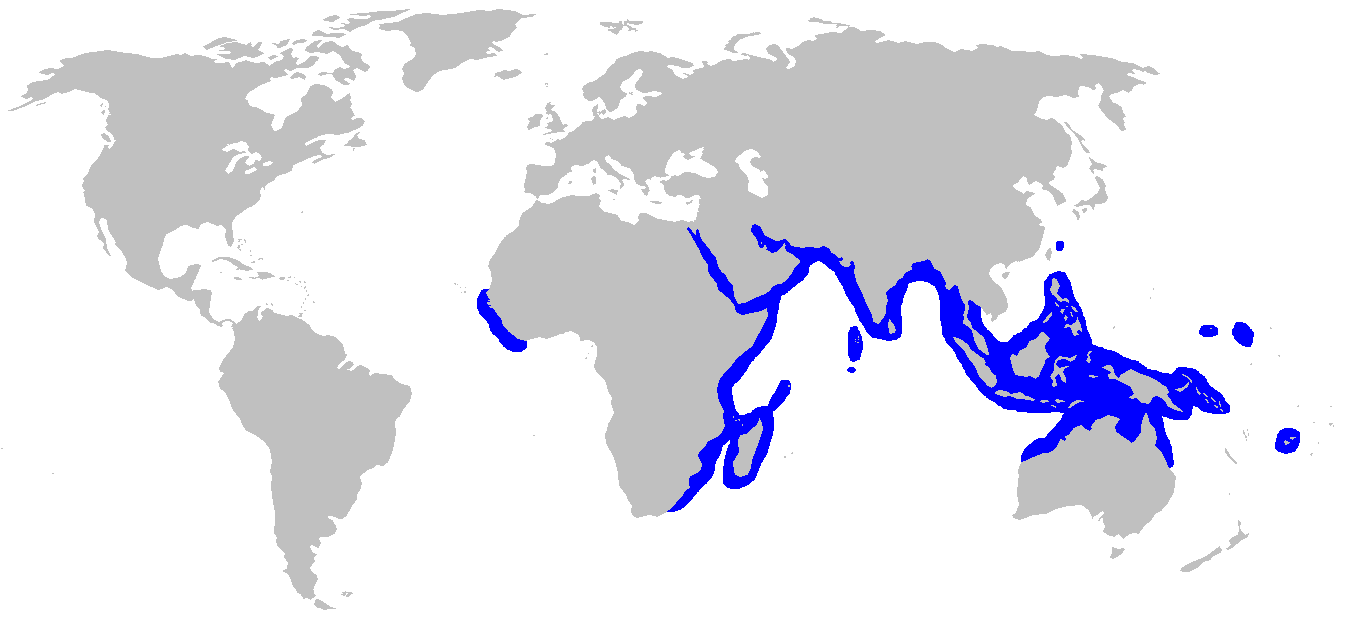
- Range of the porcupine ray

Synonyms
- Raja africana Bloch & Schneider, 1801; Raja asperrima Bloch & Schneider, 1801; Urogymnus asperrimus solanderi Whitley, 1939; Urogymnus rhombeus Klunzinger, 1871

= Porcupine ray =

Species of cartilaginous fish

The porcupine ray (Urogymnus asperrimus) is a rare species of stingray in the family Dasyatidae. This bottom-dweller is found throughout the tropical Indo-Pacific, as well as off West Africa. It favors sand, coral rubble, and seagrass habitats in inshore waters to a depth of 30 m (100 ft). A large and heavy-bodied species reaching 1.2–1.5 m (3.9–4.9 ft) in width, the porcupine ray has a nearly circular, plain-colored pectoral fin disc and a thin tail without any fin folds. Uniquely within its family, it lacks a venomous stinging spine. However, an adult ray can still defend itself ably with the many large, sharp thorns found over its disc and tail.

The diet of the porcupine ray consists mainly of benthic invertebrates and bony fishes, which it digs up from the sea floor. It is aplacental viviparous, in which the developing embryos are nourished by histotroph ("uterine milk") produced by the mother. The porcupine ray has long been valued for its rough and durable skin, which was made into a shagreen leather once used for various utilitarian and ornamental purposes, such as to cover sword hilts and shields. It is caught incidentally by coastal fisheries. Because it must be handled carefully due to its thorns, its commercial significance is limited. Unregulated fishing has led to this species declining in many parts of its range, thus it has been listed as Endangered by the International Union for Conservation of Nature.

== Taxonomy ==
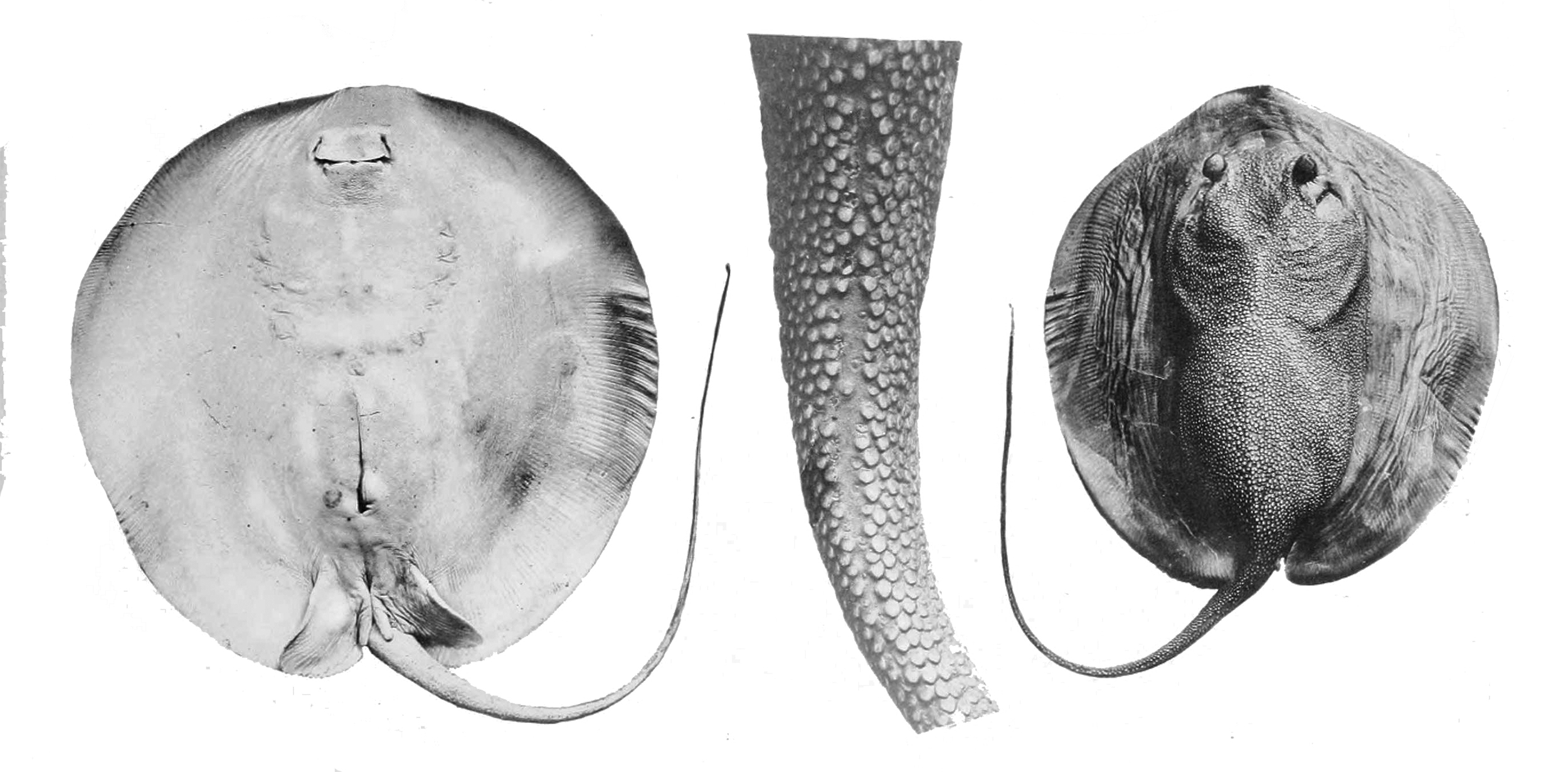
Early pictures of a porcupine ray by Nelson Annandale

German naturalists Marcus Elieser Bloch and Johann Gottlob Schneider described the porcupine ray in their 1801 work Systema Ichthyologiae, based on a partial dried skin obtained from Mumbai, India. They placed it in the genus Raja and named it asperrima, meaning "roughest" in Latin. In the same work, they also described a West African form, Raja africana. Later authors have regarded the two as synonymous. However, since the two names were published simultaneously, uncertainty exists about which name has priority. Some works give the ray's specific epithet as asperrimus, and others as africanus.

In 1837, Johannes Peter Müller and Friedrich Gustav Jakob Henle placed the porcupine ray in a new genus, Gymnura. As the name Gymnura was already in use, referring to the butterfly rays, so later that year, Müller and Henle replaced it with Urogymnus. Both names are derived from the Ancient Greek oura ("tail") and gymnos ("naked" or "unarmed"), referring to the lack of a tail sting. Urogymnus has traditionally been considered monotypic (only containing U. asperrimus), but several other species were moved to this genus from Himantura in 2016 based on morphology and molecular evidence.

Other common names for this species include black spotted ray, rough-skinned ray, roughback stingaree, Solander's ray, and thorny ray. More than one species of porcupine ray may exist, as is currently recognized.

== Distribution and habitat ==
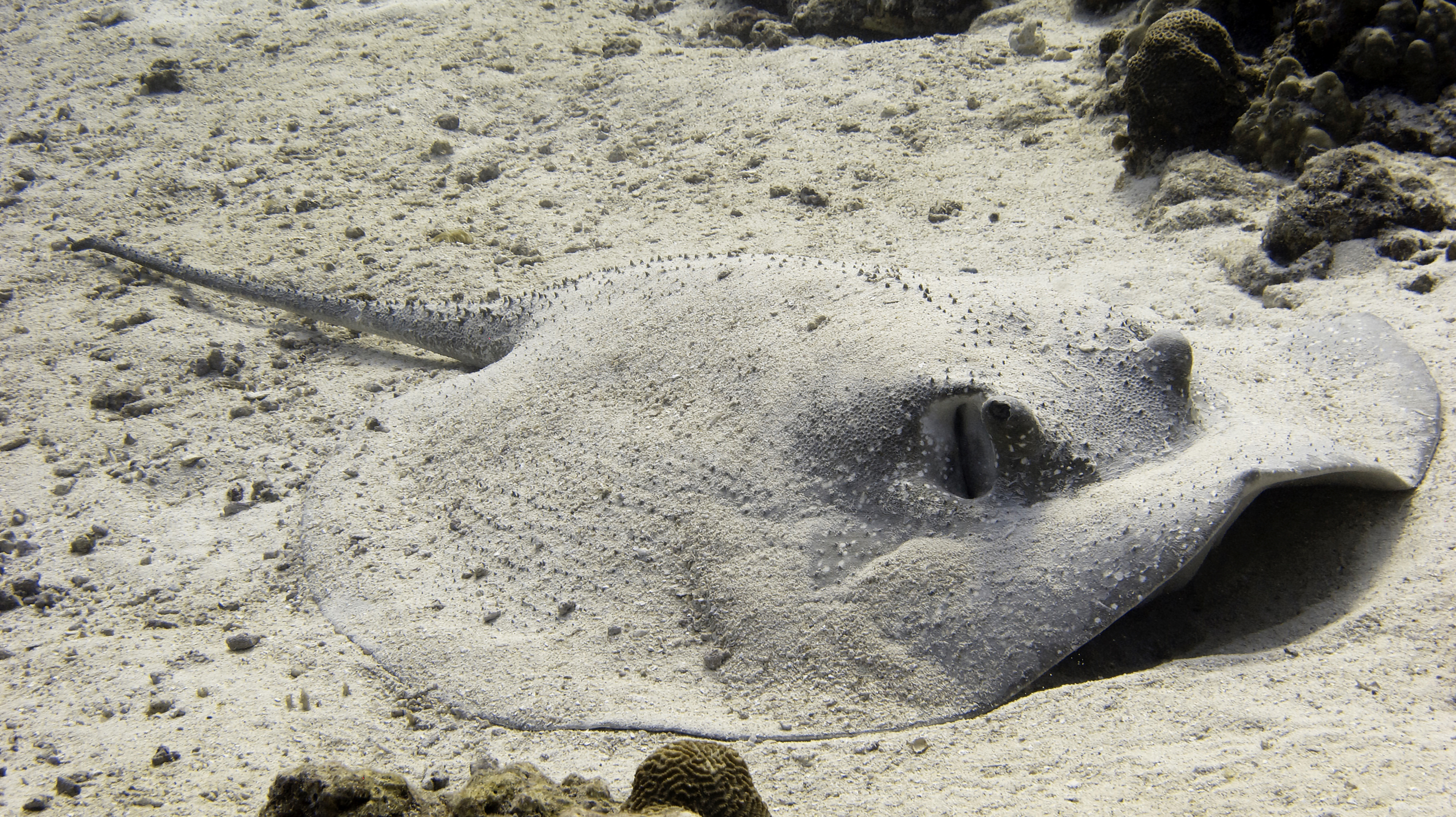
Porcupine ray partly covered in sand, in Lakshadweep, India

The porcupine ray is widely distributed, but uncommon compared to other stingrays that share its range. It is found all along the continental periphery of the Indian Ocean, from South Africa to the Arabian Peninsula to Southeast Asia to Ningaloo Reef off western Australia, including Madagascar, the Seychelles, and Sri Lanka; it has colonized the eastern Mediterranean Sea through the Suez Canal. In the Pacific Ocean, its range continues through Indonesia and New Guinea, north to the Philippines, east to the Gilbert Islands and Fiji, and south to Heron Island off eastern Australia. This species is also found in the eastern Atlantic Ocean off Senegal, Guinea, and Côte d'Ivoire. Bottom-dwelling in nature, the porcupine ray is found close to shore at depths of 1–30 m (3–100 ft). It inhabits sandy flats, coral rubble, and seagrass beds, often near reefs, and also enters brackish water.

== Description ==
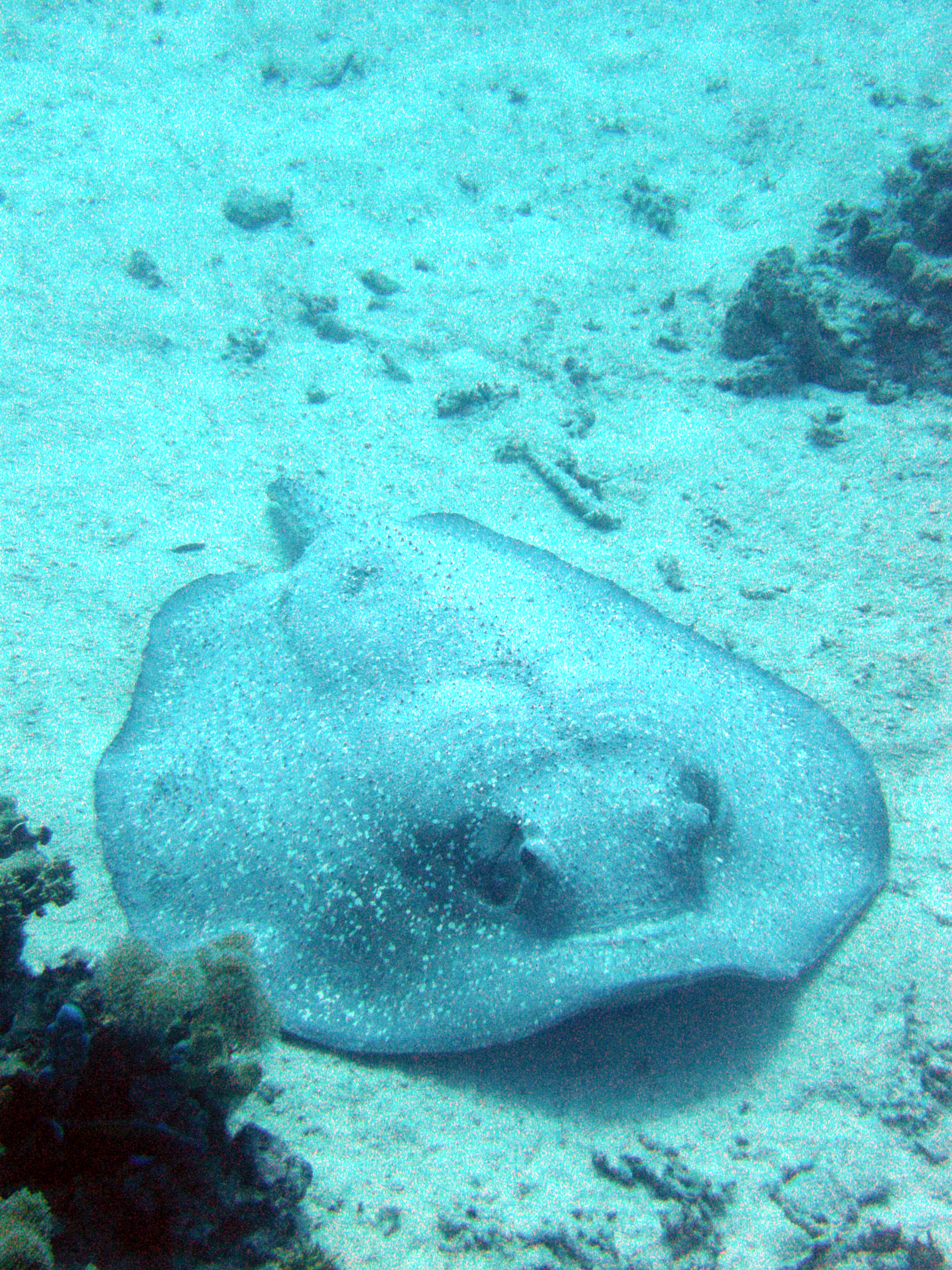
Distinctive traits of the porcupine ray include its thick, rounded shape, and dorsal covering of sharp thorns.

The pectoral fin disc of the porcupine ray is evenly oval, almost as wide as long, and very thick at the center, giving it a domed appearance. The tip of the snout is rounded and barely protruding. The small eyes are closely followed by much larger spiracles. Between the narrow nostrils is a skirt-shaped curtain of skin; the posterior margin of the curtain is strongly fringed and overhangs the mouth. The mouth bears three to five papillae on the floor and prominent furrows at the corners. The area around the mouth, including the curtain, are heavily covered by more papillae. Around 48 tooth rows are found in either jaw. The teeth are small and flattened. Five pairs of gill slits are located on the underside of the disc.

The pelvic fins are small and narrow. The thin, rapidly tapering tail is about equal to the disc in length and has an almost cylindrical cross-section, without fin folds. The tail also has no venomous stinging spine, unlike other members of the family. A dense patch of flattened, heart-shaped dermal denticles covers the center of the disc and extends onto the tail. Larger individuals additionally have numerous tall, sharp thorns over the entire upper surface of the disc. The porcupine ray is plain light to dark gray or brown above, darkening to blackish towards the tail tip, and white below. This large species grows to at least 1.2 m (3.9 ft) across and 2.2 m (7.2 ft) long, and may reach 1.5 m (4.9 ft) across.

== Biology and ecology ==
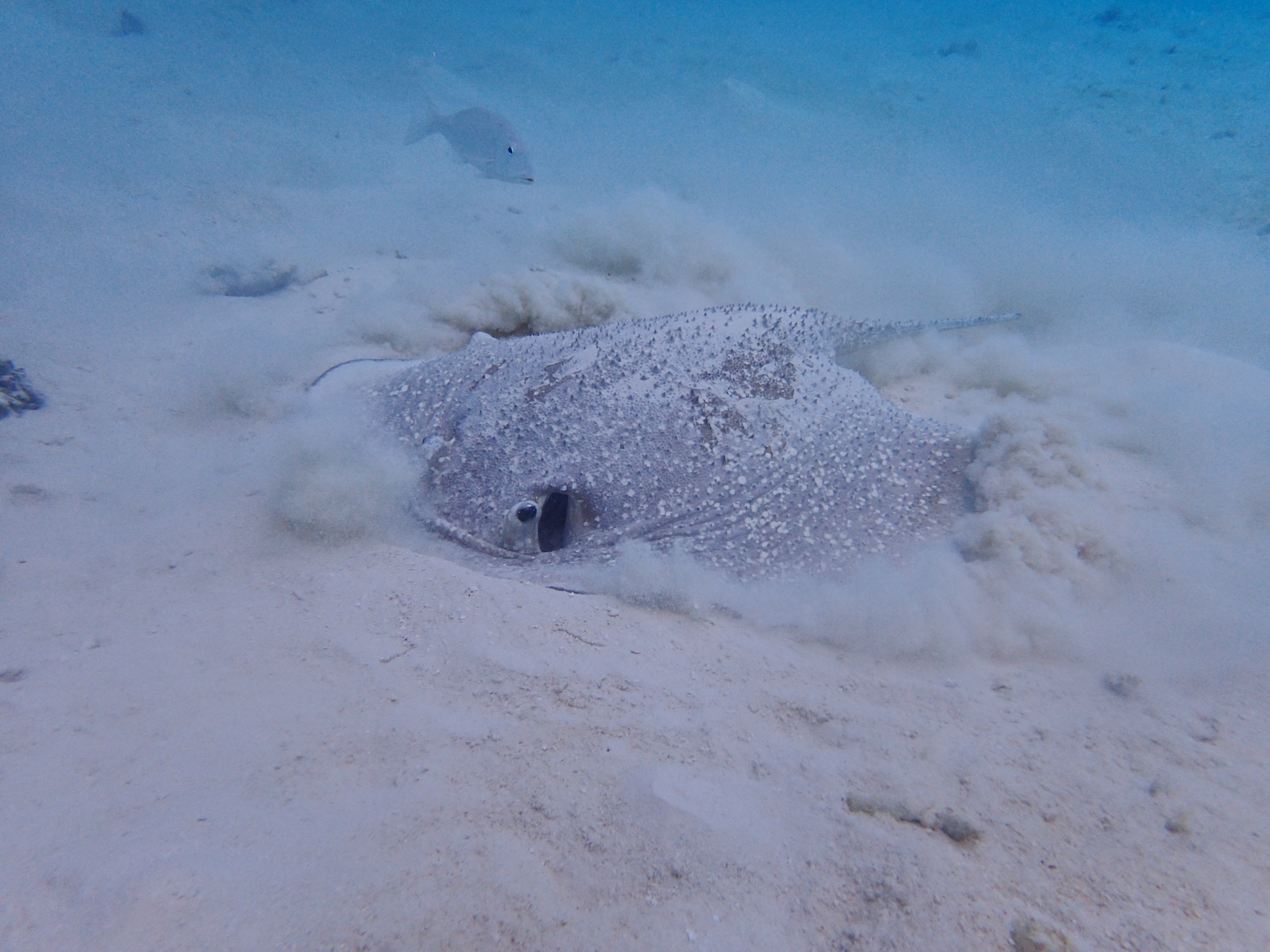
Porcupine ray digging itself into the sand of the lagoon, eating what it finds

The porcupine ray can sometimes be observed lying still on the bottom in the open or inside caves. It is known to form groups at Ningaloo Reef. Its diet consists primarily of sipunculids, polychaete worms, crustaceans, and bony fishes. When feeding, it plows deeply into the bottom, expelling excess sediment from its spiracles in a plume visible from a long distance away. Parasites documented from this ray include the tapeworm Rhinebothrium devaneyi, the nematode Echinocephalus overstreeti, and the capsalid monogeneans Dendromonocotyle urogymni and Neoentobdella baggioi. The porcupine ray is aplacental viviparous, with the developing embryos sustained to term by histotroph ("uterine milk") secreted by the mother. Mangrove forests serve as important habitat for juvenile rays. Males and females mature sexually at about 90 and 100 cm (35 and 39 in) across, respectively.

== Human interactions ==
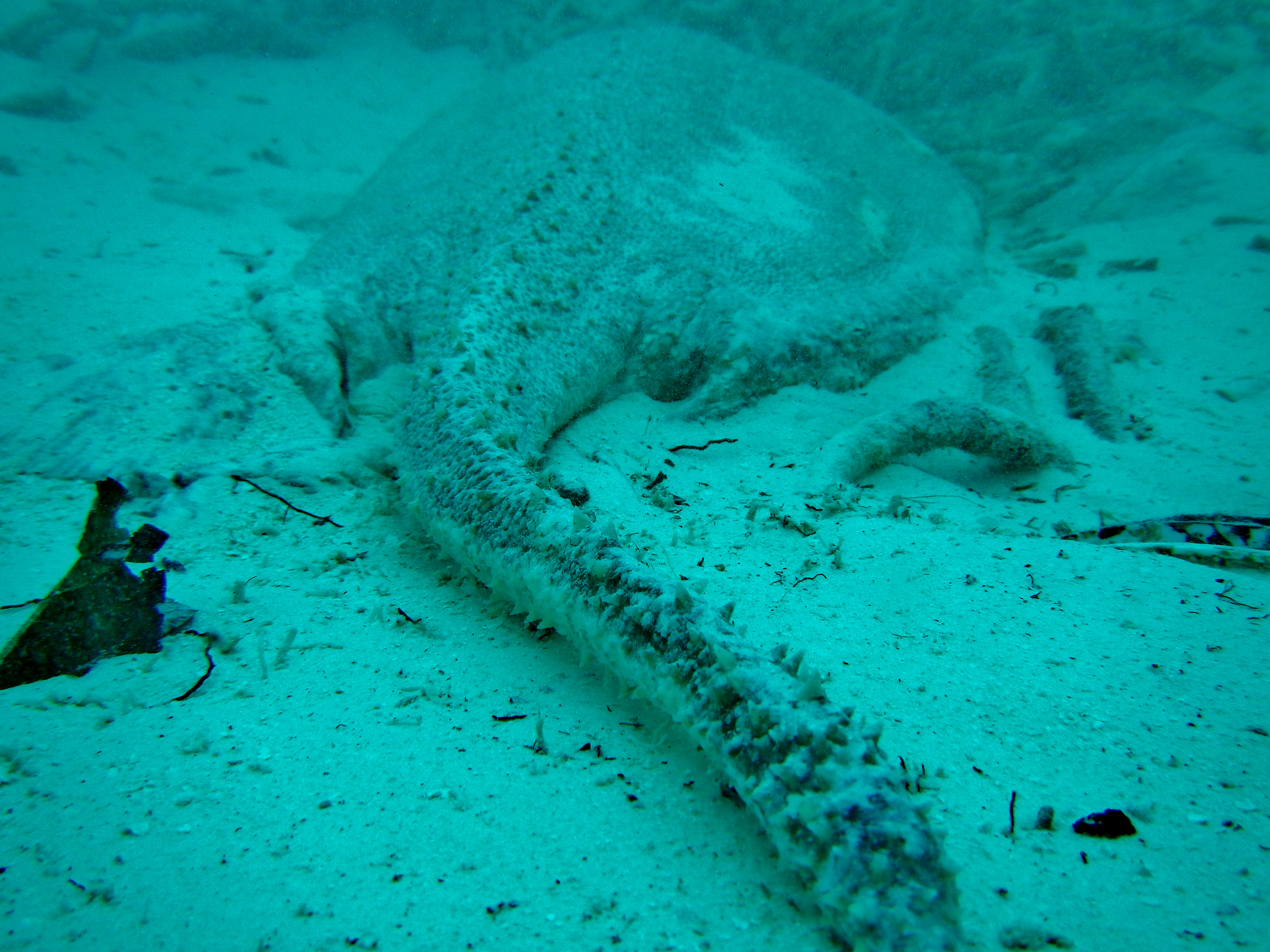
Close-up on the tail of a porcupine ray (Landaa Giraavaru, Maldives)

Despite not having a sting, the porcupine ray is capable of injuring humans with its many sharp thorns. It is reportedly bold and tolerant of being approached closely underwater. The tough, thorny skin of this ray, made into a form of leather called shagreen, had many historical uses. In particular, it was used to cover the hilts of various melee weapons, as its extremely rough texture prevented slippage during battle. For example, the Japanese deemed it the only species whose skin was acceptable for covering sword grips. The Malayans used it to cover shields. The skin was also used ornamentally, such as by the Chinese, who dyed it and ground down the thorns to yield a mottled pattern. The native inhabitants of Funafuti Atoll used dried portions of the ray's tail as a rasp-like tool.

Presently, the porcupine ray is caught incidentally in trawls, tangle nets, and beach seines. Its skin continues to be highly valued, while the meat and cartilage may also be used. In the Farasan Islands and some other places in the Red Sea, its liver is eaten as a seasonal dish. However, the economic importance of this ray is limited by how difficult it is to handle. The multispecies coastal fisheries that catch the porcupine ray are largely unregulated, which seems to have resulted in its dramatic decline or local extinction in the Bay of Bengal, the Gulf of Thailand, and likely elsewhere in its range. Potential additional threats to this species include habitat degradation from coastal development, and depletion of its food supply from overfishing. As a result, the International Union for Conservation of Nature has assessed it as endangered.
