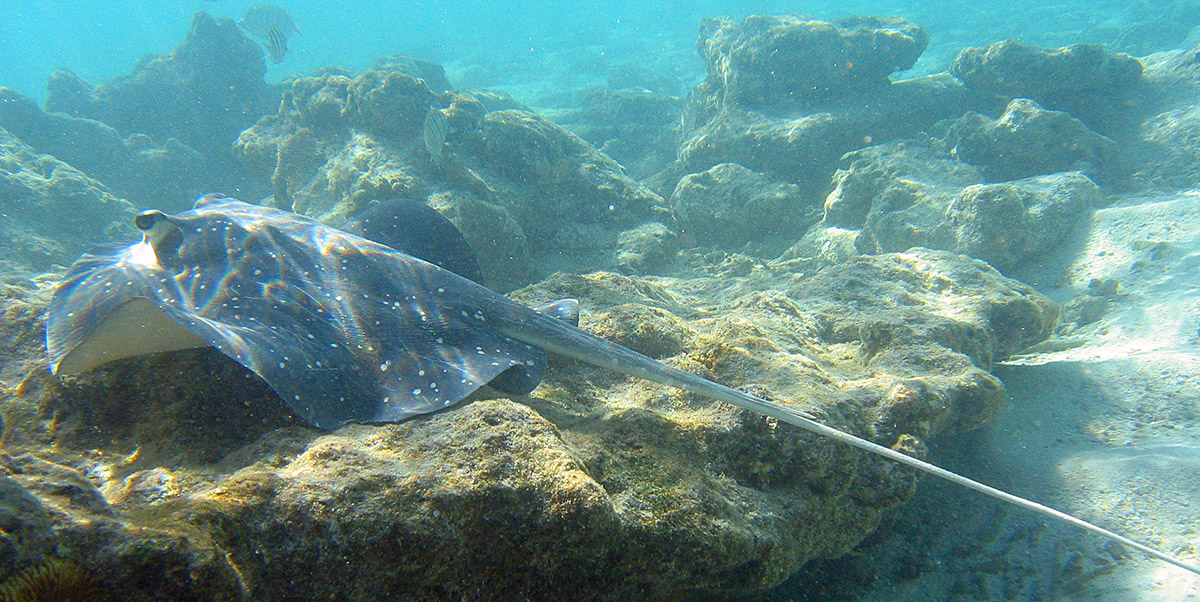

Conservation status
- Endangered (IUCN 3.1)

Scientific classification
- Kingdom: Animalia
- Phylum: Chordata
- Class: Chondrichthyes
- Subclass: Elasmobranchii
- Order: Myliobatiformes
- Family: Dasyatidae
- Genus: Urogymnus
- Species: U. granulatus

Binomial name
- Urogymnus granulatus (W. J. Macleay, 1883)
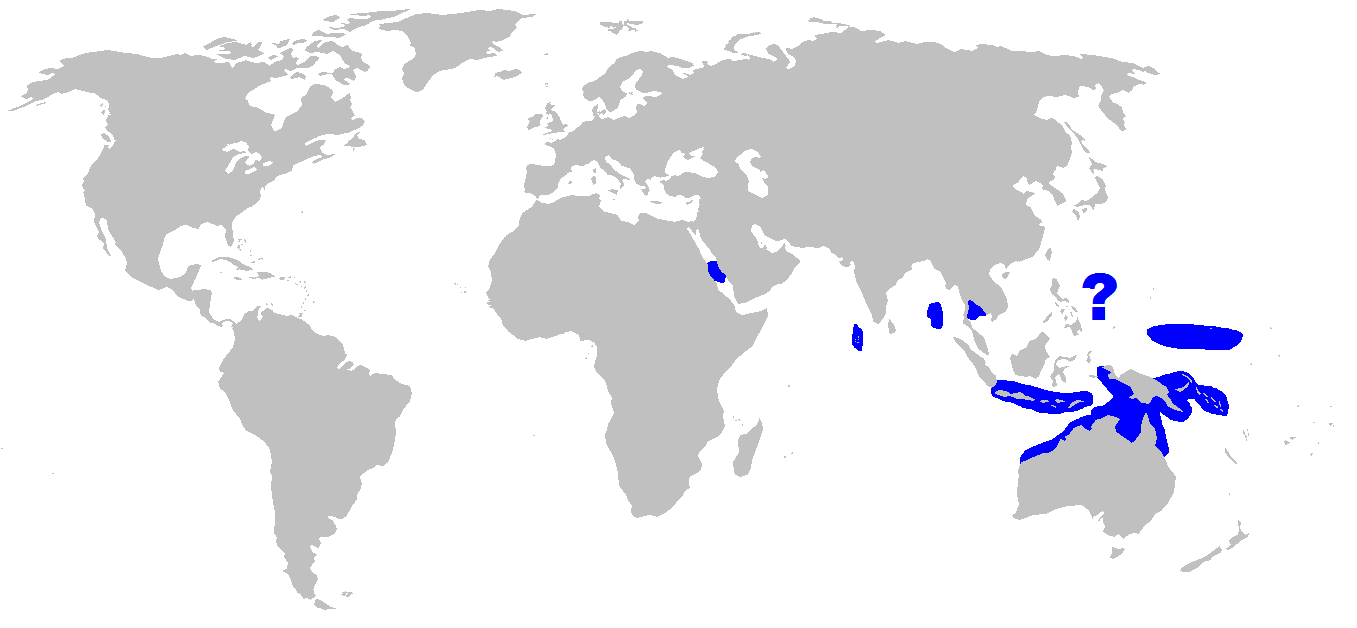
- Range of the mangrove whipray

Synonyms
- Trygon granulata Macleay, 1883; Trygon ponapensis Günther, 1910; Himantura granulata (Macleay, 1883)

= Mangrove whipray =

Species of cartilaginous fish

The mangrove whipray (Urogymnus granulatus) or whitetail stingray, is a species of stingray in the family Dasyatidae. It is widely distributed in the Indo-Pacific region from the Red Sea to northern Australia and Micronesia. A benthic inhabitant of shallow inshore waters, juvenile mangrove whiprays favor mangrove and estuarine habitats, while adults favor sandy to rocky areas in lagoons and coral reefs. This species can be identified by its thick, oval pectoral fin disc that is dark gray above with numerous white flecks, and by its relatively short, whip-like tail that is white past the stinging spine. It grows up to 1.4 m (4.6 ft) across.

Solitary in nature, the mangrove whipray preys mainly on small, bottom-dwelling bony fishes and invertebrates. It is, like other stingrays, aplacental viviparous, with the females nourishing their unborn young via histotroph ("uterine milk"). The mangrove whipray is caught for its meat, skin, and cartilage across much of its range. The International Union for Conservation of Nature (IUCN) has assessed it as Vulnerable globally and as Endangered in Southeast Asia, where its population has declined substantially due to intensive artisanal and commercial fisheries as well as widespread habitat degradation. In particular, juvenile rays have been disproportionately targeted by fishers and affected by the large-scale destruction of mangrove forests.

== Taxonomy ==
Australian zoologist William John Macleay published the first scientific account of the mangrove whipray, a brief description of an immature female 86 cm (34 in) long caught off Port Moresby, Papua New Guinea, in an 1883 volume of Proceedings of the Linnean Society of New South Wales. He named it Trygon granulata, as he noted that the specimen's head and back were "covered with small granules". In 1928, Gilbert Percy Whitley moved this species to the genus Himantura. It is, however, now considered to be in the genus Urogymnus.

== Description ==
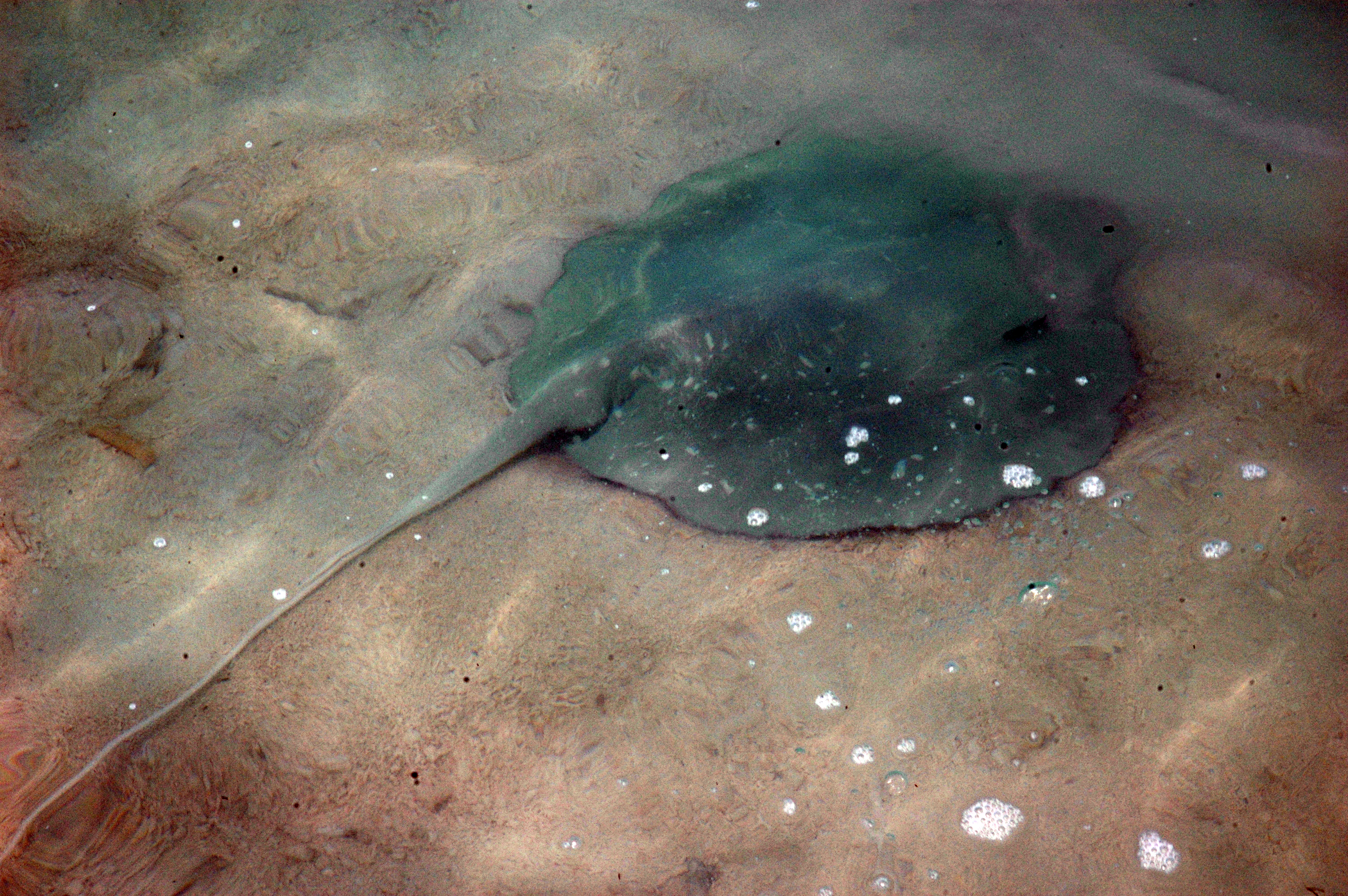
The mangrove whipray can be identified by its oval shape, dark body with small white spots, and short white tail.

The pectoral fin disc of the mangrove whipray is very thick and oval in shape, measuring 0.9–1.0 times as wide as long. The anterior margins of the disc are nearly straight and converge at a broad angle on the snout tip. The medium-sized, widely spaced eyes are immediately followed by the spiracles. Between the long, thin nostrils is a short, broad curtain of skin with a finely fringed posterior margin. The lower jaw is bow-shaped, and there are 0–5 papillae across the floor of the mouth. The teeth are arranged in a quincunx pattern and number 40–50 rows in the upper jaw and 38–50 rows in the lower jaw. There are five pairs of gill slits beneath the disc. The pelvic fins are small and narrow.

The tail is thick at the base and measures 1.5–2 times longer than the disc width. One or two dorsally positioned serrated stinging spines are located in the first third of the tail. Past the sting, the tail becomes thin and whip-like, without fin folds. The upper surface of the body and tail are roughened by tiny dermal denticles, which become larger towards the midline of the back and tail. In addition, one or two irregular rows of thorns are present along the dorsal midline from the head to the sting. The mangrove whipray is dark brown to gray above with many white dots and flecks, which become denser with increasing size. The dark coloration is due to a layer of mucus, without which the body is light orange-gray. The underside is white with small dark spots towards the disc margin. The tail abruptly becomes white past the sting. This species grows to 1.4 m (4.6 ft) across and over 3.5 m (11 ft) long.

== Distribution and habitat ==
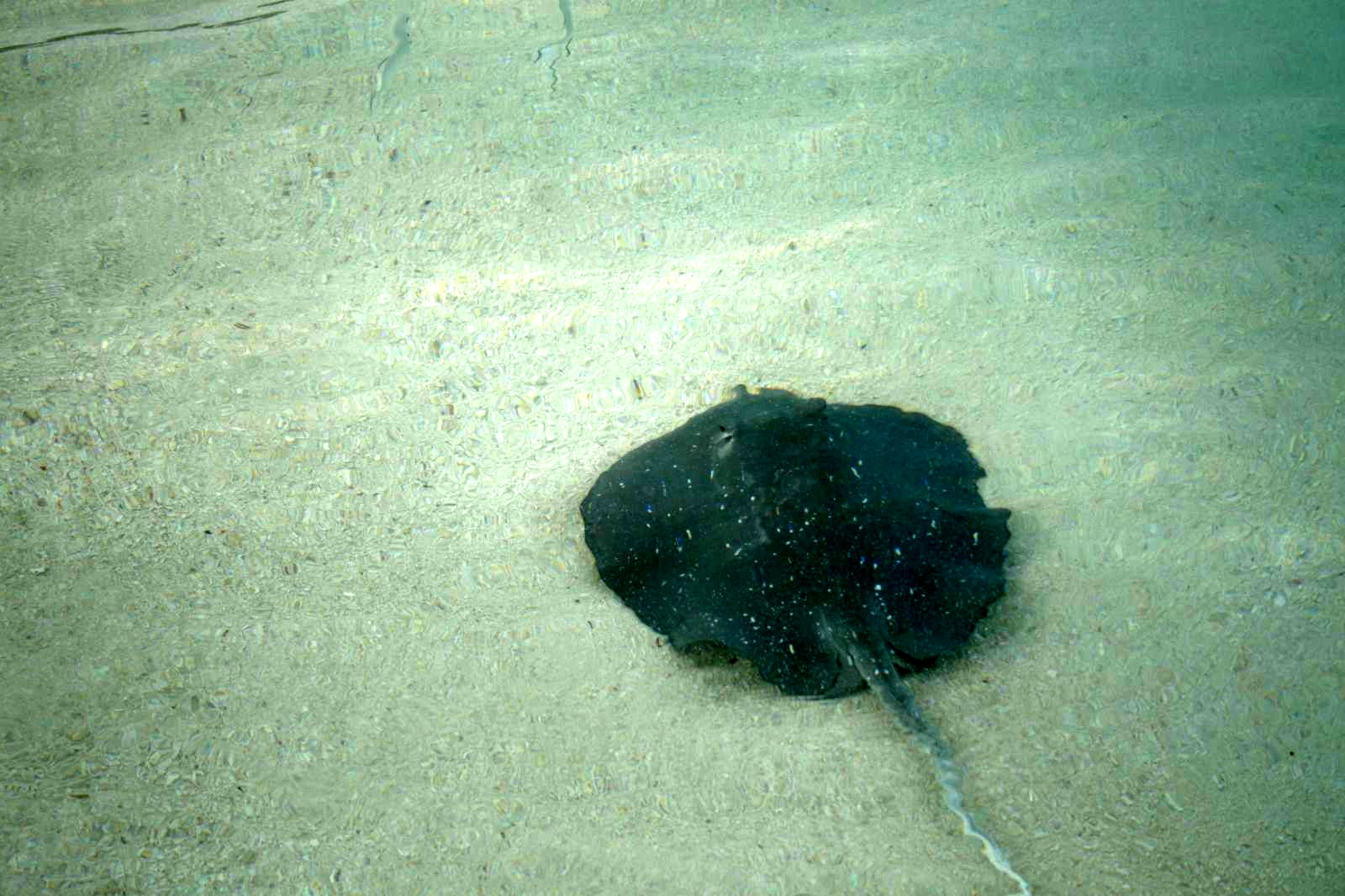
Adult mangrove whiprays can often be found in sandy or hard bottom habitats.

Although uncommon, the mangrove whipray seems to be widely distributed in the Indo-Pacific; it has been reported from the Red Sea, South Asia including the Maldives and the Andaman Islands, the Gulf of Thailand, the Malay Archipelago (except Sumatra), New Guinea and northern Australia, and various islands including Guam, Fiji, the Solomon Islands, and Micronesia. This bottom-dwelling species typically inhabits shallow water close to shore, though adults have also been recorded offshore to at least a depth of 85 m (279 ft). Juvenile rays frequent brackish habitats such as mangroves and estuaries. By contrast, adults prefer areas of sand, sand and rock rubble, or hard bottom, and are often found in lagoons or on coral reefs.

== Biology and ecology ==
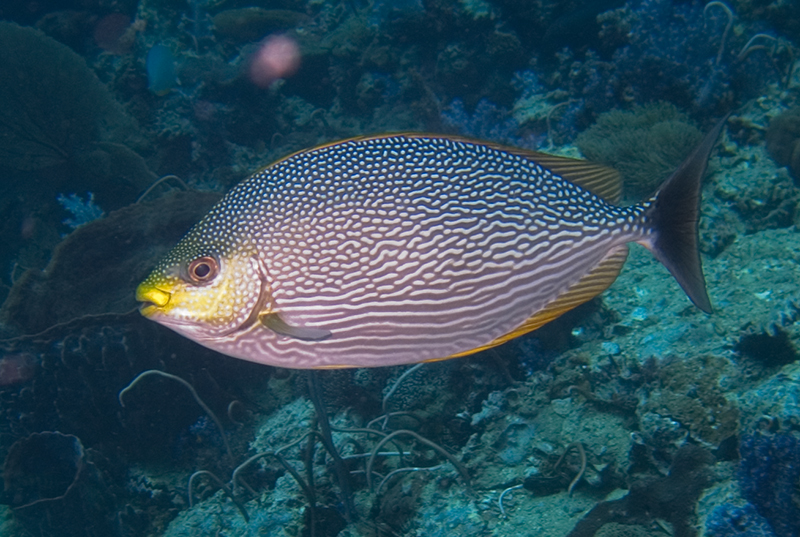
Rabbitfishes are among the prey consumed by the mangrove whipray.

Unlike many of its relatives, the mangrove whipray is reportedly solitary in nature. It is relatively inactive during the day, often resting half-buried in sand or atop coral heads, and actively forages for food at night. The electroreceptive ampullae of Lorenzini of this species have a sensitivity of 4 nV/cm and an effective range of 25 cm (10 in), enabling it to locate buried prey. Juveniles feed mainly on small crustaceans, including prawns and crabs. Adults prey on small benthic bony fishes, including rabbitfishes, gobies, blennies, wrasses, and damselfishes, as well as invertebrates, including peanut worms, crabs, octopuses, and bivalves. As in all stingrays, the mangrove whipray is aplacental viviparous, with the developing embryos being sustained by nutrient-rich histotroph ("uterine milk") produced by the mother. The newborns measure 14–28 cm (5.5–11.0 in) across, and males reach sexual maturity at 55–65 cm (22–26 in) across. Known parasites of this species include the tapeworm Rhinebothrium himanturi, and another undescribed species in the same genus.

== Human interactions ==
The mangrove whipray is capable of injuring a human with its venomous sting. It is occasionally caught in tangle nets and bottom trawls, and to a lesser extent on longlines; it is marketed for its meat, skin, and cartilage. Because of its inshore habitat preferences, this naturally uncommon species is highly susceptible to intensive artisanal and commercial fishing occurring across much of its range. In Southeast Asia, immature rays have been particularly affected by local fishing, as well as by habitat degradation from the widespread loss of mangrove forests. Additionally, the numbers of this species in the Arafura Sea have dropped significantly due to an Indonesian gillnet fishery targeting wedgefishes (Rhynchobatus), which involves over 600 vessels and has been increasingly operating illegally in Australian waters. These factors have led to an inferred decline of the Southeast Asian population by over 50%, leading the International Union for Conservation of Nature (IUCN) to give it a regional assessment of Endangered. The mangrove whipray is minimally threatened off northern Australia, where it is caught incidentally by the Northern Prawn Fishery (NPF) but only in small numbers following the mandatory adoption of Turtle Exclusion Devices (TEDs). As a result, the IUCN assessment for the Australian population is Least Concern. Globally, the IUCN has listed this species as Vulnerable.
