= Uterine gland =

Structure in the uterus

Uterine glands
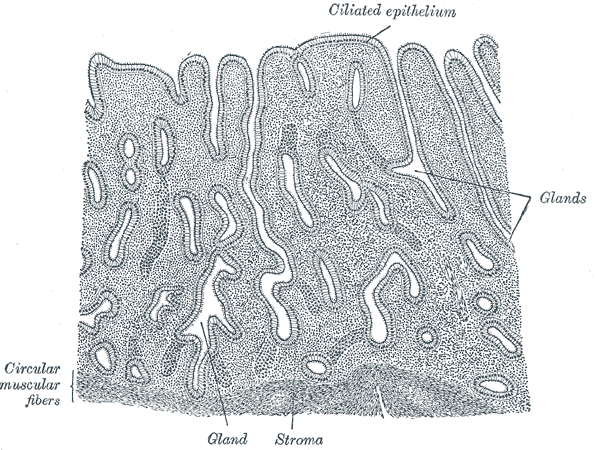
- Vertical section of mucous membrane of human uterus. (Glands labeled at center right.)

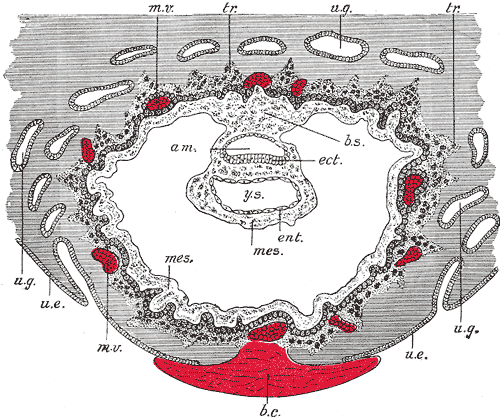
- Diagrammatic section through an implanted blastocyst in the endometrium showing uterine glands ug.

Details

Identifiers
- Latin: glandulae uterinae
- TA98: A09.1.03.028
- TA2: 3522
- FMA: 71647

Uterine glands or endometrial glands are tubular glands, lined by a simple columnar epithelium, found in the functional layer of the endometrium that lines the uterus. Their appearance varies during the menstrual cycle. During the proliferative phase, uterine glands appear long due to estrogen secretion by the ovaries. During the secretory phase, the uterine glands become very coiled with wide lumens and produce a glycogen-rich secretion known as histotroph or uterine milk. This change corresponds with an increase in blood flow to spiral arteries due to increased progesterone secretion from the corpus luteum. During the pre-menstrual phase, progesterone secretion decreases as the corpus luteum degenerates, which results in decreased blood flow to the spiral arteries. The functional layer of the uterus containing the glands becomes necrotic, and eventually sloughs off during the menstrual phase of the cycle.

They are of small size in the unimpregnated uterus, but shortly after impregnation become enlarged and elongated, presenting a contorted or waved appearance.

== Function ==
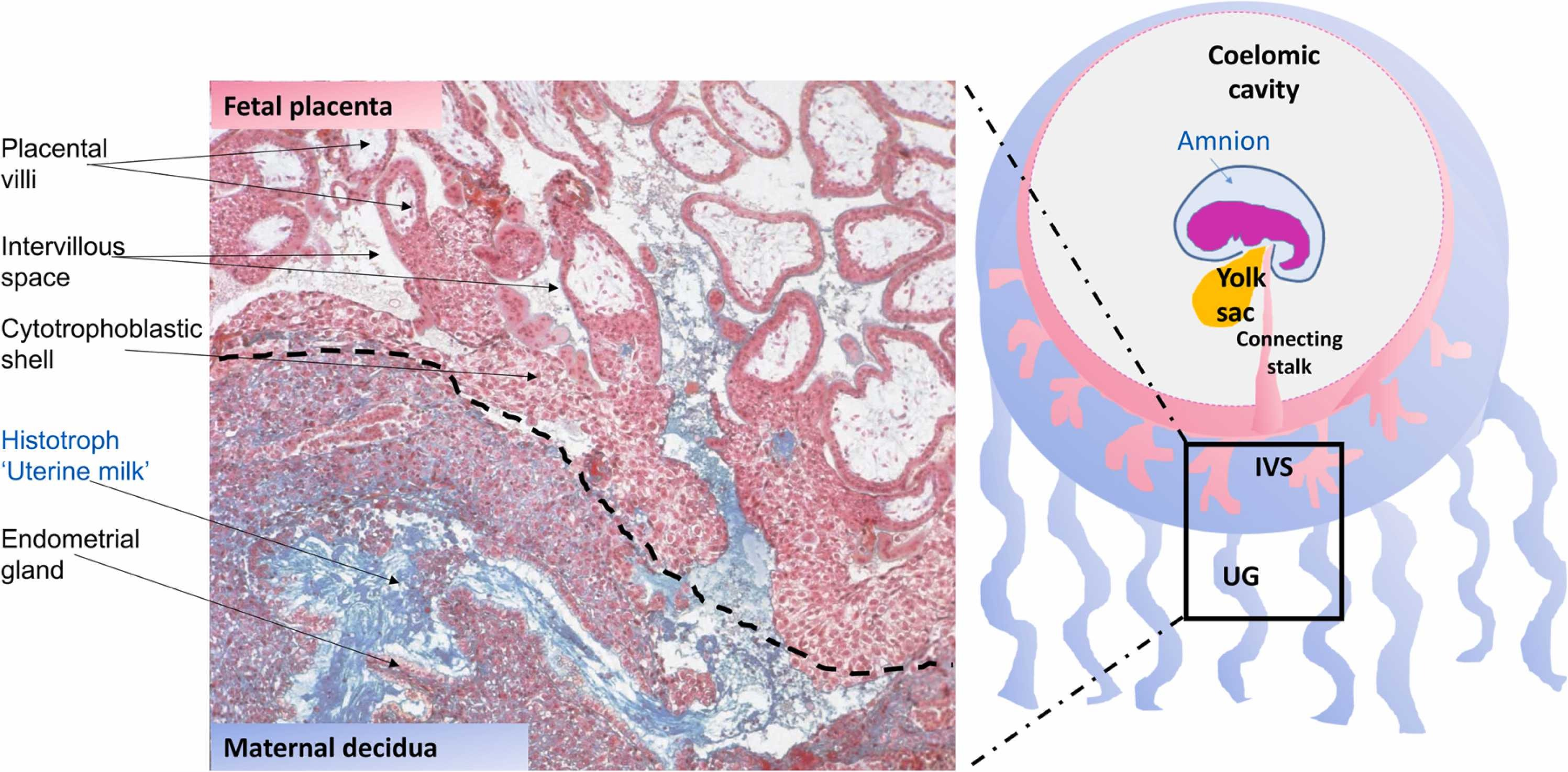
Fetal-maternal interface showing uterine milk

Hormones produced in early pregnancy stimulate the uterine glands to secrete a number of substances to give nutrition and protection to the embryo and fetus, and the fetal membranes. These secretions are known as histiotroph, alternatively histotroph, and also as uterine milk. Important uterine milk proteins are glycodelin-A and osteopontin.

Some secretory components from the uterine glands are taken up by the secondary yolk sac lining the exocoelomic cavity during pregnancy, and may thereby assist in providing fetal nutrition.

== Additional images ==
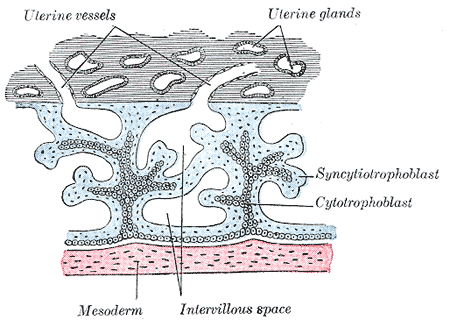
Primary chorionic villi. Diagrammatic.

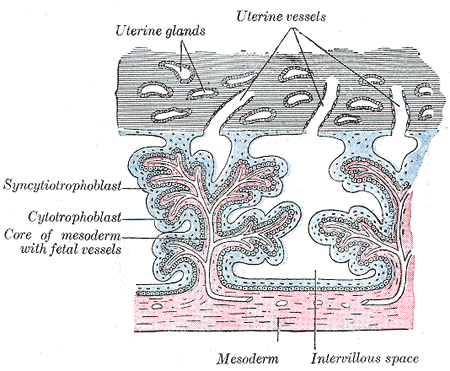
Secondary chorionic villi. Diagrammatic.
