= Onchobothriidae =

Scientific classification
- Kingdom: Animalia
- Phylum: Platyhelminthes
- Class: Cestoda
- Order: Tetraphyllidea
- Family: Onchobothriidae; Braun, 1900

Family of flatworms

Onchobothriidae is a family of flatworms belonging to the order Onchoproteocephalidea.

== Genera ==
Genera:

- Acanthobothrium Blanchard, 1848
- Acanthobothroides Brooks, 1977
- Cylindrophorus Diesing, 1863
- Megalonchos Baer & Euzet, 1962
- Onchobothrium de Blainville, 1828
- Pedibothrium Linton, 1908
- Phoreiobothrium Linton, 1889
- Pinguicollum Riser, 1955
- Platybothrium Linton, 1890
- Potamotrygonocestus Brooks & Thorson, 1976
- Triloculatum Caira & Jensen, 2009
- Uncibilocularis Southwell, 1925
