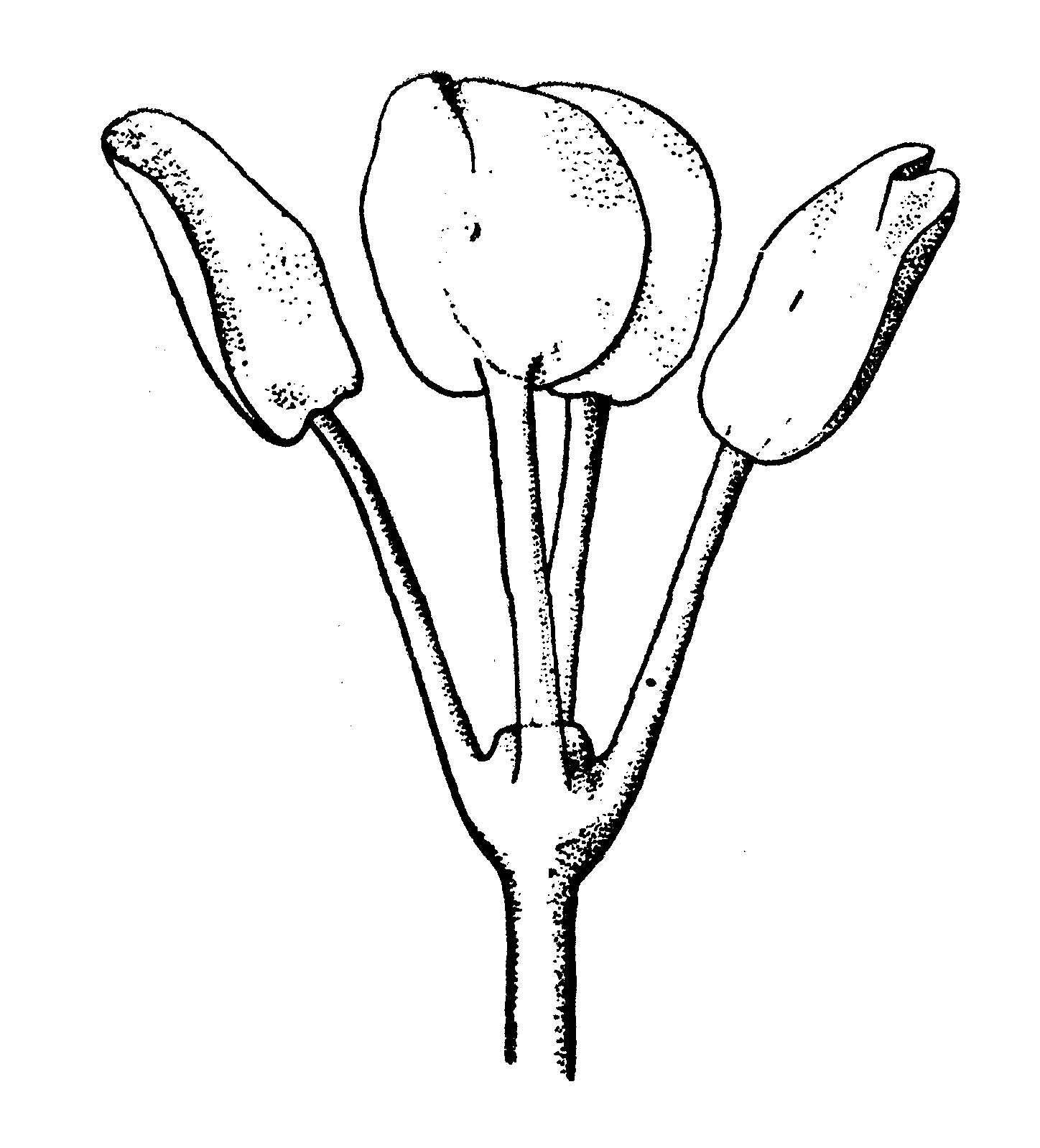
- Scolex of a tetraphyllid

Scientific classification
- Kingdom: Animalia
- Phylum: Platyhelminthes
- Class: Cestoda
- Subclass: Eucestoda
- Order: Tetraphyllidea; Carus, 1863

Families
- Balanobothriidae Pintner, 1928; Calliobothriidae Perrier, 1897; Dioecotaeniidae Schmidt, 1969; Gastrolecithidae; Rhoptrobothriidae Caira, Jensen & Ruhnke, 2017; Serendipeidae Brooks & Barriga, 1995; Shindeobothriiidae Shinde & Chincholikar, 1975; Triloculariidae Yamaguti, 1959

= Tetraphyllidea =

Order of flatworms

Tetraphyllidea is a large tapeworm order that contains some 60 genera and about 800 described species. Tetraphyllideans are remarkable for their scolex morphologies, which are the most varied and morphologically complex amongst all tapeworm orders.

Tetraphyllidean cestodes also exhibit a remarkable degree of host specificity. The procercoid probably parasitizes copepods, which are eaten by the second intermediate hosts: teleost fishes, decapods or cephalopods, which may also serve as paratenic hosts. The verified definite hosts are sharks, skates and stingrays. Occasionally found in cetaceans, the role of these apex predators in the tetraphyllidean life cycle is not well known; whales and dolphins may be definite or dead-end hosts.

Crossobothrium antonioi is a recently discovered species in the genus Crossobothrium, which belongs to the order Tetraphyllidea. It is a parasitic tapeworm that infects Notorynchus cepedianus, the broadnose sevengill shark. C. antonioi was discovered off the coast of Buenos Aires Province, Argentina. C. antonioi was recovered from the spiral intestine of N. cepedianus and named after the lead researcher's father, Antonio Ivanov. C. antonioi is the smallest species in its genus and about 47.4-51.5 mm long; other species in the genus are about twice as long as C. antonioi. It has 4 stalked bothridia ("sucking grooves") on its scolex. Its proglottids, which are the segments of tapeworms that contain the reproductive structures, are longer than wide when immature, and become wider than long at maturity. However, the proglottids at each stage are generally the same shape. C. antonioi also have crenulated bothridial margins and a microthrix pattern that varies from other species in Crossobothrium. The most notable and unique quality of C. antonioi is the large amount of testes per mature proglottid. C. antonioi has more than 700 testes per proglottid, whereas other Crossobothrium species have ~150-300 testes per proglottid.
