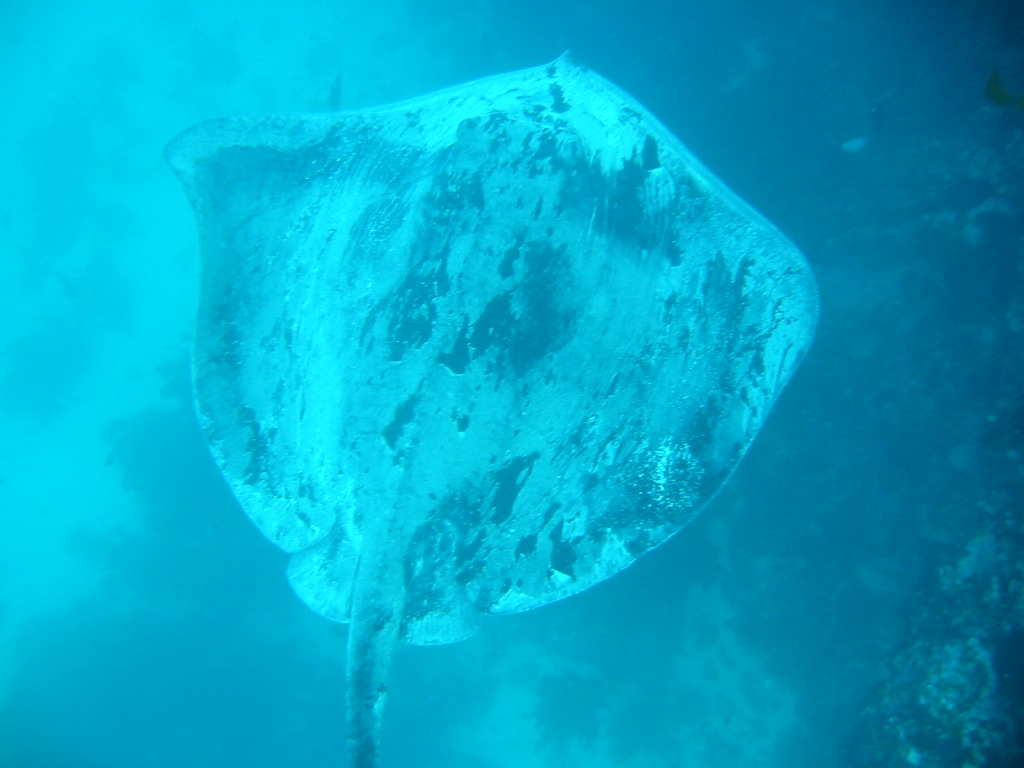
- B. lata

Scientific classification
- Kingdom: Animalia
- Phylum: Chordata
- Class: Chondrichthyes
- Subclass: Elasmobranchii
- Order: Myliobatiformes
- Family: Dasyatidae
- Subfamily: Dasyatinae
- Genus: Bathytoshia; Whitley, 1933

Type species
- Dasyatis thetidis Ogilby, 1899

= Bathytoshia =

Genus of cartilaginous fishes

Bathytoshia is a genus of stingrays in the family Dasyatidae found worldwide in tropical and warm temperate oceans (except the East Pacific and tropical Indian Ocean). It was formerly regarded as a junior synonym of the genus Dasyatis.

== Species ==
Molecular phylogenetic data indicate that several previously recognized Dasyatis species are in fact populations of wider-ranging Bathytoshia species.

Image	Scientific name	Distribution
	Bathytoshia brevicaudata (F. W. Hutton, 1875) (including Dasyatis matsubarai and D. multispinosa) (Smooth Stingray)	from southern Africa to Hawaii
	Bathytoshia centroura (Mitchill, 1815) (Roughtail Stingray)	northwestern and southwestern Atlantic Ocean
	Bathytoshia lata (Garman, 1880) (including D. thetidis, D. ushiei, and eastern Atlantic B. centroura) (Broad Stingray)	southern Africa,
