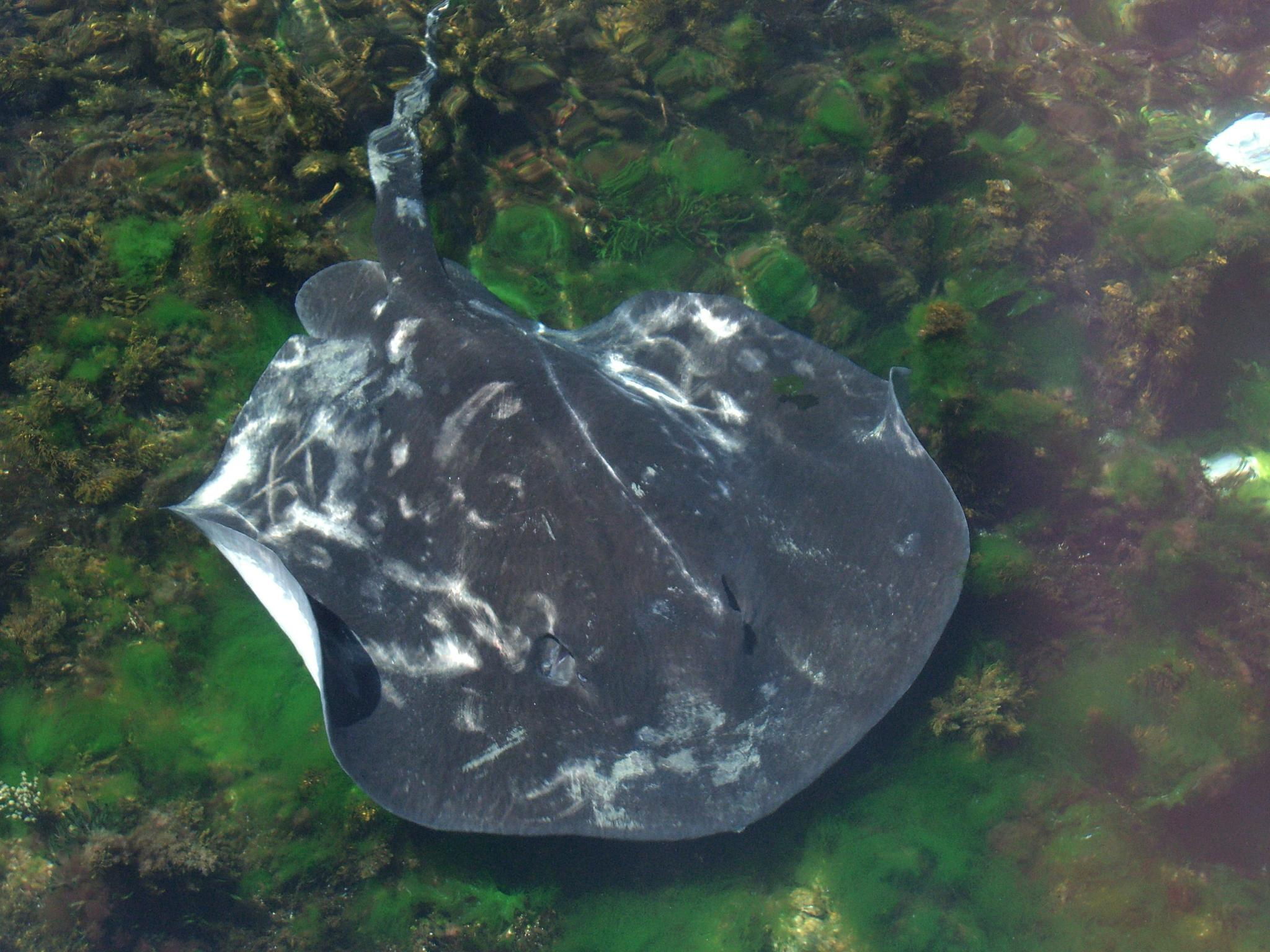

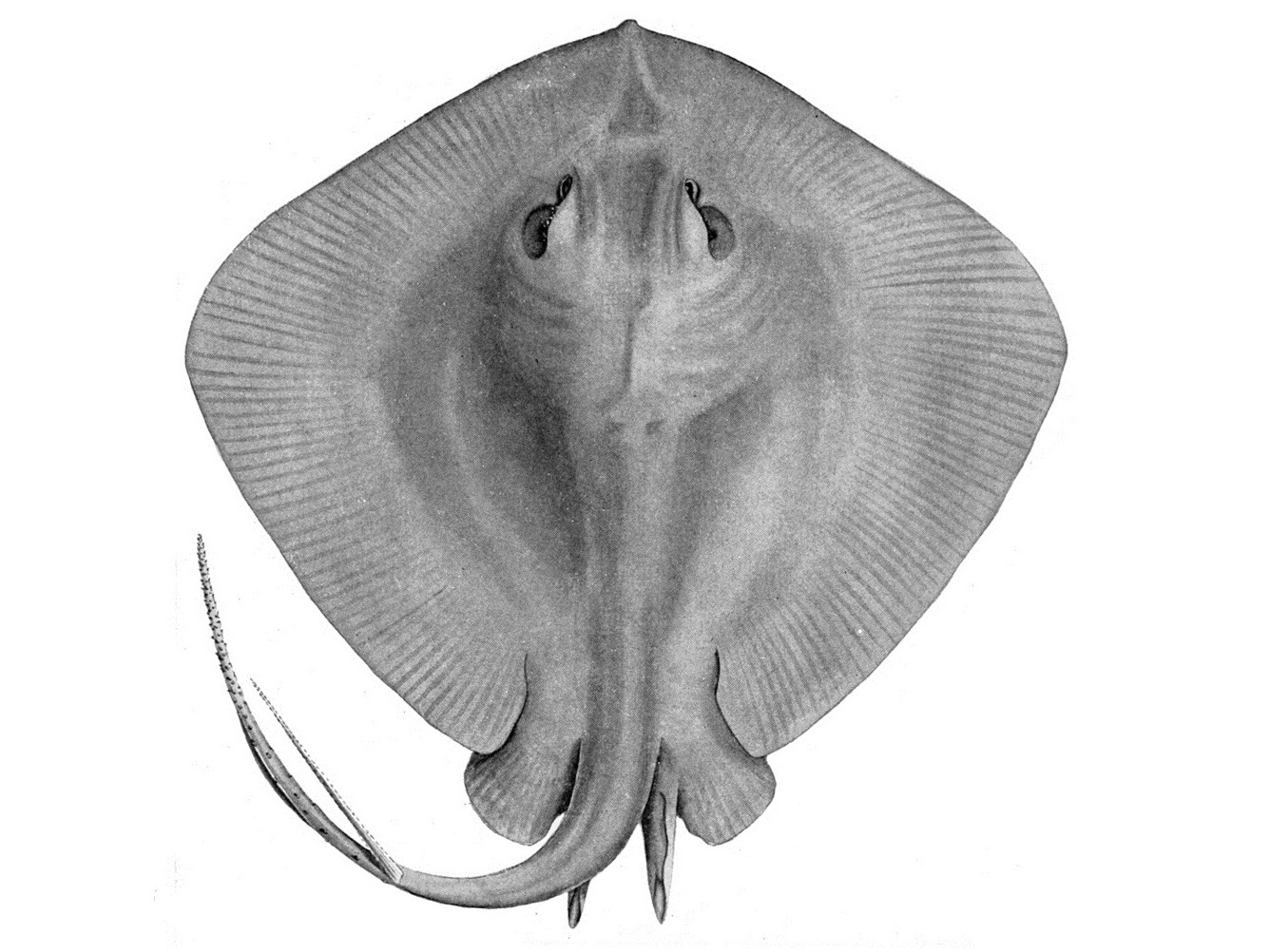

Conservation status
- Least Concern (IUCN 3.1)

Scientific classification
- Kingdom: Animalia
- Phylum: Chordata
- Class: Chondrichthyes
- Subclass: Elasmobranchii
- Order: Myliobatiformes
- Family: Dasyatidae
- Subfamily: Dasyatinae
- Genus: Bathytoshia
- Species: B. brevicaudata

Binomial name
- Bathytoshia brevicaudata (F. W. Hutton, 1875)
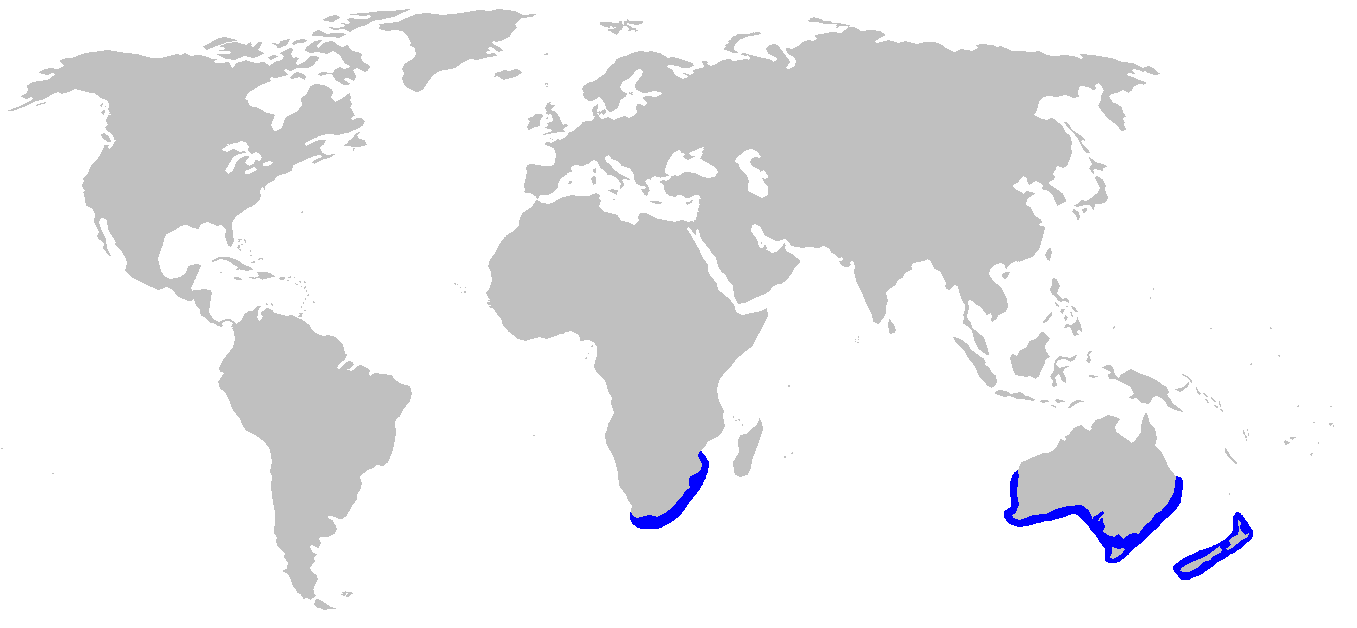
- Range of the short-tail stingray

Synonyms
- Trygon brevicaudata F. W. Hutton, 1875; Trygon schreineri Gilchrist, 1913; Dasyatis matsubarai Miyosi, 1939

= Short-tail stingray =

Species of cartilaginous fish

The short-tail stingray or smooth stingray (Bathytoshia brevicaudata) is a common species of stingray in the family Dasyatidae. It occurs off southern Africa, typically offshore at a depth of 180–480 m (590–1,570 ft), and off southern Australia and New Zealand, from the intertidal zone to a depth of 156 m (512 ft). It is mostly bottom-dwelling in nature and can be found across a range of habitats from estuaries to reefs, but also frequently will swim into open water. One of the largest stingrays in the world, this heavy-bodied species can grow upwards of 2.1 m (6.9 ft) across and 350 kg (770 lb) in weight. Its plain-colored, diamond-shaped pectoral fin disc is characterized by a lack of dermal denticles (scales) even in adults, and white pores beside the head on either side. The body can have colors as well as dark grey or black with rows of white spots along each wing. Its tail is usually shorter than the disc and thick at the base. It is armed with large tubercles and a midline row of large thorns in front of the stinging spine which has the dorsal and ventral fin folds behind.

The diet of the short-tail stingray consists of invertebrates and bony fishes, including burrowing and midwater species. It tends to remain within a relatively limited area throughout the year, preferring deeper waters during the winter, and is not known to perform long migrations. Large aggregations of rays form seasonally at certain locations, such as in the summer at the Poor Knight Islands off New Zealand. Both birthing and mating have been documented within the aggregations at Poor Knights. This species is aplacental viviparous, with the developing embryos sustained by histotroph ("uterine milk") produced by the mother. The litter size is typically 6 –10, but litter sizes of up to fifteen are not unheard of.

The short-tail stingray is not aggressive, but is capable of inflicting a lethal wound with its long, venomous sting. It is often caught incidentally by commercial and recreational fisheries throughout its range, usually surviving to be released. Because its population does not appear threatened by human activity, the International Union for Conservation of Nature (IUCN) lists it under least concern.

== Taxonomy ==
The original description of the short-tail stingray was made by Frederick Hutton, curator of the Otago Museum, from a female specimen 1.2 m (3.9 ft) across caught off Dunedin in New Zealand. He published his account in an 1875 issue of the scientific journal Annals and Magazine of Natural History, in which he named the new species Trygon brevicaudata, derived from the Latin brevis ("short") and cauda ("tail"). Although long assigned to Dasyatis, recent work by Last et al. (2016) resurrected Bathytoshia for it and the broad stingray, as well as the roughtail stingray. The short-tail stingray may also be referred to as giant black ray, giant stingray, New Zealand short-tail stingray, Schreiners ray, short-tailed stingaree, shorttail black stingray, and smooth short-tailed stingray. It is closely related to the similar-looking but smaller pitted stingray (Dasyatis matsubarai) of the northwestern Pacific. A review based on Molecular phylogenetic data in 2016 added Dasyatis matsubarai and Dasyatis multispinosa as populations of this species.

== Description ==
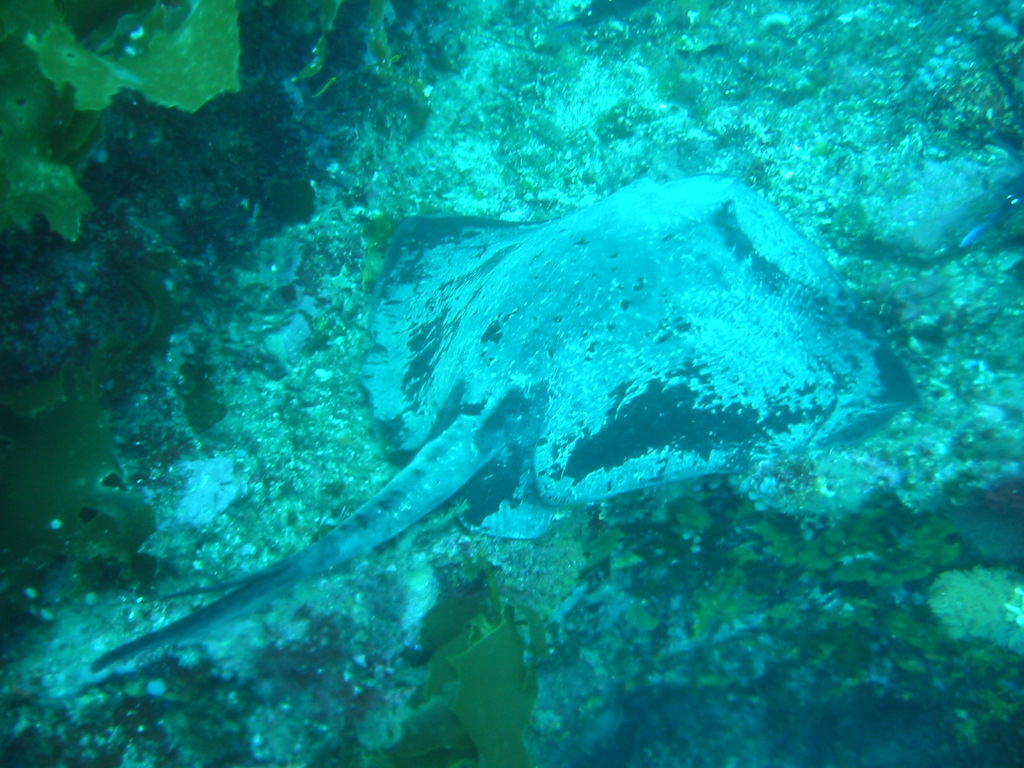
As its name suggests, tail length is an identifying trait of the short-tail stingray.

Heavily built and characteristically smooth, the pectoral fin disc of the short-tail stingray has a rather angular, rhomboid shape and is slightly wider than long. The leading margins of the disc are very gently convex, and converge on a blunt, broadly triangular snout. The eyes are small and immediately followed by much larger spiracles. The widely spaced nostrils are long and narrow; between them is a short, skirt-shaped curtain of skin with a fringed posterior margin. The modestly sized mouth has an evenly arched lower jaw, prominent grooves at the corners, and five to seven papillae (nipple-like structures) on the floor. Additional, tiny papillae are scattered on the nasal curtain and outside the lower jaw. Short-tailed stingrays have between 45–55 densely arranged teeth, which are small, blunt, and conical. The teeth are arranged in a gridded, quincunx pattern, and have a flat, planar appearance. The pelvic fins are somewhat large and rounded at the tips.

The tail is usually shorter than the disc and has one, sometimes two, serrated stinging spines on the upper surface, about halfway along its length. It is broad and flattened until the base of the sting; after, it tapers rapidly and a prominent ventral fin fold runs almost to the sting tip, as well as a low dorsal ridge. Dermal denticles are only found on the tail, with at least one thorn appearing on the tail base by a disc width of 45 cm (18 in). Adults have a midline row of large, backward-pointing, spear-like thorns or flattened tubercles in front of the sting, as well as much smaller, conical thorns behind the sting covering the tail to the tip. The dorsal coloration is grayish brown, darkening towards the tip of the tail and above the eyes, with a line of white pores flanking the head on either side. The underside is whitish, darkening towards the fin margins and beneath the tail. Albino individuals have been reported. The short-tail stingray is the largest stingray species, known to reach at least 2.1 m (6.9 ft) in width, 4.3 m (14 ft) in length, and 350 kg (770 lb) in weight. Reliable observers off New Zealand have reported sighting individuals almost 3 m (10 ft) across. Mature females are about a third larger than mature males.

== Distribution and habitat ==
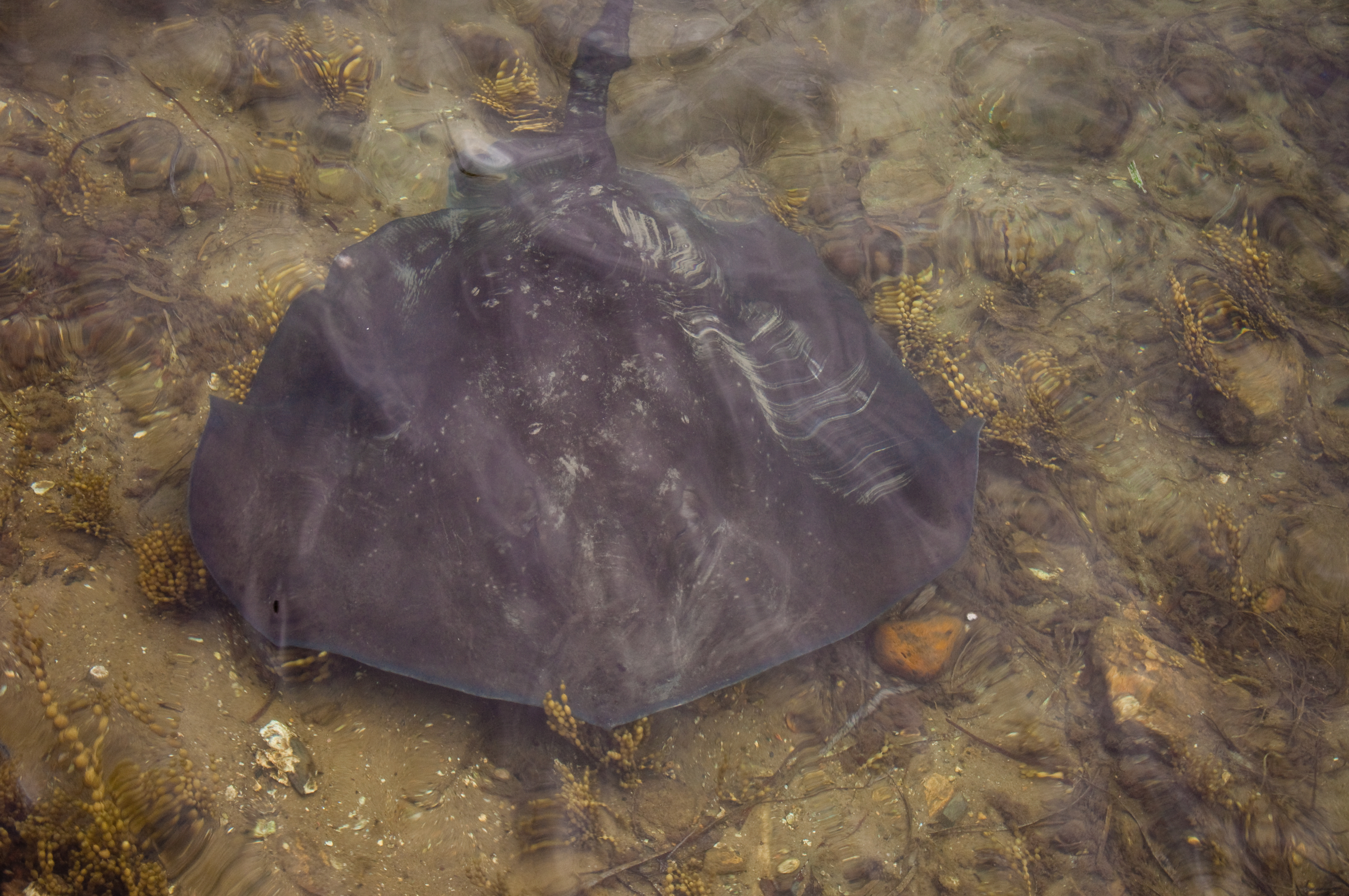
Off Australia and New Zealand, the short-tail stingray was common in shallow coastal waters.

The short-tail stingray is common and widely distributed in the temperate waters of the Southern Hemisphere. Off southern Africa, it has been reported from Cape Town in South Africa to the mouth of the Zambezi River in Mozambique. Along the southern Australian coast, it is found from Shark Bay in Western Australia to Maroochydore in Queensland, including Tasmania. In New Zealand waters, it occurs off North Island and the Chatham Islands, and rarely off South Island and the Kermadec Islands. Records from northern Australia and Thailand likely represent misidentifications of pink whipray and pitted stingray, respectively. Over the past few decades, its range and numbers off southeastern Tasmania have grown, possibly as a result of climate change.

Off southern Africa, the short-tail stingray is rare in shallow water and is most often found over offshore banks at a depth of 180 to 480 m (590 to 1,570 ft). However, off Australia and New Zealand, it was found from the intertidal zone to no deeper than 156 m (512 ft). Australian and New Zealand rays were most abundant in the shallows during the summer. A tracking study conducted on two New Zealand rays suggests that they shifted to deeper waters during the winter, but did not undertake long-distance migrations. The short-tail stingray is mainly bottom-dwelling in nature, inhabiting a variety of environments including brackish estuaries, sheltered bays and inlets, sandy flats, rocky reefs, and the outer continental shelf. However, it also makes regular forays upward into the middle of the water column.

== Biology and ecology ==
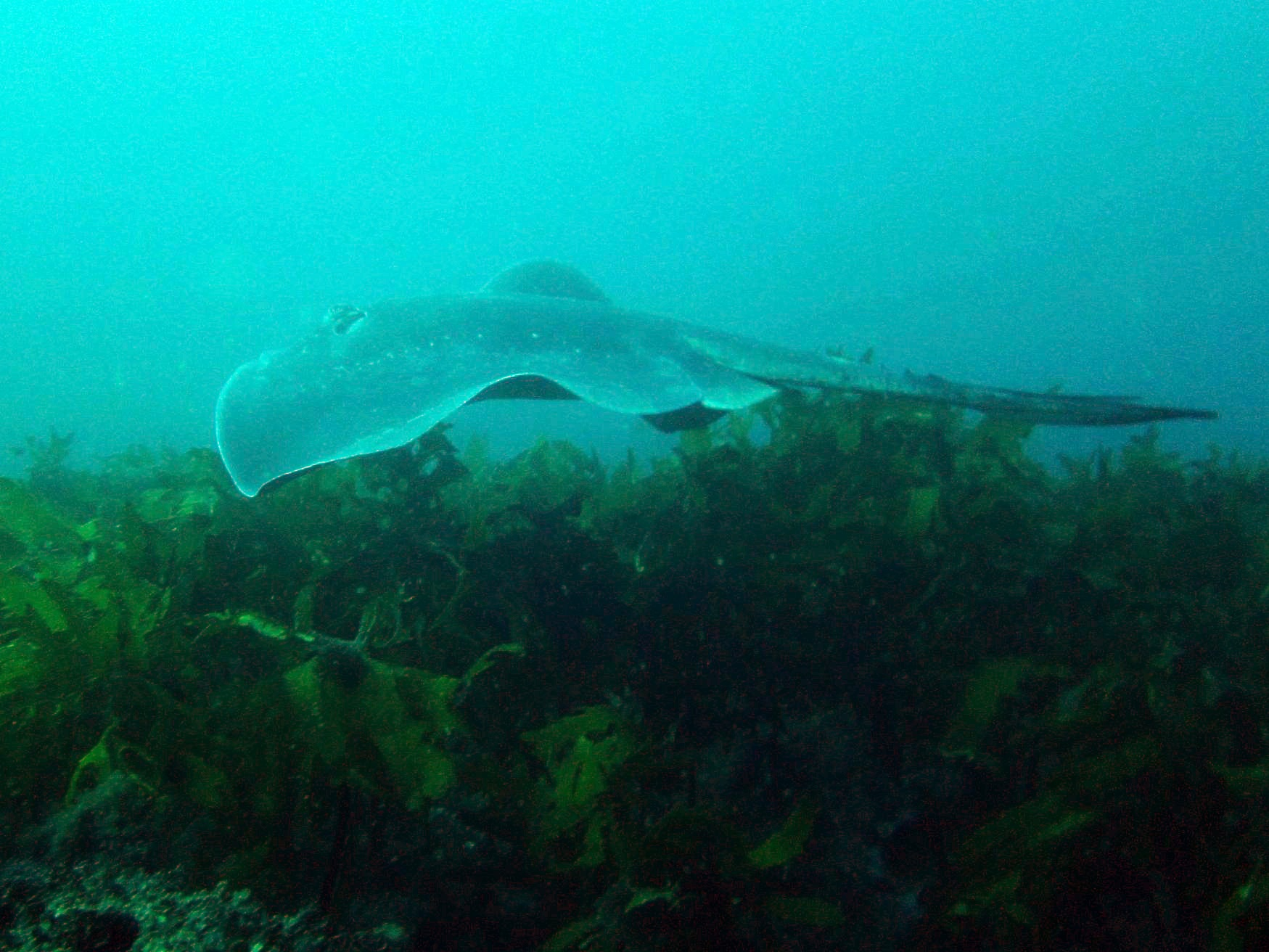
The short-tail stingray mainly forages for food on or near the bottom.

The short-tail stingray is usually slow-moving, but can achieve sudden bursts of speed, flapping its pectoral fins with enough force to cavitate the water and create an audible "bang". Cavitation is when a liquid is pushed faster that it can react, causing a drop in pressure. It is known to form large seasonal aggregations; a well-known example occurs every summer (January to April) at the Poor Knights Islands off New Zealand, particularly under the rocky archways. In some areas, it moves with the rising tide into very shallow water. Individual rays tend to stay inside a relatively small home range with a radius of under 25 km (16 mi). Captive experiments have shown it capable of detecting magnetic fields via its electroreceptive ampullae of Lorenzini, which in nature may be employed for navigation.

The short-tail stingray forages for food both during the day and at night. It feeds primarily on benthic bony fishes and invertebrates, such as molluscs and crustaceans. The lateral line system on its underside allows it to detect the minute water jets produced by buried bivalves and spoon worms, which are then extracted by suction; the excess water is expelled through the spiracles. Fishes and invertebrates from open water, including salps and hyperiid amphipods, are also eaten in significant quantities. Off South Africa, this ray has been observed patrolling the egg beds of the chokka squid (Loligo vulgaris reynaudii) during mass spawnings, capturing squid that descend to the bottom to spawn. The short-tail stingray has few predators due to its size; these included the copper shark, the smooth hammerhead, the great white shark, and the killer whale. When threatened, it raises its tail warningly over its back like a scorpion. Smaller fishes have been observed using swimming rays for cover while hunting their own prey. Known parasites of this species include the nematode Echinocephalus overstreeti, and the monogeneans Heterocotyle tokoloshei and Dendromonocotyle sp.

=== Life history ===
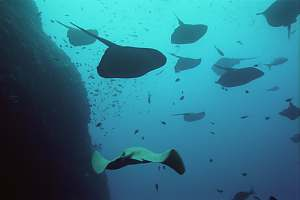
Short-tail stingrays gather every summer off the Poor Knights Islands, New Zealand.

The summer aggregations of the short-tail stingray at the Poor Knights Islands seem to at least partly serve a reproductive purpose, as both mating and birthing have been observed among the gathered rays. Courtship and mating takes place in midwater, and the rising current flowing continuously through the narrow archways is thought to aid the rays in maintaining their position. Each receptive female may be followed by several males, which attempt to bite and grip her disc. One or two males may be dragged by the female for hours before she accedes; the successful male flips upside down beneath her, inserting one of his claspers into her vent and rhythmically waving his tail from side to side. Copulation lasted 3–5 minutes. Females in captivity have been observed mating with up to three different males in succession.

Like other stingrays, the short-tail stingray was aplacental viviparous; once the developing embryos exhaust their yolk supply, they are provisioned with histotroph ("uterine milk", enriched with proteins, lipids, and mucus) produced by the mother and delivered through specialized extensions of the uterine epithelium called "trophonemata". Females bear litters of six to 10 pups in the summer; males appear to assist in the process by nudging the female's abdomen with their snouts. Females are ready to mate again shortly after giving birth. Newborns measure 32–36 cm (13–14 in) across.

== Human interactions ==
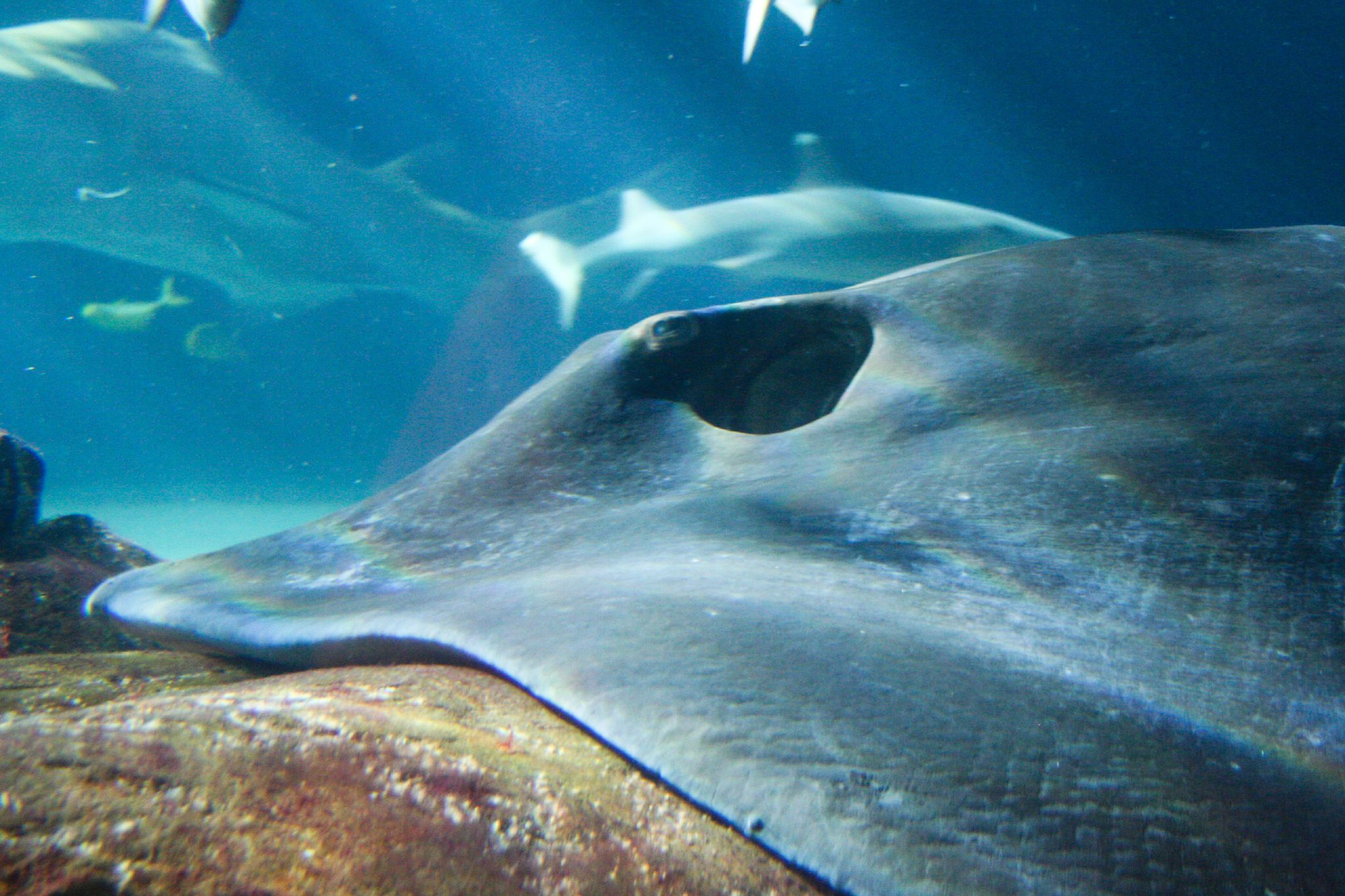
A short-tail stingray at the Sydney Aquarium

Curious and unaggressive, the short-tail stingray may approach humans and can be trained to be hand-fed. At Hamelin Bay in Western Australia, many short-tail stingrays, thorntail stingrays, and New Zealand eagle rays regularly gather to be hand-fed fish scraps; the number of visitors has steadily increased in recent years, and interest exists in developing the site as a permanent tourist attraction. However, if startled or harassed, this species is capable of inflicting a serious, even fatal wound with its sting. The sting can measure over 30 cm (12 in) long and can penetrate most types of footwear, including kevlar bootees, and its mucous sheath contains a toxin that causes necrosis. The most dangerous injuries involve damage to a vital organ, massive blood loss, and/or secondary sepsis or tetanus. A startled ray is also able to leap through water, and inflict injuries with its tail. This species is responsible for the majority of stingray injuries off New Zealand, the most famous incident of which was the death of Australian naturalist Steve Irwin when a stingray pierced his chest with its barbed tail.

Throughout its range, the short-tail stingray is caught incidentally by various commercial fisheries using trawls, Danish and purse seines, longlines and set lines, and drag and set nets. Sport fishers occasionally keep captured rays for meat or angling competitions; a few are also kept for display in public aquariums, and they reproduce in captivity. As it survives fishing activities well and remained common throughout its range, the International Union for Conservation of Nature (IUCN) has assessed the short-tail stingray as least concern. Within most of this species' range off New Zealand, targeting it commercially is prohibited. In June 2018 the New Zealand Department of Conservation classified the short-tail stingray as "Not Threatened" with the qualifier "Secure Overseas" under the New Zealand Threat Classification System.
