= Multispine giant stingray =

Conservation status
- Data Deficient (IUCN 3.1)

Scientific classification
- Kingdom: Animalia
- Phylum: Chordata
- Class: Chondrichthyes
- Subclass: Elasmobranchii
- Order: Myliobatiformes
- Family: Dasyatidae
- Genus: Dasyatis
- Species: D. multispinosa

Binomial name
- Dasyatis multispinosa (Tokarev, 1959)

Synonyms
- Urolophoides multispinosus Tokarev, 1959

Species of cartilaginous fish

The multispine giant stingray, Dasyatis multispinosa is a species of stingray in the family Dasyatidae. Some authors regard this species as the same as the pitted stingray (D. matsubarai). This species is now regarded as a population of the Short-tail stingray (Bathytoshia brevicaudata).
