= Maui Ocean Center =

Aquarium and oceanography center in Maalaea, Hawaii, United States

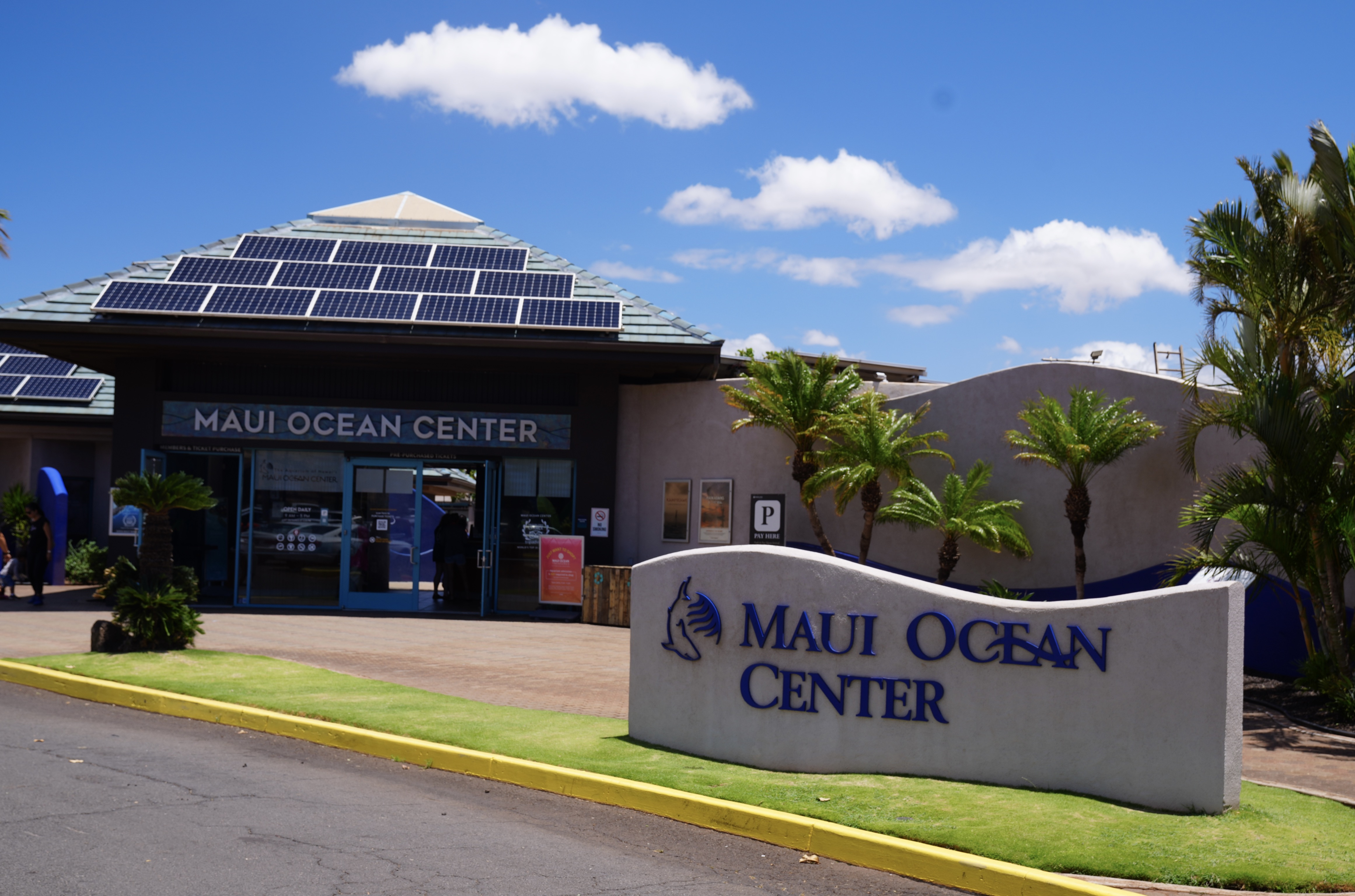
- Main Entrance
- Interactive map of Maui Ocean Center
- 20°47′33″N 156°30′44″W
- Date opened: 1998
- Location: Maalaea, Hawaii, United States
- Land area: 3 acres (1.2 ha)
- Volume of largest tank: 750,000 US gal (2,800,000 L)
- Memberships: Sustainable Tourism Association of Hawaii
- Management: Tapani Vuori (General Manager)
- Website: mauioceancenter.com

The Maui Ocean Center is an aquarium and oceanography center located in Maalaea, Hawaii, on the island of Maui. Opened on March 13, 1998, by Coral World International, the 3-acre (1.2 ha) facility is the largest living tropical reef aquarium in the Western Hemisphere. Their exhibits include colorful displays of live coral reef habitats, diverse collections of endemic Hawaiian fish species, and up-close viewing of sea turtles, stingrays, sharks, and various sea creatures.

Maui Ocean Center is the only public aquarium on Maui and exclusively displays marine life found in Hawaiian waters. The SEASCAPE restaurant at the aquarium is unique in that the restaurant is the only restaurant in all of Hawaii to be platinum certified for sustainability due to the restaurant offering 100% sustainable dining.

== Exhibits ==
Maui Ocean Center has six main exhibits that focus on reef fish, deep water animals, Hawaiian culture and history, and more.

=== Living Reef ===
The Living Reef exhibit showcases over 40 Hawaiian coral species that range from shallow to deep-reef environments. Guests can observe the changes in species and coloration of marine life as they journey from the shallow reef to mid reef, and eventually, the deep reef.

=== Turtle Lagoon ===
This exhibit is home to the Hawaiian green sea turtle, one of Earth's most ancient animals. Featuring both a surface and underwater view of Hawaiʻi's beloved honu (turtles), this exhibit has up to six sea turtles on display at all times.

Native to Hawaiʻi, the green sea turtle is the largest hard-shelled sea turtle in the world, reaching lengths of up to four feet and weighing in at over 300 pounds in adulthood.

=== Hawaiians and the Sea ===
This exhibit tells the stories of the kanaka maoli, Hawaiʻi's first people, and how they sailed across the Pacific in double-hulled canoes using the stars as guides.

== Living Coral Reefs ==
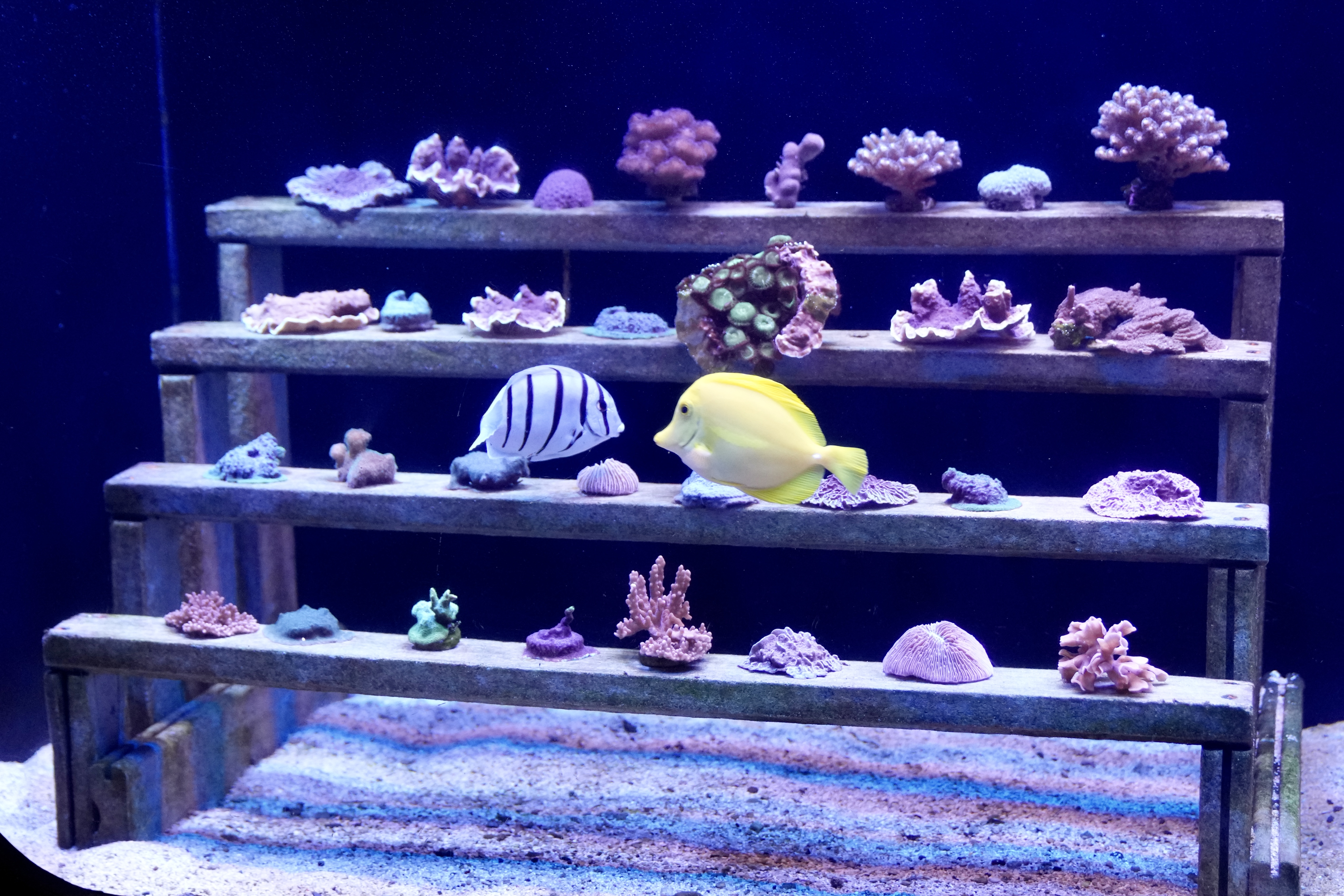
Coral restoration is one area of conservation of the center.

Maui Ocean Center has successfully raised and maintained coral colonies since 1998. Their exhibits receive saltwater directly from Māʻalaea Bay, resulting in environments that allow fish, corals, and other marine invertebrates to thrive.

=== Coral Restoration ===
MOCMI operates one of only four land-based coral nurseries in the United States and strives to protect all rare and endemic species of coral in Hawai῾i. In the case of widespread coral die-off, MOCMI's coral repository will provide a safe haven for corals of Hawaiʻi and currently the gene bank at the center holds the largest number of ocean corals in the world with active research leading to the discovery of new corals.

=== Sea Turtle Rescue ===
MOC Marine Institute (MOCMI) works in partnership with NOAA Fisheries to coordinate the response to sick, injured, distressed, or expired sea turtles on the island of Maui, Hawaiʻi. All MOCMI sea turtle stranding response and rescue activities authorized under NOAA Permit: 21260. Sea turtles are rehabilitated and released back to the ocean after they have received proper care.

== Criticism ==
The nonprofit organization For the Fishes has accused the Maui Ocean Center of repeatedly violating state-issued permits to take fish from the ocean. A compliance review by For the Fishes for the center's 2022-2023 special permit identified 91 instances of improper marine life removals, with a reported mortality rate of over 50% within one year of capture. During 2021-2022, the Maui Ocean Center collected 802 fish; by the end of the permit year, 548 (68%) had died and 14 (less than 2%) had been returned to the ocean. Despite these findings, the Division of Aquatic Resources renewed the aquarium's permit in June 2024, increasing the allowable fish take to 1,381 specimens - the largest such permit in the state of Hawaii - and adding an “opportunistic collection” clause that allows for subsequent permits to take unregulated marine life.

== Gallery ==
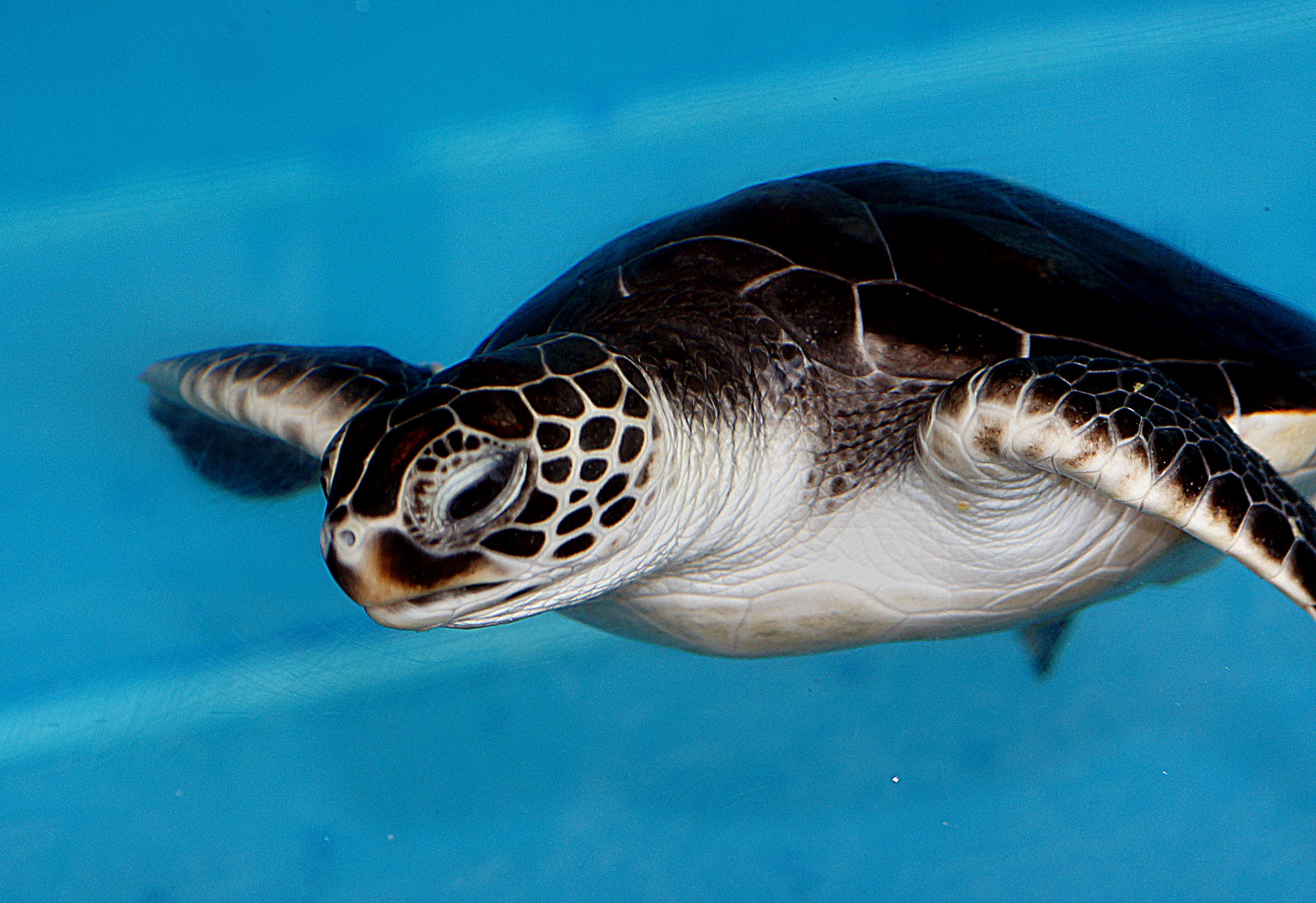
Baby Green Sea Turtle.

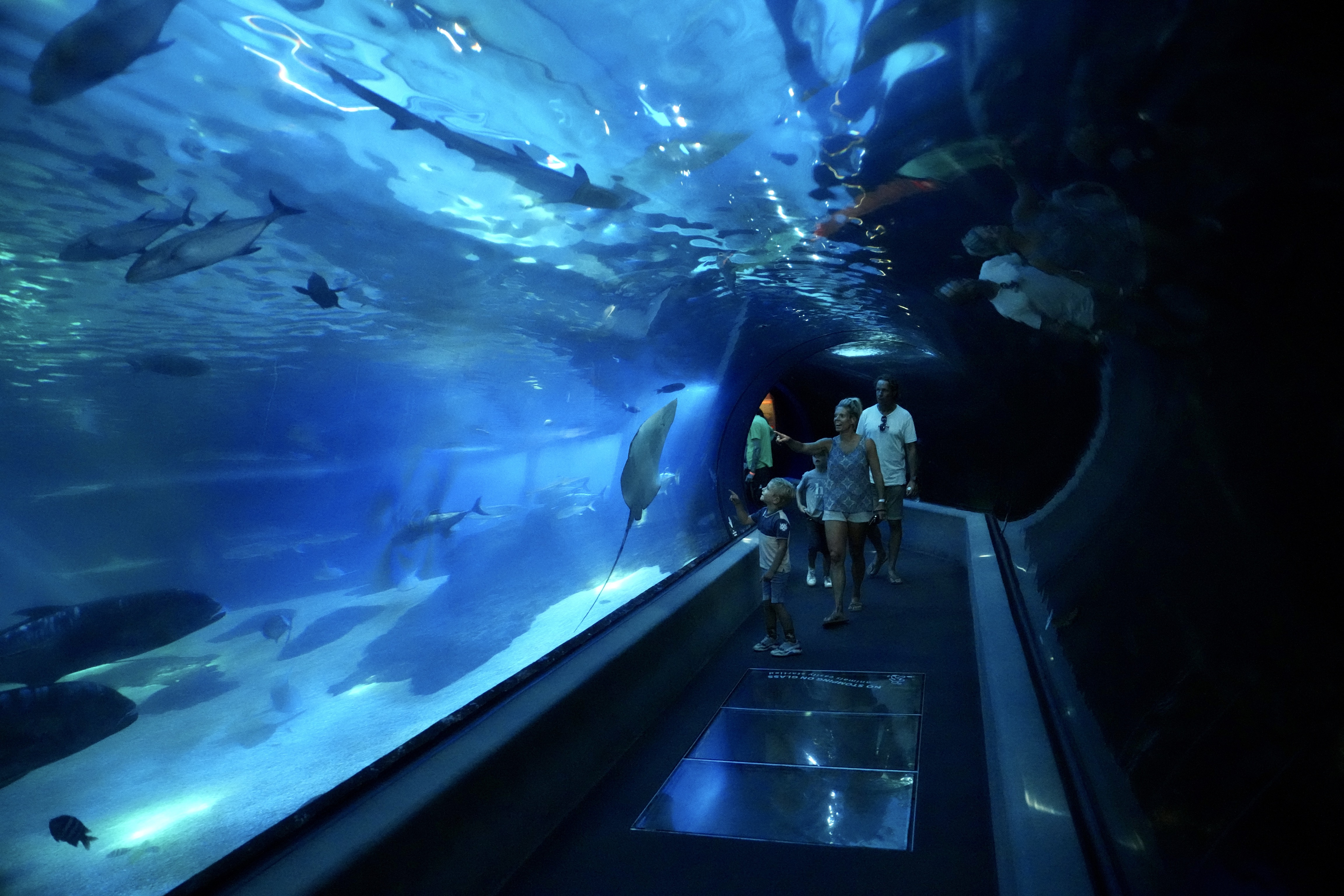
Tunnel through an aquarium.

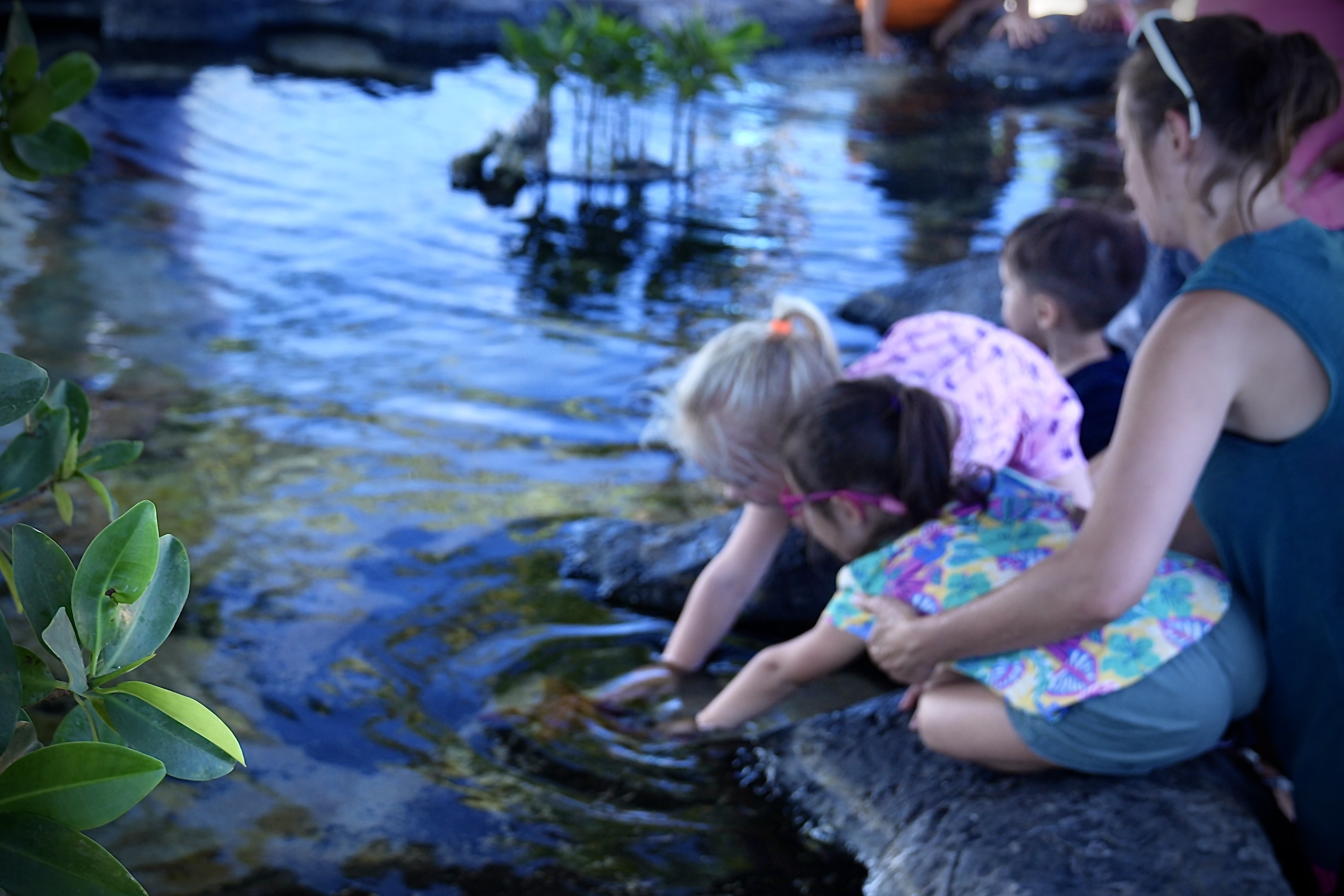
A touch pool.

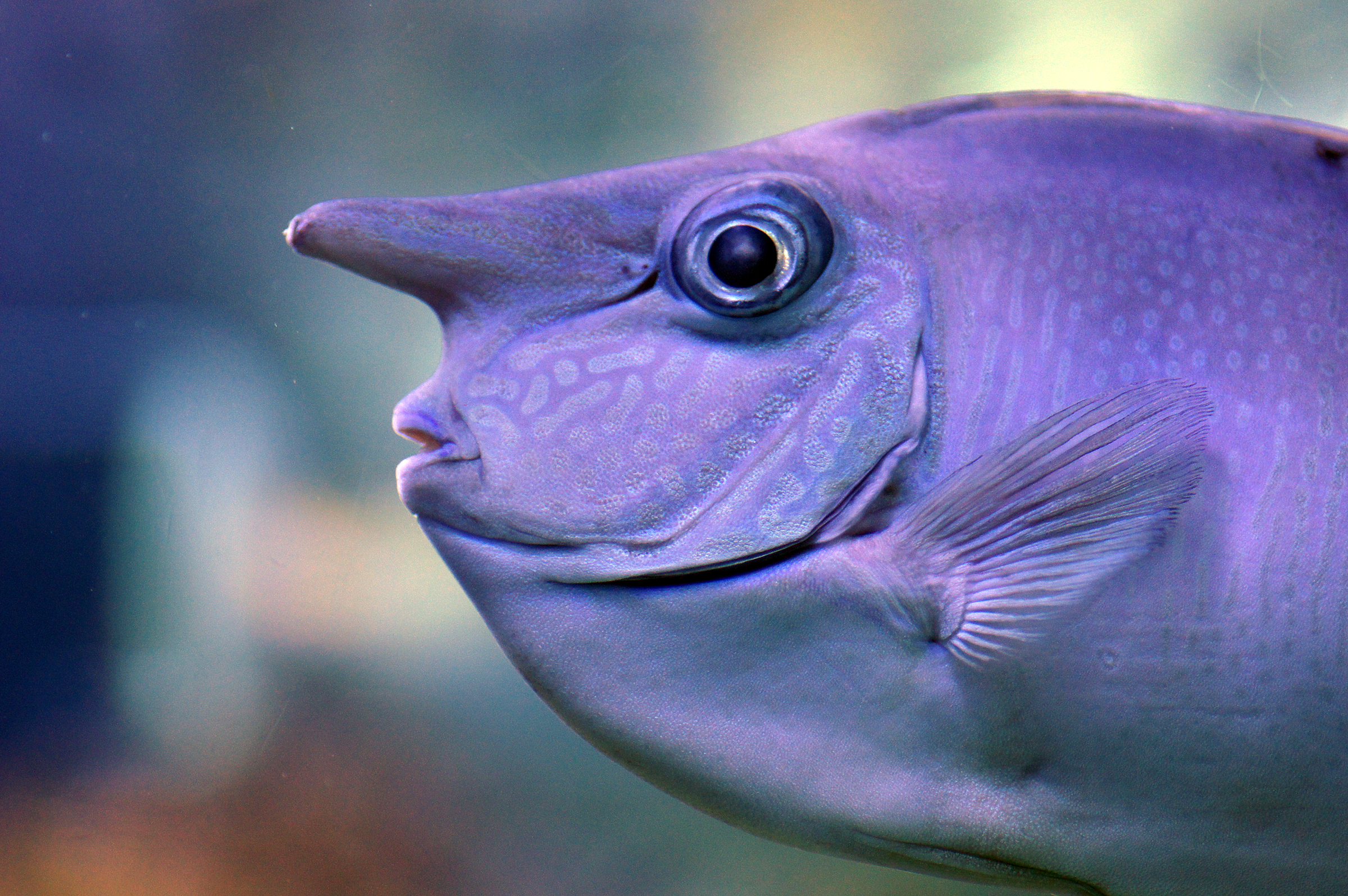
Whitemargin unicornfish (Naso annulatus).

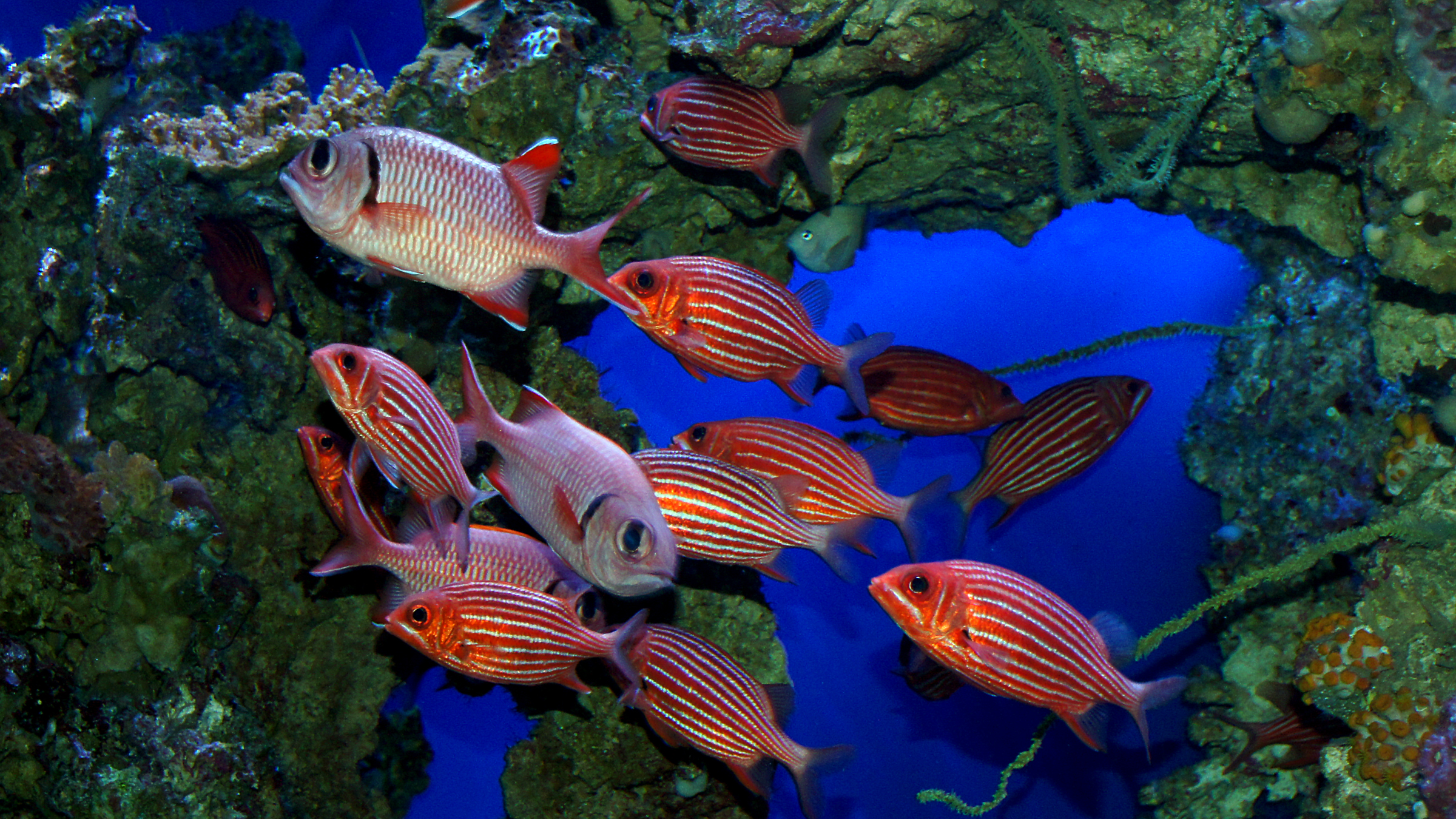
Hawaiian squirrelfish (Sargocentron xantherythrum)

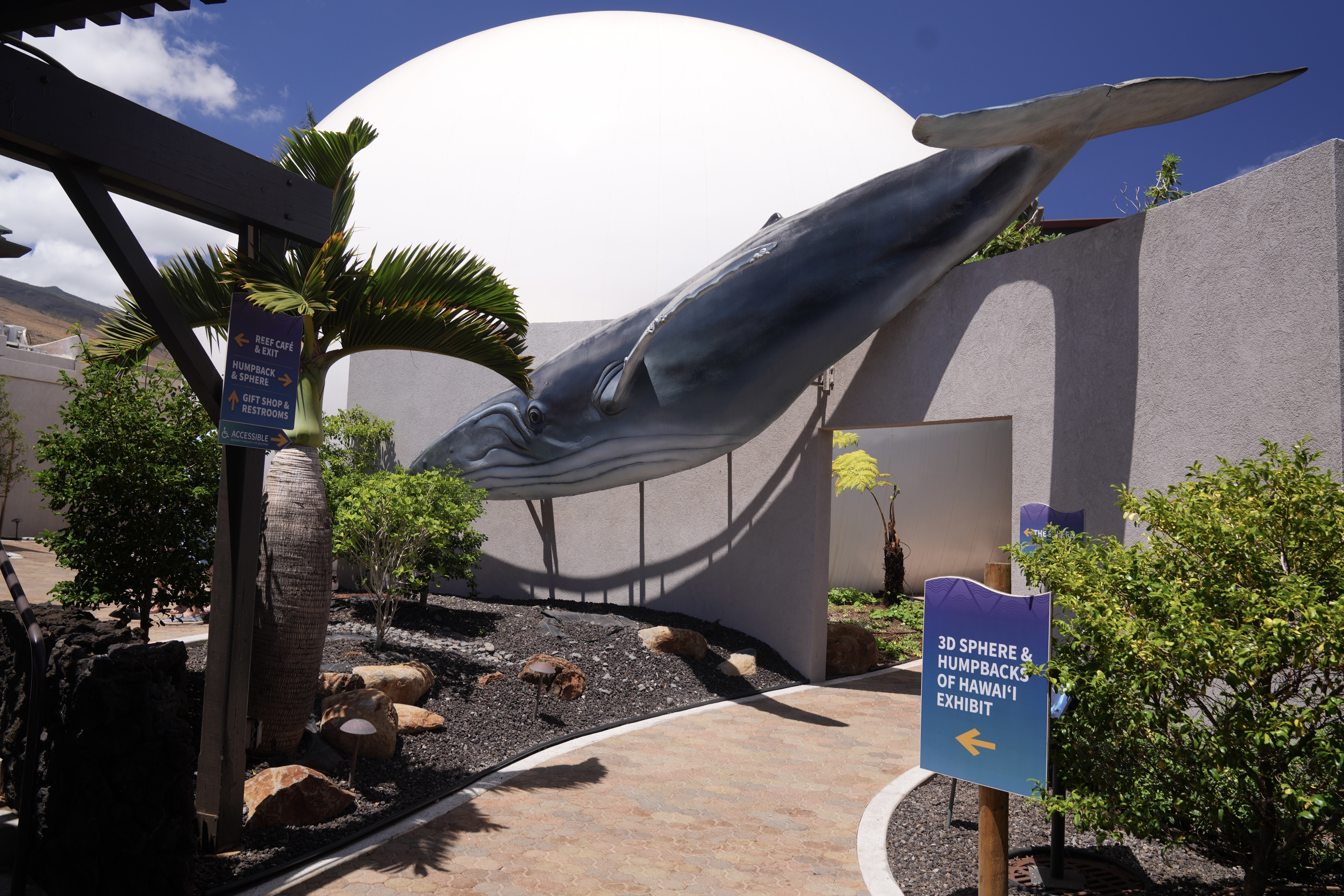
3D immersive exhibit about humpback whales of Hawaii

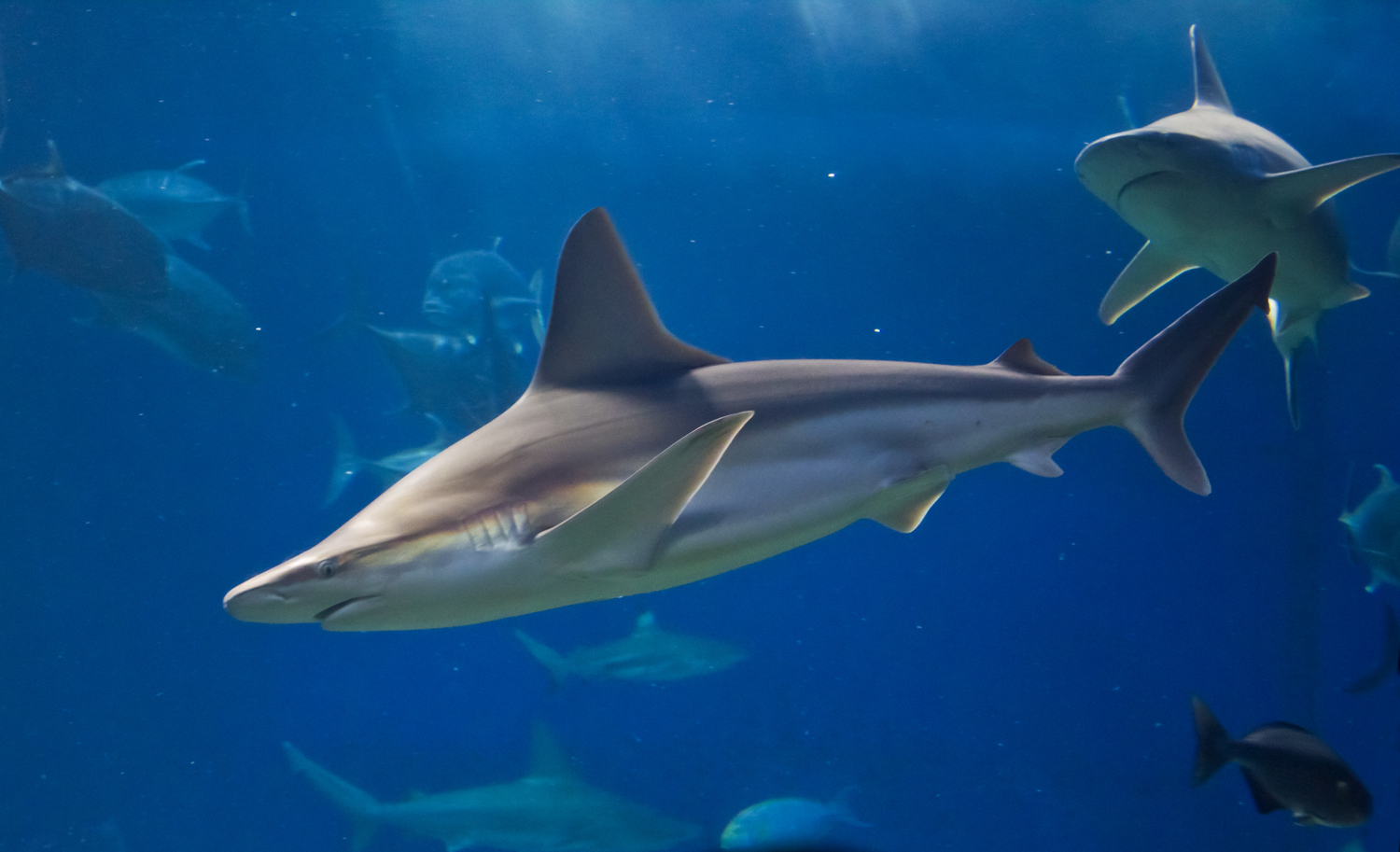
Sandbar shark (Carcharhinus plumbeus).

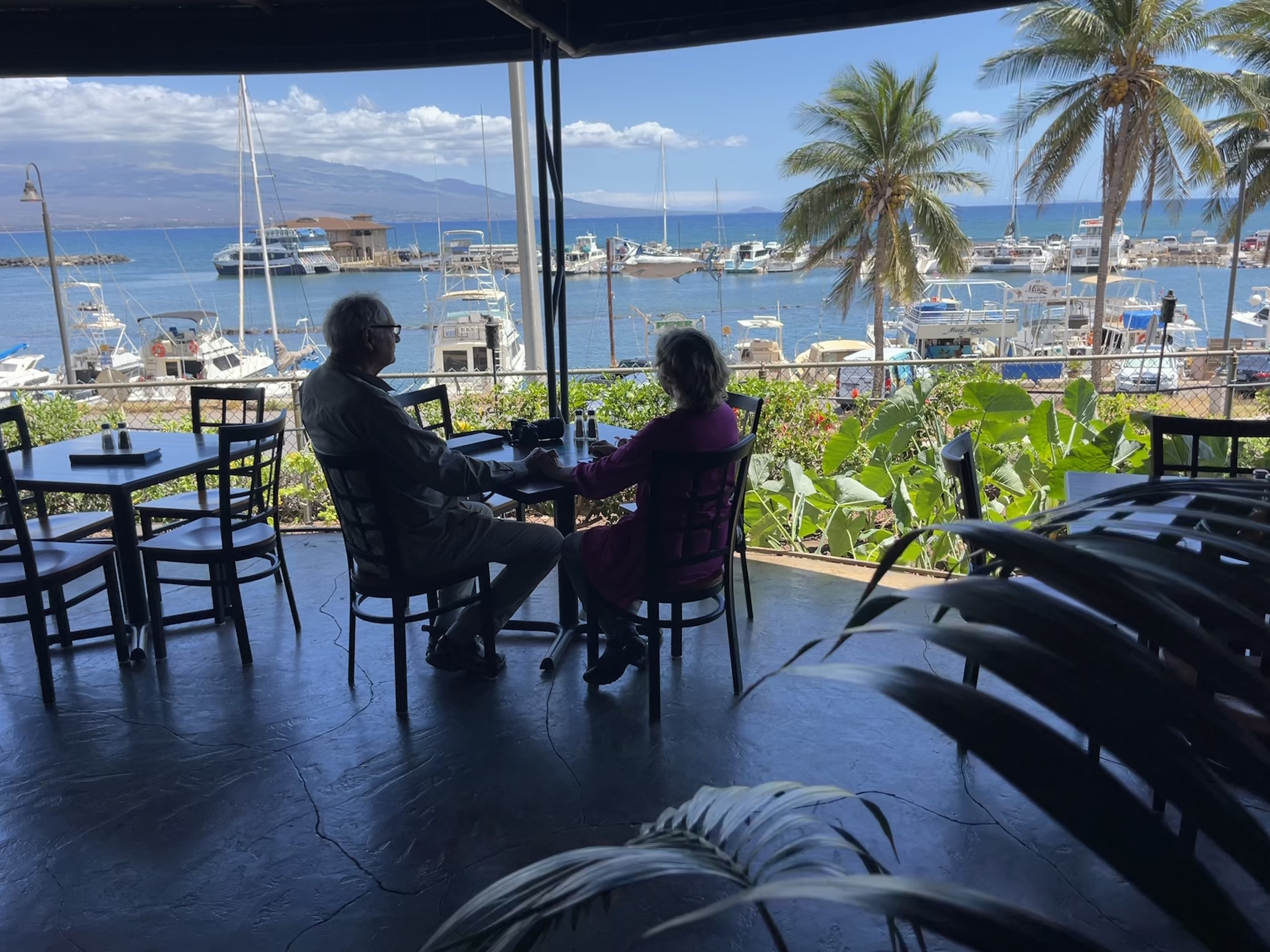
The SEASCAPE restaurant.
