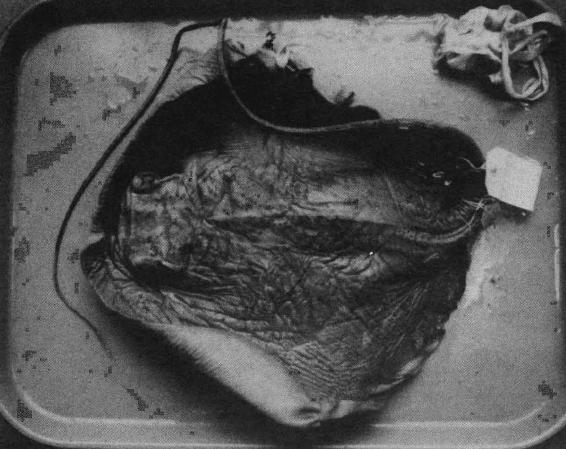

Conservation status
- Vulnerable (IUCN 3.1)

Scientific classification
- Kingdom: Animalia
- Phylum: Chordata
- Class: Chondrichthyes
- Subclass: Elasmobranchii
- Order: Myliobatiformes
- Family: Dasyatidae
- Genus: Dasyatis
- Species: D. ushiei

Binomial name
- Dasyatis ushiei (Jordan and Hubbs, 1925)

Synonyms
- Bathytoshia lata

= Dasyatis ushiei =

Species of cartilaginous fish

Dasyatis ushiei, the cow stingray or Ushi stingray, is a species of stingray known from a single specimen. Based on the single specimen, its range includes at least Mikawa Bay, Aichi Prefecture, middle Japan. Due to the limited knowledge of its biology and extent of capture in fisheries, this species is assessed as Data Deficient in 2007.

Molecular data from 2012 has confirmed that this species is a population of the Broad stingray.
