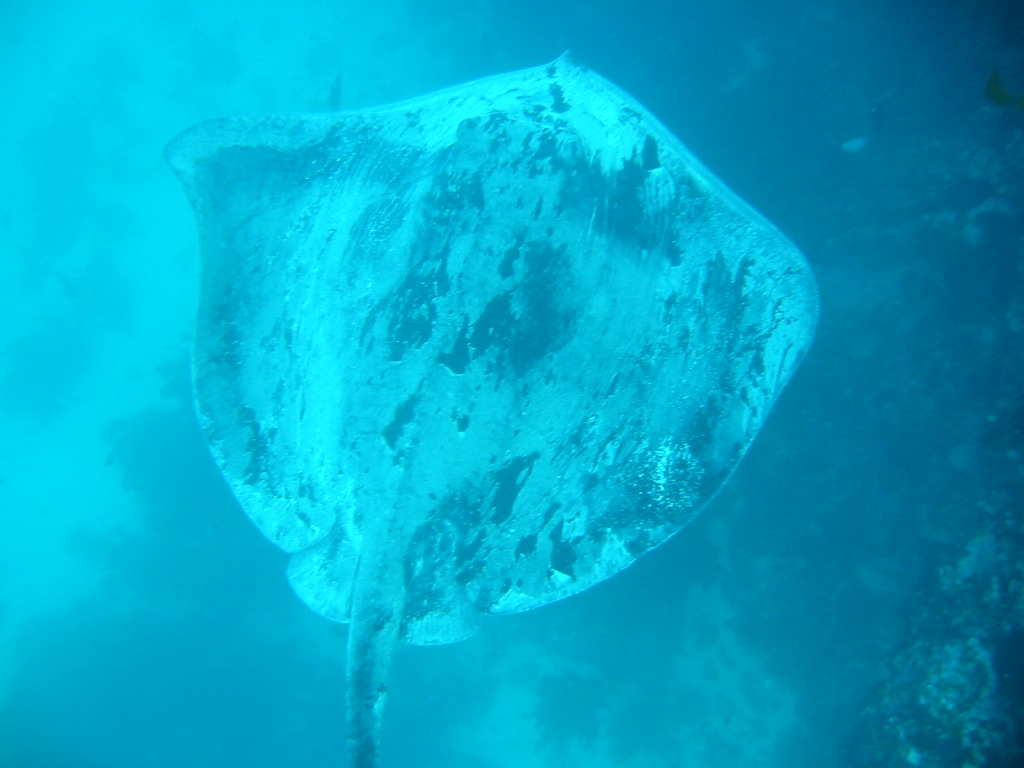

Conservation status
- Vulnerable (IUCN 3.1)

Scientific classification
- Kingdom: Animalia
- Phylum: Chordata
- Class: Chondrichthyes
- Subclass: Elasmobranchii
- Order: Myliobatiformes
- Family: Dasyatidae
- Genus: Dasyatis
- Species: D. thetidis

Binomial name
- Dasyatis thetidis J. D. Ogilby, 1899
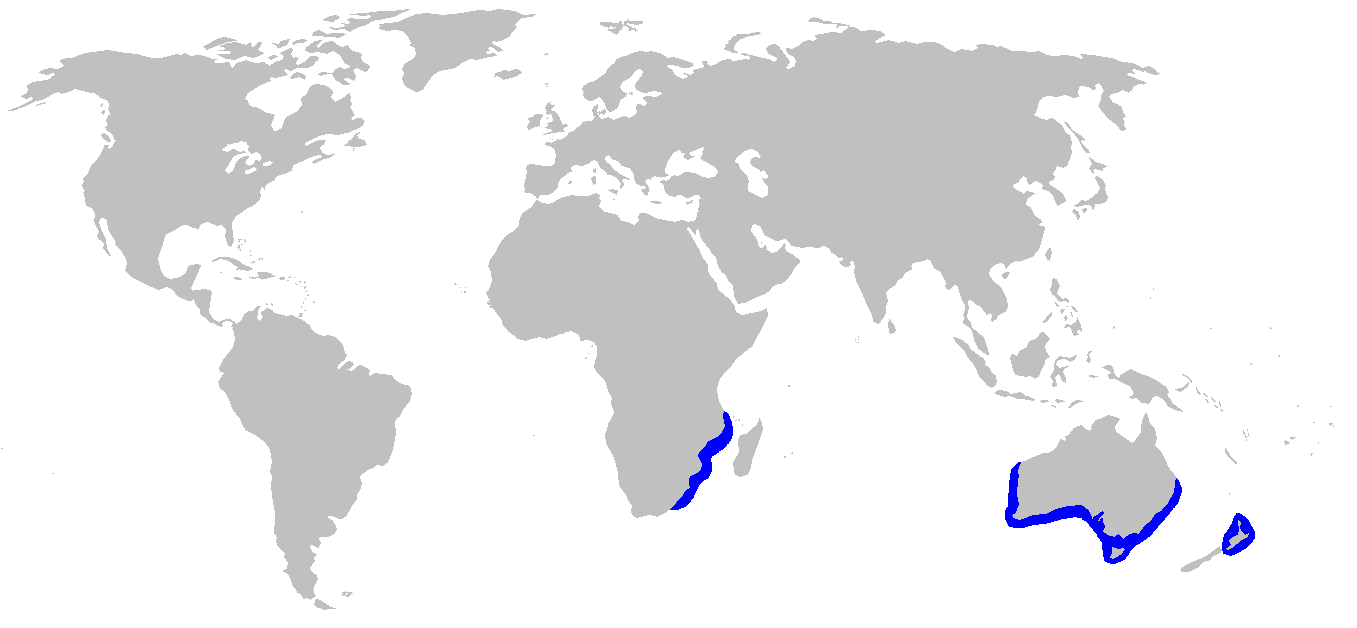
- Range of the thorntail stingray

Synonyms
- Dasyatis lubricus Smith, 1957; Dasybatus agulhensis Barnard, 1925

= Thorntail stingray =

Species of cartilaginous fish

The thorntail stingray, black stingray, or longtail stingray (Dasyatis thetidis) is a species of stingray in the family Dasyatidae. It is found off southern Africa, Australia, and New Zealand from the intertidal zone to a depth of 440 m (1,440 ft). This bottom-dweller inhabits soft-bottomed habitats such as lagoons, estuaries, and reefs. Growing to 1.8 m (5.9 ft) across and over 200 kg (440 lb) in weight, the thorntail stingray is among the largest stingrays in the world. Uniformly dark above and light below, it has a diamond-shaped pectoral fin disc and a very long, whip-like tail with a fin fold underneath. The upper surface of the disc and the tail bear numerous stout, sharp thorns.

The diet of the thorntail stingray consists of benthic invertebrates and bony fishes. It has been known to gather in large groups during summertime. Like other stingrays, it is aplacental viviparous, with the developing embryos sustained to term by histotroph ("uterine milk") produced by the mother. The venomous stinging spine of the thorntail stingray can inflict a painful injury, though it is not aggressive towards humans. It is caught by commercial and recreational fishers, though the impact of such activities on its population is unknown. As a result, the International Union for Conservation of Nature (IUCN) has listed this species as Data Deficient in 2008.

== Taxonomy ==
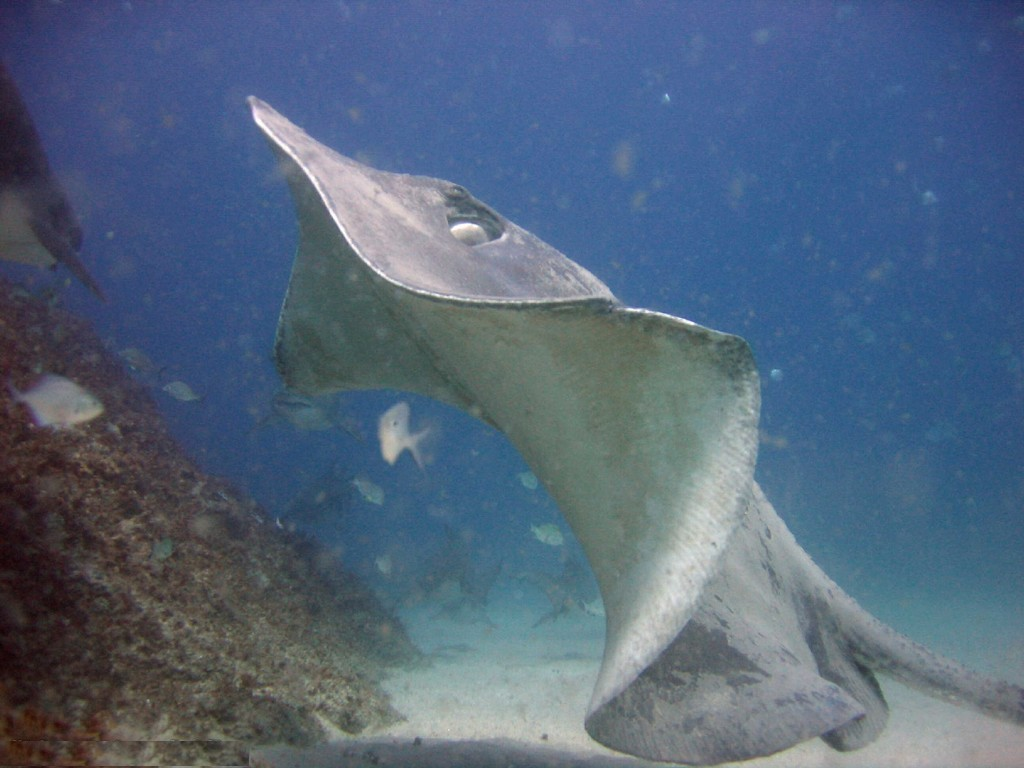
A thorntail stingray at Green Island, New South Wales.

Australian ichthyologist James Douglas Ogilby originally described the thorntail stingray from four specimens collected off New South Wales during the 1898 scientific expedition of the trawler HMCS Thetis, after which the species was named. His account was published a year later in the scientific journal Memoirs of the Australian Museum. Other common names for this species include black skate, black stingaree, long-tailed stingaree, longtail black stingray, thorn stingray, and thorntail ray.

Molecular data from 2012 has confirmed that this species is a population of the Broad stingray.

== Distribution and habitat ==
The thorntail stingray is found off southern Africa from Algoa Bay, South Africa to Barra da Falsa, Mozambique and Réunion, as well as off Australia from Shark Bay to northern New South Wales, Lord Howe Island, Norfolk Island, and New Zealand. It is fairly common off Australia and New Zealand and less so elsewhere. Favoring inshore habitats with soft bottoms, this benthic species is commonly encountered in estuaries and lagoons, around rocky and coral reefs, and over reef flats. In Australia, it has been known to swim up rivers. Off New Zealand, large groups of thorntail stingrays have been seen inside caves and beneath rocky arches. This species is known to occur as deep as 440 m (1,440 ft).

== Description ==
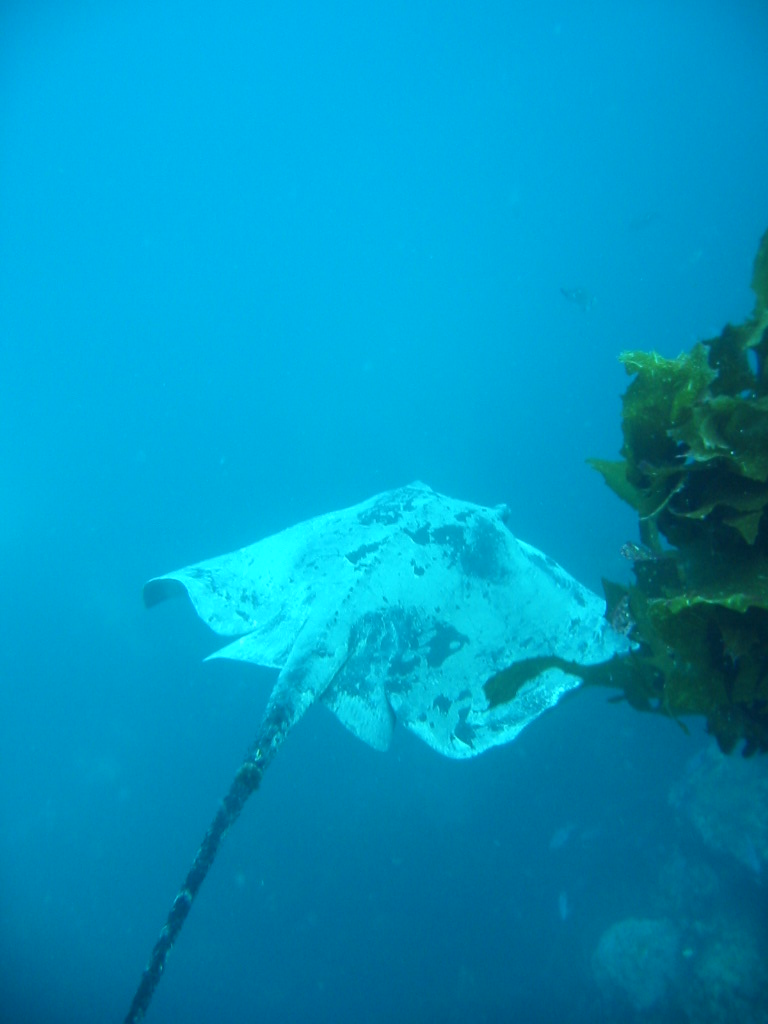
The presence of numerous thorns on the back and tail are a characteristic trait of the thorntail stingray.

One of the largest members of its family, the thorntail stingray reaches at least 4 m (13 ft) long, 1.8 m (5.9 ft) across, and 214 kg (472 lb) in weight. This species has a diamond-shaped pectoral fin disc about one-fourth wider than long, with sinuous leading margins converging to a slightly protruding snout tip and rounded outer and trailing margins. The mouth is slightly arched; there are five papillae across the floor with the outermost pair smaller and set apart from the others. The tooth rows number 25–43 in the upper jaw and 29–48 in the lower jaw, and are arranged with a quincunx pattern into pavement-like surfaces.

The pelvic fins have rounded tips and gently curved trailing margins. The whip-like tail measures about twice the length of the disc and bears one or two long stinging spines with up to 88 serrations. A narrow fin fold runs beneath the tail and ends well before the tail tip. Large juveniles and adults have a row of large, sharp thorns running along the midline of the back from behind the eyes to the tail spine, and thorns of various sizes are also scattered about the dorsal surface of the disc. The tail behind the spine is densely covered by stout thorns. This species is a uniform dark brown or gray to black above and whitish below. The longer tail, presence of thorns, and absence of white dots atop the disc differentiate this species from the short-tail stingray (D. brevicaudata), another giant stingray that shares its range.

== Biology and ecology ==
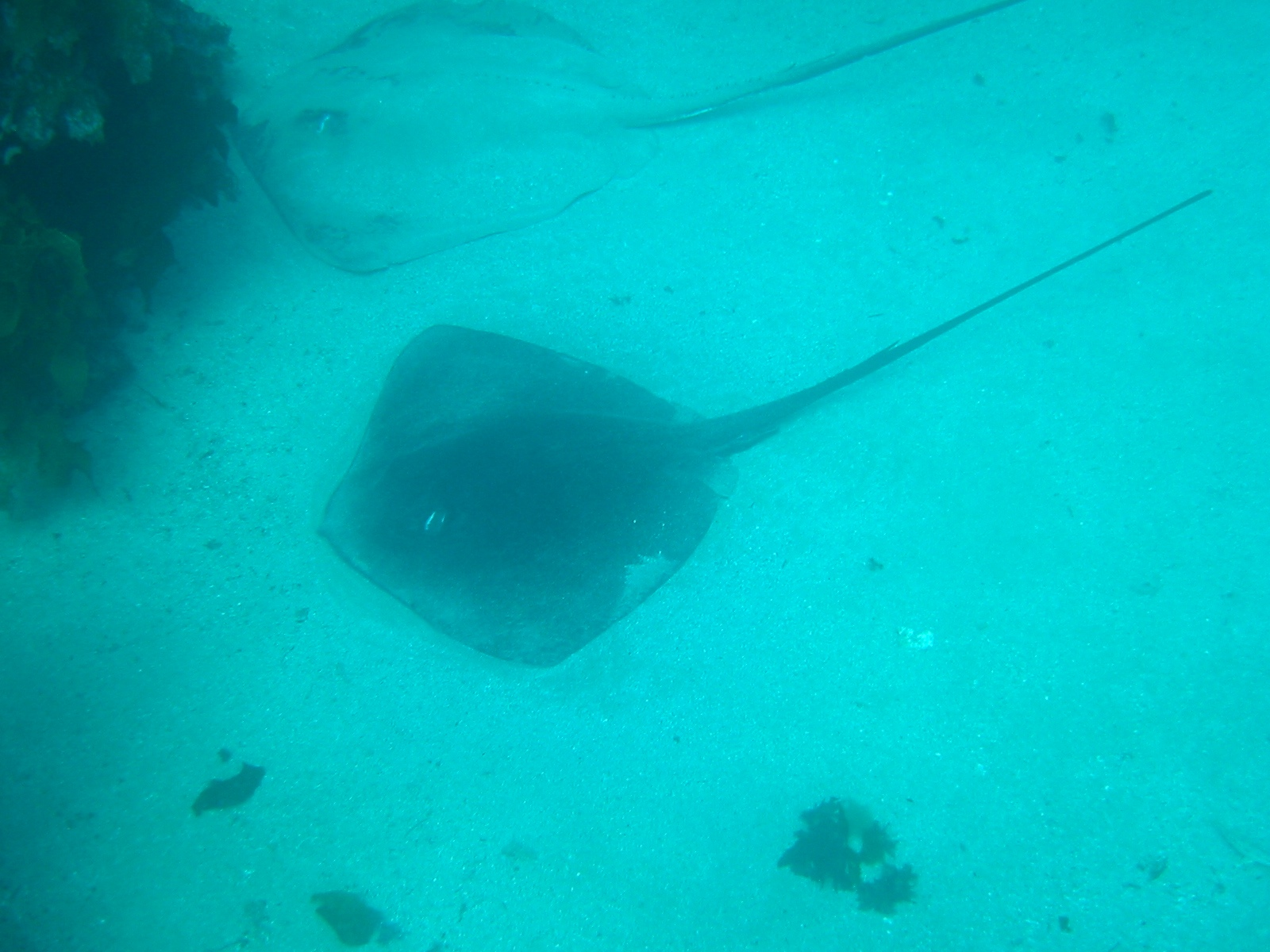
Thorntail stingrays often rest on the bottom during the day.

During the day, thorntail stingrays are often seen resting on patches of sand. This species preys mainly upon crabs, mantis shrimp, bivalves, polychaete worms, and conger eels. Off New Zealand, both it and the short-tail stingray regularly fall prey to local killer whales (Orcinus orca). A known parasite of this species is the nematode Echinocephalus overstreeti. Thorntail stingrays have been reported to congregate in warm, shallow waters during the summer, possibly for reproductive purposes. This species is aplacental viviparous like other stingrays.

== Human interactions ==
The tail spine of the thorntail stingray is potentially injurious to humans. It is reportedly unaggressive and approachable, and can be conditioned to accept being "ridden" by divers. At Hamelin Bay, Western Australia, many thorntail stingrays, short-tail stingrays, and Australian bull rays (Myliobatis australis) regularly gather to be hand-fed fish scraps; the number of visitors has steadily increased in recent years, and there is interest in developing the site as a permanent tourist attraction.

Thorntail stingrays are caught as bycatch in nets and on line gear, probably in low numbers. Most individuals landed are discarded, though the rate of survival after capture is unknown, as this species may be subject to persecution by fishery workers. Recreational anglers sometimes hook this ray, which may be difficult to bring in due to its size. A Thorntail stingray with a width of 1.67 m (5 ft 6 in) and length of 2.35 m (7 ft 9 in) was caught and released of Warner Beach, South Africa in Jan 2020.

From 1986 to 1997, New Zealand reported an average annual catch of 15 t (15 long tons; 17 short tons) for this species and the short-tail stingray combined, though this figure may underestimate the total fishery impact. In June 2018 the New Zealand Department of Conservation classified the thorntail stingray as "Not Threatened" with the qualifier "Secure Overseas" under the New Zealand Threat Classification System.
