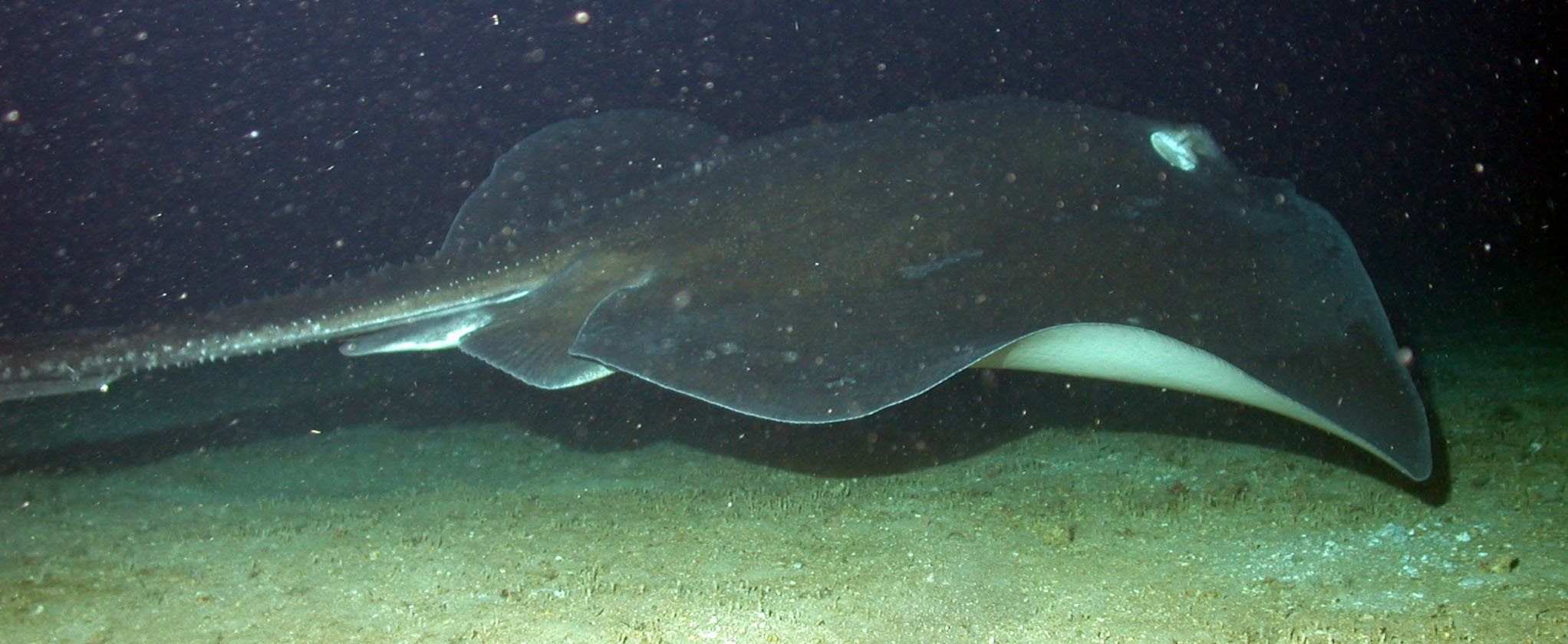
- Roughtail stingray (Bathytoshia centroura) at McGrail Bank, Gulf of Mexico

Conservation status
- Vulnerable (IUCN 3.1)

Scientific classification
- Kingdom: Animalia
- Phylum: Chordata
- Class: Chondrichthyes
- Subclass: Elasmobranchii
- Order: Myliobatiformes
- Family: Dasyatidae
- Subfamily: Dasyatinae
- Genus: Bathytoshia
- Species: B. centroura

Binomial name
- Bathytoshia centroura (Mitchill, 1815)
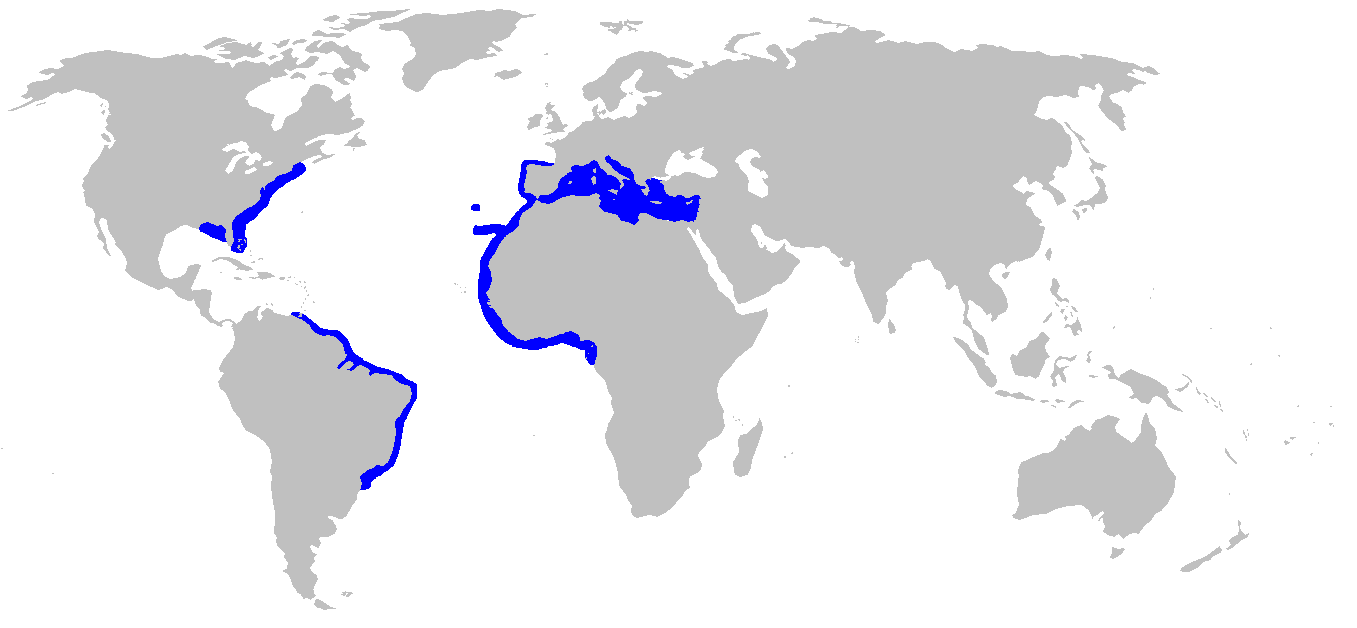
- Range of the roughtail stingray before reclassification of the eastern Atlantic population

Synonyms
- Dasyatis aspera (Cuvier, 1816); Dasyatis centroura (Mitchill, 1815); Dasybatus marinus Garman, 1913; Pastinaca acanthura Gronow, 1854; Pastinaca aspera Cuvier, 1816; Raia gesneri Cuvier, 1829; Raja centroura Mitchill, 1815; Trygon aldrovandi Risso, 1827; Trygon brucco Bonaparte, 1834; Trygon centrura (Mitchill, 1815); Trygon spinosissima Duméril, 1865; Trygon thalassia Müller & Henle, 1841

= Roughtail stingray =

Species of cartilaginous fish

The roughtail stingray (Bathytoshia centroura) is a species of stingray in the family Dasyatidae, with separate populations in coastal waters of the northwestern and southwestern Atlantic Ocean. This bottom-dwelling species typically inhabits sandy or muddy areas with patches of invertebrate cover, at a depth of 15–50 m (49–164 ft). It is seasonally migratory, overwintering in offshore waters and moving into coastal habitats for summer. The largest whip-tail stingray in the Atlantic, the roughtail stingray grows up to 2.6 m (8.5 ft) across and 360 kg (800 lb) in weight. It is plain in color, with an angular, diamond-shaped pectoral fin disc and a long, whip-like tail bearing a subtle fin fold underneath. The many thorns on its back and tail serve to distinguish it from other stingrays that share its range.

Often found lying on the bottom buried in sediment, the roughtail stingray is a generalist predator that feeds on a variety of benthic invertebrates and bony fishes. It is aplacental viviparous, with the embryos receiving nourishment initially from yolk, and later from histotroph ("uterine milk") produced by the mother. The venomous tail spine of the roughtail stingray is potentially dangerous to humans. The International Union for Conservation of Nature (IUCN) has listed this species as vulnerable overall.

== Taxonomy and phylogeny ==
The first description of the roughtail stingray was published by American naturalist Samuel Mitchell in one of the earliest North American works on ichthyology, a short treatise on the fishes of New York in the 1815 first volume of Transactions of the Literary and Philosophical Society of New York. Mitchell based his account on specimens caught off Long Island, though did not designate any types, and named the new species Raja centroura, from the Greek centoro ("pricker") in reference to its thorns. Subsequent authors moved this species to the genus Dasyatis. This ray may also be referred to as rough-tailed stingray, rough-tailed northern stingray, or thorny stingray.

The taxonomy of the roughtail stingray is not fully resolved, with the disjunct northwestern Atlantic and southwestern Atlantic populations differing in life history and perhaps representing a complex of different species. Lisa Rosenberger's 2001 phylogenetic analysis of 14 Dasyatis species, based on morphology, found that the roughtail stingray is the sister species to the broad stingray (B. lata), and that they form a clade with the southern stingray (Hypanus americanus) and the longtail stingray (H. longa). The close relationship between the roughtail and southern stingrays was upheld by a genetic analysis published by Leticia de Almeida Leao Vaz and colleagues in 2006. The roughtail and broad stingrays are found in the Atlantic and Pacific Oceans respectively, and therefore likely diverged before or with the formation of the Isthmus of Panama (c. 3 Ma). A Molecular phylogenetic review in 2016 led to the eastern Atlantic B. centroura being redesignated as Bathytoshia lata.

== Distribution and habitat ==
The roughtail stingray is broadly but discontinuously distributed in the coastal waters of the western Atlantic Ocean. It occurs from the Georges Bank off Cape Cod, Massachusetts following warm ocean waters southward to Florida, the Bahamas, and the northeastern Gulf of Mexico; there are also scattered reports from Venezuela to Argentina and on the Barrier reef in Belize. A single record from Kollam, India was likely a misidentification.

One of the deepest-diving stingrays, the roughtail stingray has been recorded to a depth of 274 m (899 ft) in the Bahamas. However, it is most common at a depth of 15–50 m (49–164 ft). This bottom-dwelling species favors live-bottom habitat (patches of rough terrain that are densely encrusted by sessile invertebrates), and also frequents adjacent open areas of sand or mud. Rays in the northwestern Atlantic do not usually enter brackish water.

The favored temperature range of the roughtail stingray is 15–22 °C (59–72 °F), which is the most important factor determining its distribution. It conducts seasonal migrations off the eastern United States: from December to May, this ray is found over the middle and outer parts of the continental shelf from Cape Hatteras in North Carolina to Florida, with larger rays occurring further south than smaller ones. In the spring, the population moves north of Cape Hatteras to the waters off Long Island, New York and Cape Cod, Massachusetts towards the coast into bays, inlets, and saltier estuaries, though preserving the north-south gradient of body sizes. Pregnant females tend to be found apart from other individuals.

== Description ==
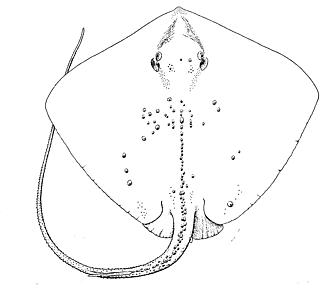
The roughtail stingray is characterized by the angular shape of its disc and the thorns over its body and tail.

The roughtail stingray has a diamond-shaped pectoral fin disk 1.2–1.3 times as wide as long, with straight to gently sinuous margins, rather angular outer corners, and a moderately long, obtuse snout. The eyes are proportionally smaller than other stingrays in its range and immediately followed by larger spiracles. There is a curtain of skin between the nostrils with a finely fringed posterior margin. The mouth is bow-shaped with a row of six papillae (nipple-like structures) across the floor. The seven upper and 12–14 lower tooth rows at the center are functional, though the total number of tooth rows is much greater. The teeth are arranged with a quincunx pattern into flattened surfaces; each has a tetragonal base with a blunt crown in juveniles and females, and a pointed cusp in adult males.

The pelvic fins have nearly straight margins and angular tips. The tail is long and whip-like, measuring some 2.5 times the length of the disc. A long, saw-toothed spine is placed atop the tail at around half a disc length back from the tail base; sometimes one or two replacement spines are also present in front of the existing one. Behind the spine, there is a long ventral fin fold that is much lower than that of the southern stingray. Individuals under 46–48 cm (18–19 in) across have completely smooth skin. Larger rays develop increasing numbers of distinctive tubercles or bucklers (flat-based thorns) over the middle of the back from the snout to the tail base, as well as dorsal and lateral rows of thorns on the tail. The bucklers vary in size, with the largest of equal diameter to the eye, and may bear up to three thorns each. This species is a uniform dark brown or olive above, and off-white below without dark fin margins. Among the largest members of its family, the roughtail stingray can reach 2.6 m (8.5 ft) across, 4.3 m (14 ft) long, and 360 kg (800 lb) in weight. Females grow larger than males.

== Biology and ecology ==
The roughtail stingray is reportedly not highly active, spending much time buried in the sediment. It is a generalist predator whose diet generally reflects the most available prey in its environment. It mainly captures prey off the bottom, but also opportunistically takes free-swimming prey. A variety of invertebrates, as well as bony fishes such as sand lance and scup, are known to be consumed. Off Massachusetts, the main prey are crabs (Cancer), bivalves (Mya), gastropods (Polinices), squid (Loligo) and annelid worms. In Delaware Bay, most of its diet consists of the sand shrimp Crangon septemspinosa and the blood worm Glycera dibranchiata; the overall dietary composition there is nearly identical to that of bluntnose stingrays (Hypanus say) that share the bay. The shrimp Upogebia affinis is a major food source off Virginia. Off Florida, crustaceans (Rananoides, Ovalipes, Sicyonia brevirostris, and Portunus) and polychaete worms are the most important prey.

Sharks and other large fishes, in particular the great hammerhead (Sphyrna mokarran), prey upon the roughtail stingray. The live sharksucker (Echeneis naucrates) is sometimes found attached to its body. Known parasites of this species include the tapeworms Acanthobothrium woodsholei, Anthocephalum centrurum, Lecanicephalum sp., Oncomegas wageneri, Polypocephalus sp., Pterobothrium senegalense, and Rhinebothrium maccallumi, the monogenean Dendromonocotyle centrourae, and the leech Branchellion torpedinis.

Like other stingrays, the roughtail stingray is aplacental viviparous: the developing embryo is initially sustained by yolk and later by histotroph ("uterine milk", containing proteins, lipids, and mucus) delivered by the mother through finger-like projections of the uterine epithelium called "trophonemata". Only the left ovary and uterus are functional in adult females. Off the eastern United States, reproduction occurs on an annual cycle with mating in winter and early spring. After a gestation period of 9–11 months, females give birth to 4–6 (typically five) young in fall or early winter. The newborns measure 34–37 cm (13–15 in) across. Males and females mature at 130–150 cm (51–59 in) and 140–160 cm (55–63 in) across respectively,

== Human interactions ==
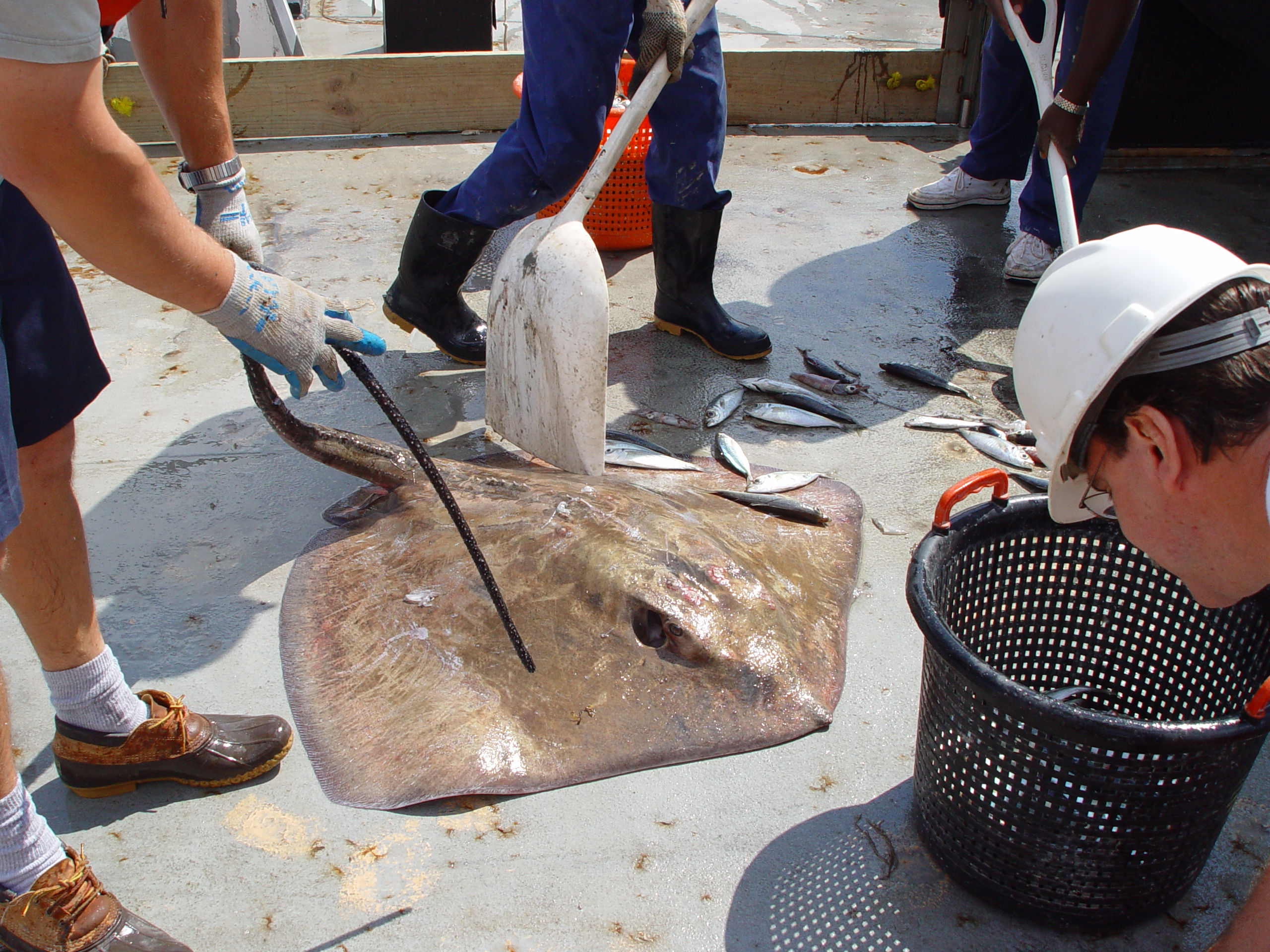
A roughtail stingray caught in the Gulf of Mexico; this was fished from United States waters.

With its large size and long, venomous spine, the roughtail stingray can inflict a severe wound and can be very dangerous for fishers to handle. However, it is not aggressive and usually occurs too deep to be encountered by beachgoers. It has been reported to damage farmed shellfish beds. The pectoral fins or "wings" are sold for human consumption fresh, smoked, or dried and salted; the rest of the ray may also be processed to obtain fishmeal and liver oil. The International Union for Conservation of Nature (IUCN) has assessed the roughtail stingray as of Least Concern worldwide, while noting that as a large, slow-reproducing species it is susceptible to population depletion.

In the northwestern Atlantic, the roughtail stingray is listed under Least Concern; it is not targeted or utilized by commercial fisheries, though inconsequential numbers are captured incidentally in trawls and on demersal longlines. Historically, it was sometimes ground up for fertilizer. Though no specific data is available on this species, declines of other species and its intrinsic susceptibility to depletion have led it to be assessed as Near Threatened in the region. In the southwestern Atlantic, the roughtail stingray and other large rays are heavily fished using demersal trawls, gillnets, longlines, and hook-and-line; this fishing pressure is liable to increase due to growing commercial interest in using large stingrays for minced fish products. Anecdotal reports suggest that landings of this species are decreasing, leading to an assessment of Vulnerable.
