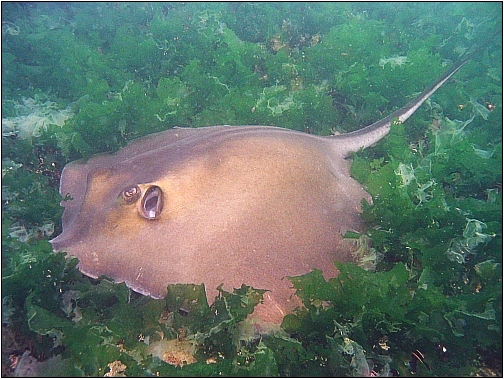

Conservation status
- Vulnerable (IUCN 3.1)

Scientific classification
- Kingdom: Animalia
- Phylum: Chordata
- Class: Chondrichthyes
- Subclass: Elasmobranchii
- Order: Myliobatiformes
- Family: Dasyatidae
- Genus: Dasyatis
- Species: D. pastinaca

Binomial name
- Dasyatis pastinaca (Linnaeus, 1758)
- Range of the common stingray

Synonyms
- Dasyatis ujo Rafinesque, 1810; Pastinaca laevis Gronow, 1854; Pastinaca olivacea Swainson, 1839; Raja pastinaca Linnaeus, 1758; Trygon vulgaris Risso, 1827

= Common stingray =

Species of cartilaginous fish

The common stingray (Dasyatis pastinaca) is a species of stingray in the family Dasyatidae, found in the northeastern Atlantic Ocean and the Mediterranean and Black Seas. It typically inhabits sandy or muddy habitats in coastal waters shallower than 60 m (200 ft), often burying itself in sediment. Usually measuring 45 cm (18 in) across, the common stingray has a diamond-shaped pectoral fin disc slightly wider than long, and a whip-like tail with upper and lower fin folds. It can be identified by its plain coloration and mostly smooth skin, except for a row of tubercles along the midline of the back in the largest individuals..

The predominant prey of the common stingray are bottom-dwelling crustaceans, though it also takes molluscs, polychaete worms, and small bony fishes. It is aplacental viviparous: the embryos are nourished by yolk and later histotroph ("uterine milk") produced by the mother. Females bear 4–9 young twice per year in shallow water, after a gestation period of four months. The common stingray can inflict a painful, though rarely life-threatening, wound with its venomous tail spine. During classical antiquity, its sting was ascribed many mythical properties. This species is not sought after by commercial fisheries, but is taken in large numbers as bycatch and utilized for food, fishmeal, and liver oil. Its population is apparently dwindling across its range, and the International Union for Conservation of Nature (IUCN) assesses it as Vulnerable.

== Taxonomy and phylogeny ==
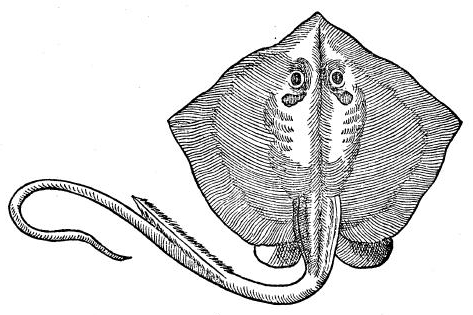
The oldest published depiction of a common stingray, from Pierre Belon's 1553 De Aquatilibus Libri Duo.

- - Neotrygon kuhlii
  - - Pteroplatytrygon violacea
    - - Pastinachus sephen
      - - Dasyatis pastinaca
        - - - Dasyatis dipterura
            - Dasyatis say
          - other Dasyatis

Phylogenetic tree of Dasyatis, from Rosenberger (2001). Taxon names have been updated.

Well-documented since classical antiquity, the common stingray was known as trygon (τρυγών) to the ancient Greeks and as pastinaca to the ancient Romans. An old common name for this species, used in Great Britain since at least the 18th century, is "fire-flare" or "fiery-flare", which may refer to the reddish color of its meat.

The first formal scientific description of the common stingray, as Raja pastinaca, was authored by the father of taxonomy Carl Linnaeus in the 1758 tenth edition of Systema Naturae. It has since been placed in the genus Dasyatis. There are at least 25 earlier references to this ray in literature, under various non-binomial names such as Raja corpore glabro, aculeo longo anterius serrato in cauda apterygia, Pastinaca marina prima, and Pastinaca marina lævis. Many of these early accounts, including Linnaeus', also incorporated information from other species. Consequently, the designation of a lectotype is warranted in the interests of taxonomic stability, but this has yet to be enacted.

The blue stingray (Dasyatis chrysonota) of southern Africa has long been regarded as a variant of the common stingray. However, the common stingray lacks the blue markings of the other species and differs in morphological and meristic characters, which led the latter to be definitively recognized as a separate species by Paul Cowley and Leonard Compagno in 1993. The distinction between this species and the similar Tortonese's stingray (D. tortonesei) of the Mediterranean is poorly understood and may not be valid, requiring further investigation.

In 2001, Lisa Rosenberger published a phylogenetic analysis of 14 Dasyatis species, based on morphology. The common stingray was reported to be the most basal member of the genus, other than the bluespotted stingray (D. kuhlii) and pelagic stingray (D. violacea). However, D. violacea has generally been recognized as belonging to its own genus Pteroplatytrygon, and recently D. kuhlii has also been placed in a different genus, Neotrygon.

== Distribution and habitat ==
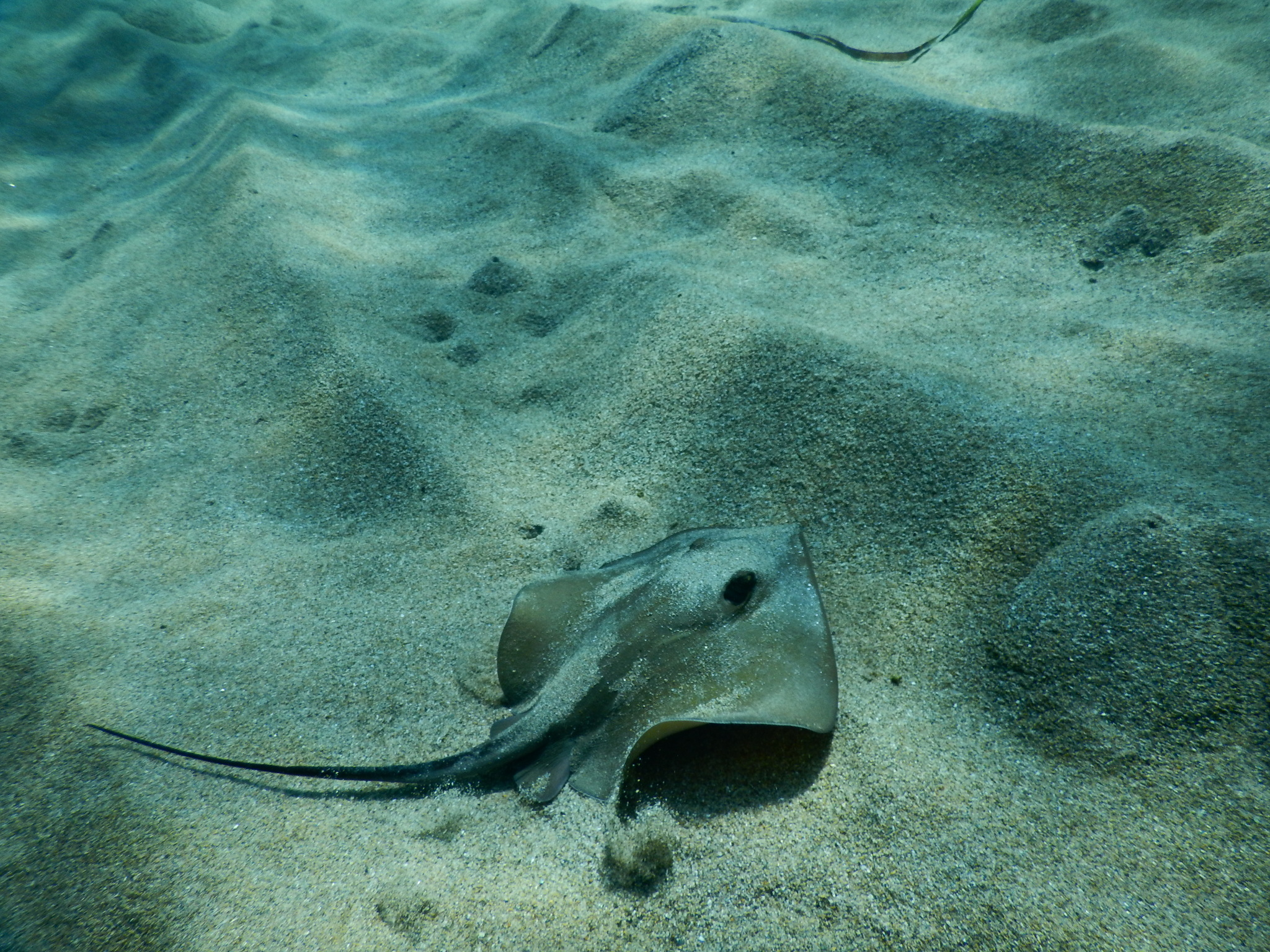
Sandy areas are a favored habitat for the common stingray.

The common stingray is found throughout the Mediterranean and Black Seas. It also occurs, though in significantly lower numbers, in the northeastern Atlantic Ocean from southern Norway and the western Baltic Sea to Madeira and the Canary Islands. This bottom-dwelling species can be found from the shore to a depth of 200 m (660 ft), though it is not usually found deeper than 60 m (200 ft). It favors sandy or muddy bottoms in calm water, and is also sometimes encountered near rocky reefs or in estuaries, as it is tolerant of low salinity. Off the Azores, common stingrays are most abundant in summer and least abundant in winter, suggestive of a seasonal shift in range and/or depth as has been documented in other ray species.

== Description ==
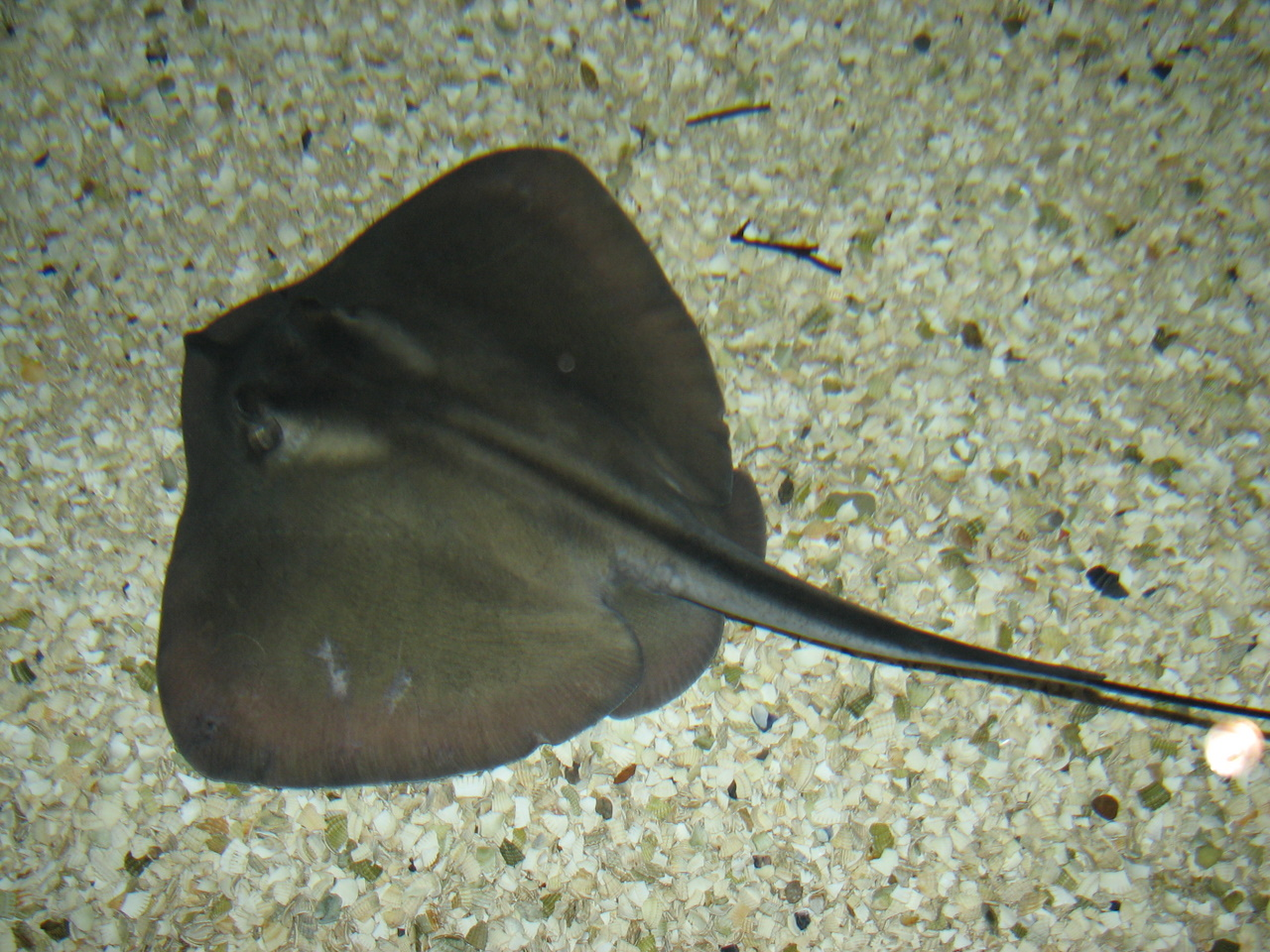
The common stingray has a plain coloration and mostly smooth skin.

The common stingray has been reported to reach a width of 1.4 m (4.6 ft) and a length of 2.5 m (8.2 ft), though a width of 45 cm (18 in) is more typical. The flattened pectoral fin disc is diamond-shaped and slightly wider than it is long, with narrowly rounded outer corners. The leading margins of the disc are almost straight and converge on a pointed, slightly protruding snout; the trailing margins of the disc are convex. The eyes are smaller than the spiracles (paired respiratory openings), which are placed closely behind. There are 28–38 upper tooth rows and 28–43 lower tooth rows; the teeth are small and blunt, and arranged into flattened surfaces. There are five papillae (nipple-like structures) across the floor of the mouth.

The tail is slender and whip-like, measuring approximately half as long as the disc. A stinging spine with strong serrations, measuring up to 35 cm (14 in) long and equipped with a venom gland at its base, is positioned about a third of the distance along the tail. A second or even third spine may also be present, as the spines are regularly replaced and new spines grow in before existing ones have been shed. The tail behind the spine bears a low cutaneous fold on top and a short, deep fold underneath. The body and tail are smooth, save for a few dermal denticles on the leading edge of the disk; older individuals may also develop a row of bony knobs along the midline of the back. This species is a solid gray, brown, reddish, or olive-green above, and whitish below with dark fin margins. Young rays may have white spots.

The largest recorded common stingray specimen was found in 2016 in the İzmir Province of Turkey in the course of a study on trolling. Its fins had a width of 2.21 metres (7.3 ft), although its length could not be determined as the tail had been removed earlier.

== Biology and ecology ==
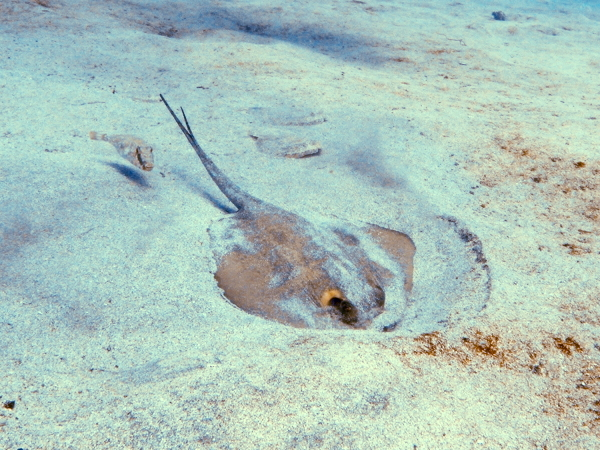
The common stingray forages for invertebrates and small fishes on the sea bottom.

Encountered singly or in "social" groups, the common stingray appears to segregate by sex to some degree and may be more active at night, tending to bury itself in sediment during daytime. It feeds on a wide variety of bottom-dwelling organisms, including crustaceans, cephalopods, bivalves, polychaete worms, and small bony fishes. It reportedly does great damage to cultured shellfish beds. One study in the Gulf of İskenderun off Turkey found that crustaceans comprised some 99% of its diet, with fish prey becoming increasingly important with age. Another study off the coast of Tarsus, Turkey, found the most important dietary component to be the penaeid shrimp Metapenaeus stebbingi, followed by the pistol shrimp Alpheus glaber and the swimming crab Charybdis longicollis; cephalopods were relatively important for males, while fishes were important for females. Common stingrays have been observed closely following each other in the presence of food, possibly to take advantage of other individuals' foraging success.

The "fly" of a common stingray

Like other stingrays, the common stingray is aplacental viviparous: the embryos are initially sustained by yolk, which is later supplemented by histotroph ("uterine milk", enriched with proteins, fat, and mucus) delivered by the mother through numerous extensions of the uterine epithelium called trophonemata. Females bear two litters of 4–9 pups per year in shallow inshore waters, following a gestation period of four months. Various authors have generally reported birthing in summer, between May and September or over a narrower timeframe such as July to August. Mature rays are known to aggregate off the Balearic Islands from mid-June to July, possibly for reproductive purposes. Newborns measure about 8 cm (3.1 in) across and 20 cm (7.9 in) long. Males reach sexual maturity at 22–32 cm (8.7–12.6 in) across, and females at 24–38 cm (9.4–15.0 in) across. The oldest known individual from the wild was ten years of age, but the species has lived up to 21 years in captivity. Known parasites of the common stingray include the flukes Heterocotyle pastinacae and Entobdella diadema, and the tapeworm Scalithrium minimum.

== Human interactions ==
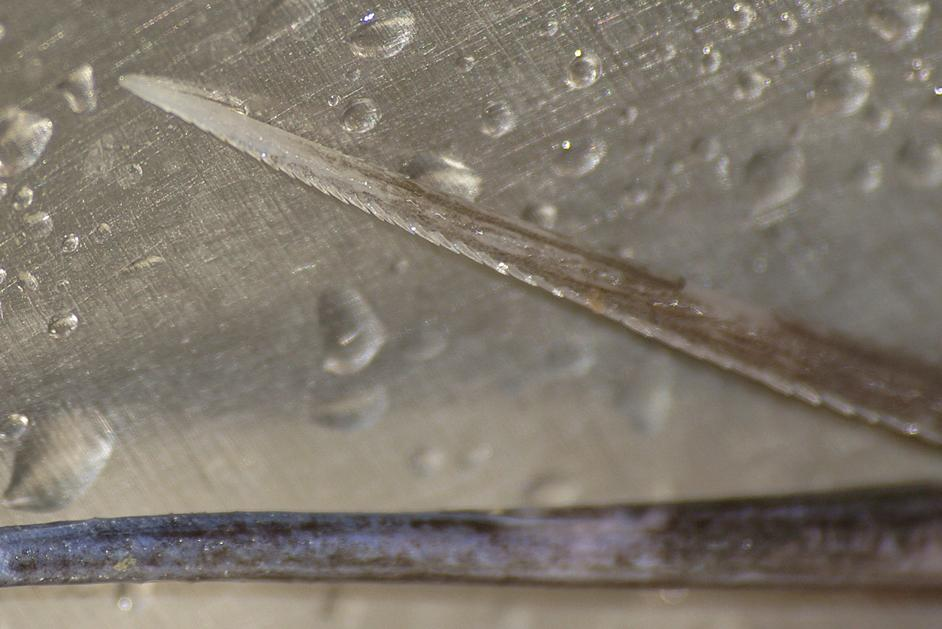
The serrated tail spine of the common stingray is potentially dangerous.

Though not aggressive, the common stingray can inflict an excruciating wound with its serrated, venomous tail spine. The ancient Greeks and Romans greatly feared its venom, with authors such as Aelian (175–235 AD) stating that stingray wounds were incurable. The Roman naturalist Pliny the Elder (23–79 AD), in his Natural History, asserted that its spine was capable of killing trees, piercing armor like an arrow, and corroding iron. Greek poet Oppian (172–210 AD) claimed that the touch of stingray venom could even dissolve stone. In Greek mythology, Hercules was said to have lost a finger to the bite of a stingray, and Circe was said to have armed her son Telegonus with a spear tipped with a stingray spine, with which he accidentally slew his father Odysseus.

British zoologist Francis Day, in his 1884 The Fishes of Great Britain and Ireland, noted that the common stingray was not eaten because of its "rank and disagreeable" flesh, and that Welsh fishermen used its liver oil as a treatment for burns and other injuries. In the present day, the pectoral fins or "wings" of this species are sold smoked or dried and salted, and it is also utilized as a source of fishmeal and liver oil. The liver is regarded as a delicacy in French cuisine, and used to prepare dishes such as beignets de foie de raie and foie de raie en croute.

Common stingrays are caught incidentally by commercial fisheries across many parts of its range, using bottom trawls, gillnets, bottom longlines, beach seines, and trammel nets. Because of its inshore habitat preferences, this ray is more susceptible to small-scale coastal fisheries than to industrial operations, such as in the Balearic Islands, where it makes up 40% of the shark and ray trammel net catch. Surveys indicate that common stingrays have declined in the Mediterranean and the northeastern Atlantic, and may have been extirpated from the Bay of Biscay. As a result, the International Union for Conservation of Nature (IUCN) has assessed this species as Vulnerable. The common stingray is protected within five marine protected areas (MPAs) in the Balearic Islands, and also benefits from a European Union ban on the use of trawls within 5.6 km (3.5 mi) of the coast.
