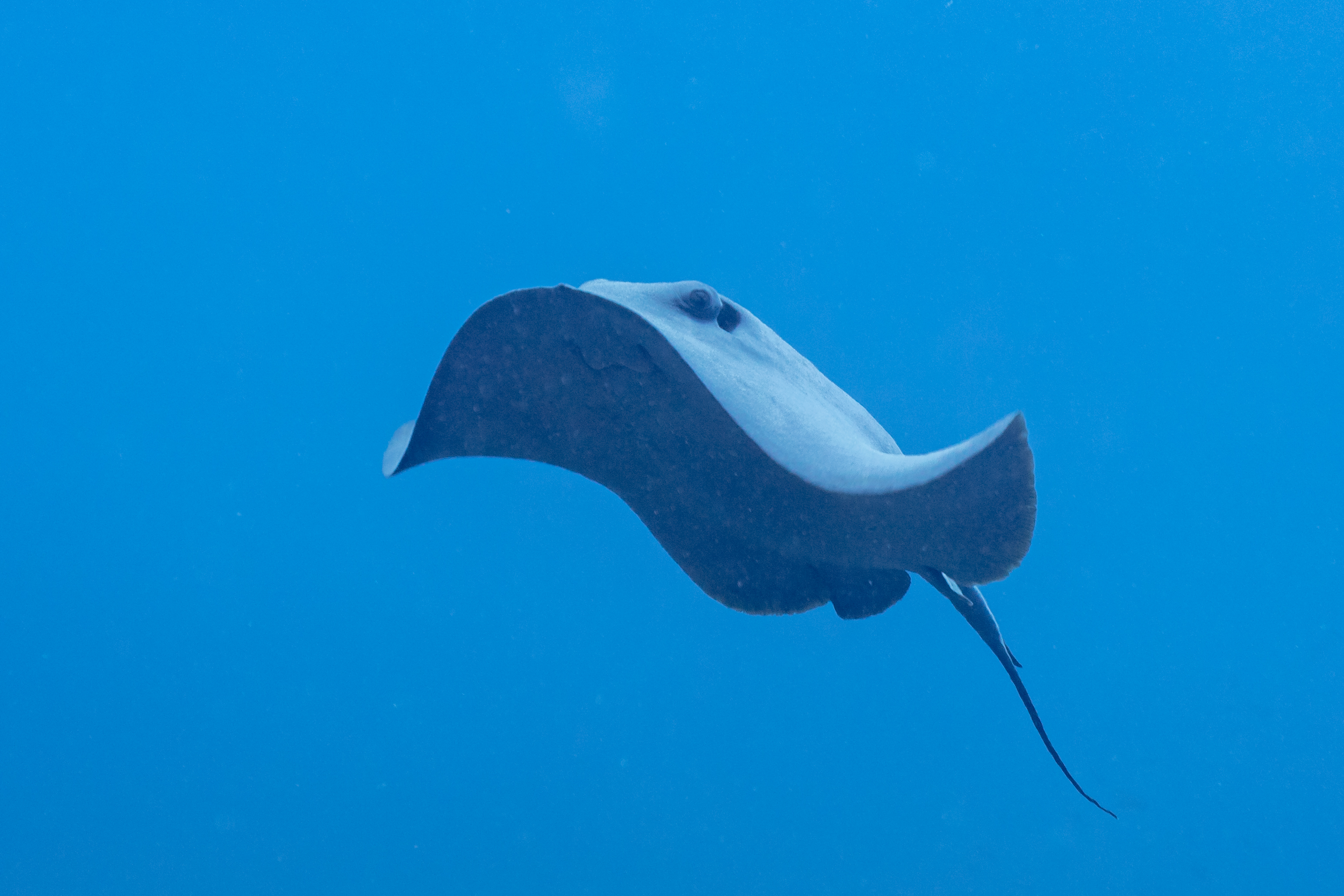

Conservation status
- Least Concern (IUCN 3.1)

Scientific classification
- Kingdom: Animalia
- Phylum: Chordata
- Class: Chondrichthyes
- Subclass: Elasmobranchii
- Order: Myliobatiformes
- Family: Dasyatidae
- Genus: Pteroplatytrygon; Fowler, 1910
- Species: P. violacea

Binomial name
- Pteroplatytrygon violacea (Bonaparte, 1832)
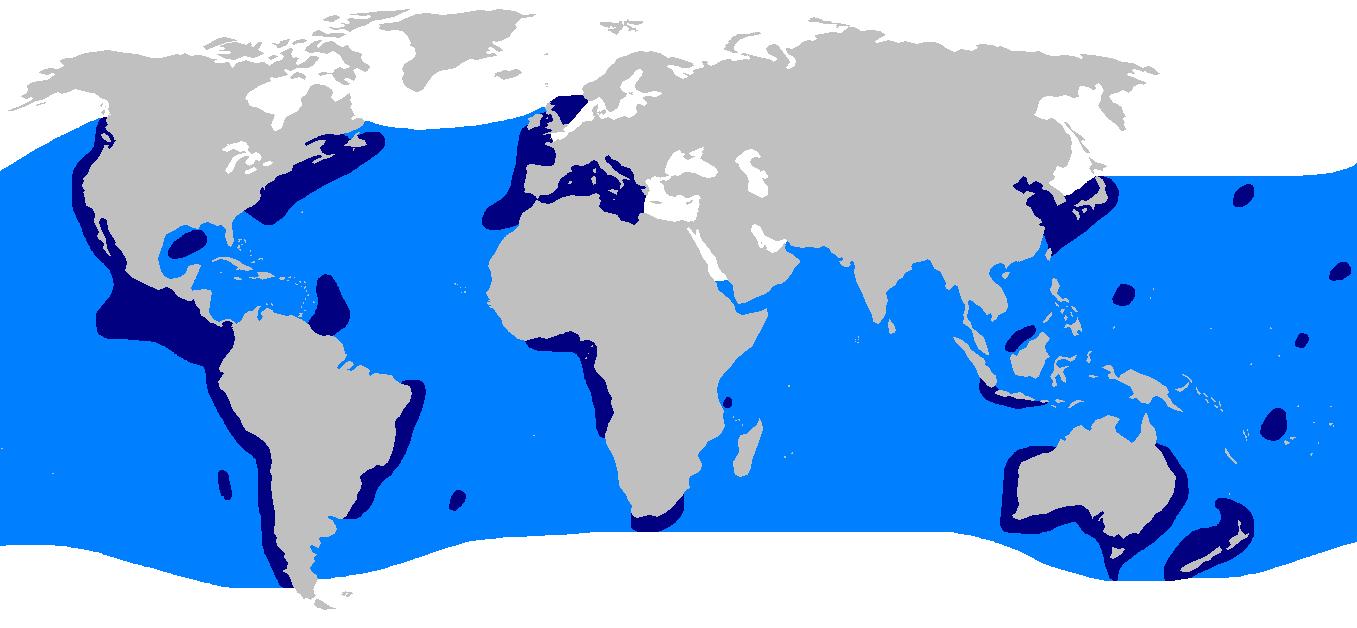
- Confirmed (dark blue) and possible (light blue) range of the pelagic stingray

Synonyms
- Dasyatis atratus Ishiyama & Okada, 1955; Dasyatis guileri Last, 1979; Trygon purpurea Müller & Henle, 1841; Trygon violacea Bonaparte, 1832

= Pelagic stingray =

Species of cartilaginous fish

The pelagic stingray (Pteroplatytrygon violacea) is a species of stingray in the family Dasyatidae, and the sole member of its genus. It is characterized by the wedge-like shape of its pectoral fin disc, which is much wider than long, as well as by the pointed teeth in both sexes, whip-like tail with extremely long tail spine, and uniform violet to blue-green coloration. It generally reaches 59 cm (23 in) in width. The pelagic stingray has a worldwide distribution in waters warmer than 19 °C (66 °F), and migrates seasonally to spend the summer closer to the continental shelf and at higher latitudes. The only stingray that almost exclusively inhabits the open ocean, this species is typically found in surface waters down to a depth of 100 m (330 ft). As a consequence of its midwater habits, its swimming style has evolved to feature more of a flapping motion of the pectoral fins, as opposed to the disc margin undulations used by other, bottom-dwelling stingrays.

The diet of the pelagic stingray consists of free-swimming invertebrates and bony fishes. It is an active hunter, using its pectoral fins to trap and move food to its mouth, and has been known to take advantage of seasonal feeding opportunities such as spawning squid. Like other stingrays, it is aplacental viviparous, meaning that the embryos are sustained initially by yolk and later by histotroph ("uterine milk"). With a short gestation period of 2–4 months, females may bear two litters of 4–13 pups per year. Birthing generally occurs in warm water near the equator, with the exception of the Mediterranean, with the timing varying between regions. Rarely encountered except by fishery workers, the pelagic stingray can inflict a severe, even fatal wound with its tail spine. This species is caught as bycatch throughout its range; it is of little economic value and usually discarded, often with high mortality. However, there is evidence that its numbers are increasing, perhaps owing to the heavy fishing of its natural predators and competitors (e.g., sharks). Along with the pelagic stingray's global distribution and prolific life history, this has led the International Union for Conservation of Nature (IUCN) to assess it as of Least Concern.

== Taxonomy and phylogeny ==
The pelagic stingray was originally described by French naturalist Charles Lucien Bonaparte in the 1832 third volume of Iconografia della fauna italica per le quattro classi degli animali vertebrati. He named it Trygon violacea, from the Latin viola ("purple"), and designated two specimens collected off Italy as the species syntypes. The genus Trygon has since been synonymized with Dasyatis. In 1910, American zoologist Henry Weed Fowler placed the pelagic stingray in the newly created subgenus Pteroplatytrygon, from the Greek pteron ("fin"), platus ("broad"), and trygon ("stingray"). Later authors elevated Pteroplatytrygon to the rank of full genus, though some taxonomists dispute whether this species is distinct enough to warrant separation from Dasyatis.

- - Taeniura lymma
  - - Neotrygon kuhlii
    - - Pteroplatytrygon violacea
      - - Pastinachus sephen
        - Dasyatis + Indo-Pacific Himantura

Phylogenetic tree of Dasyatidae. Taxon names have been updated.

Lisa Rosenberger's 2001 phylogenetic analysis, based on morphology, found that the pelagic stingray is one of the more basal members of its family, being the sister taxon to a clade that contains Pastinachus, Dasyatis, and Indo-Pacific Himantura species. Other common names for the pelagic stingray include the blue stingray and the violet stingray.

== Distribution and habitat ==
The distribution of the pelagic stingray extends nearly worldwide in tropical to warm-temperate pelagic waters, between the latitudes of 52°N and 50°S. In the western Atlantic, it has been reported from the Grand Banks of Newfoundland to North Carolina, the northern Gulf of Mexico, and the Lesser Antilles, Brazil and Uruguay. In the eastern Atlantic, this species has been recorded from the North Sea to Madeira, including the Mediterranean, as well as around Cape Verde, in the Gulf of Guinea and off South Africa. In the Pacific, it is known from Japan to Australia and New Zealand in the west, British Columbia to Chile in the east, and around many oceanic islands including Hawaii, the Galápagos, and Easter Island. There have been no reports of this species from much of the Indian Ocean, but it is known to be common in the southwestern portion and around Indonesia.

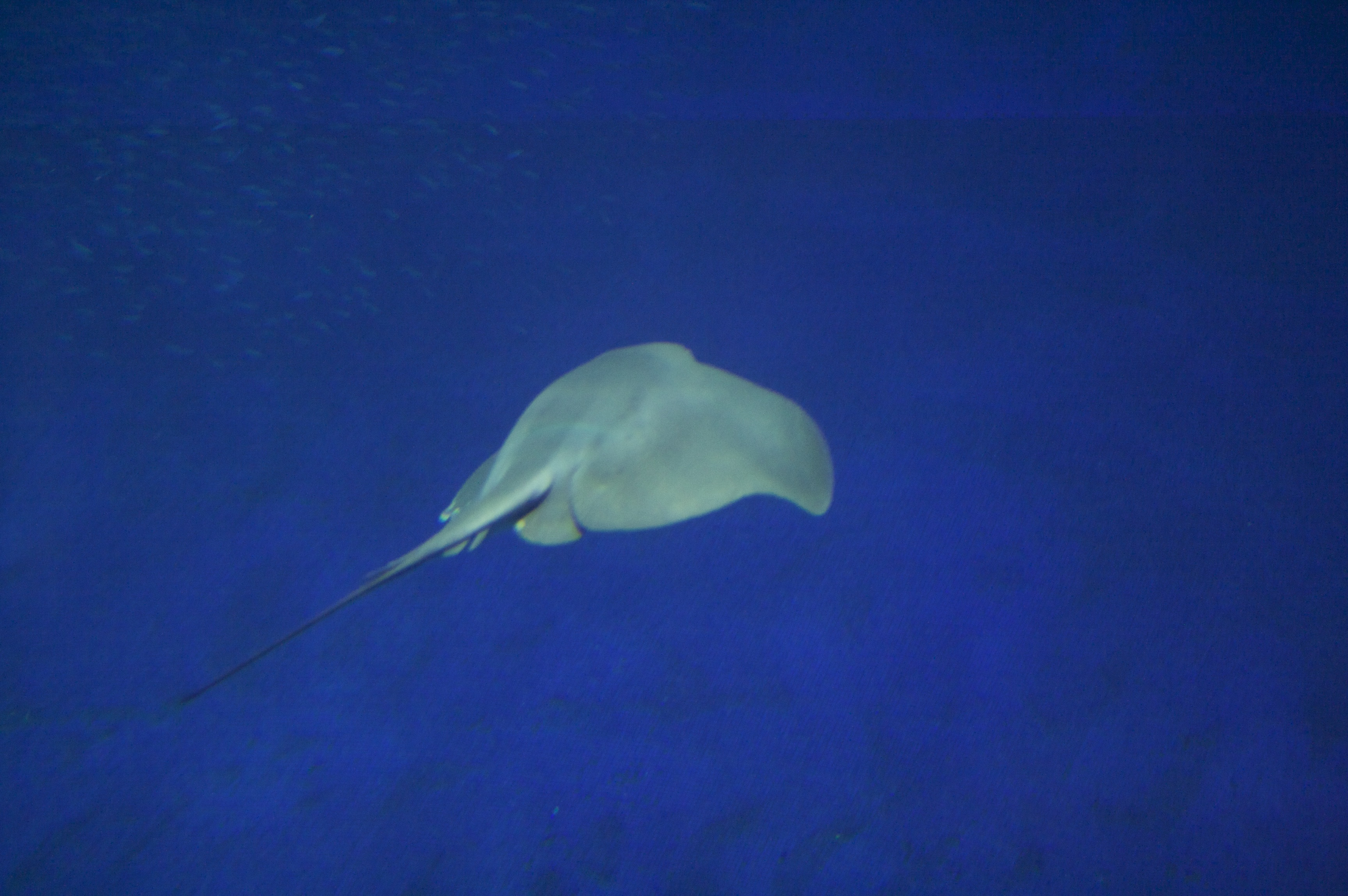
The pelagic stingray is the only stingray found almost exclusively in open water.

Unique amongst stingrays in inhabiting the open ocean rather than the sea floor, the pelagic stingray is generally found from the surface to a depth of 100 m (330 ft) over deep water. It has also been caught at a depth of 330–381 m (1,083–1,250 ft) over the Kyushu–Palau Ridge, indicating that it at least occasionally approaches the bottom. This species prefers water temperatures above 19 °C (66 °F), and will die if the temperature drops to 15 °C (59 °F).

The pelagic stingray performs seasonal migrations following warm water masses. In the northwestern Atlantic, it is found in or near the Gulf Stream from December to April, and moves north of the Stream to gather near the continental shelf from July to September. A similar migration seems to occur in the Mediterranean, though the specifics are unknown. In the Pacific, this species apparently spends the winter in oceanic waters near the equator and move into higher latitudes and towards the coast in spring. Two Pacific populations are known: one migrates from near Central America to California, and the other from the central Pacific to as far as Japan and British Columbia. Off southeastern Brazil, pelagic stingrays are displaced towards the coast by upwellings of cold water in late spring and summer; in some years they may even be pushed into inshore waters less than 45 m (148 ft) deep.

== Description ==
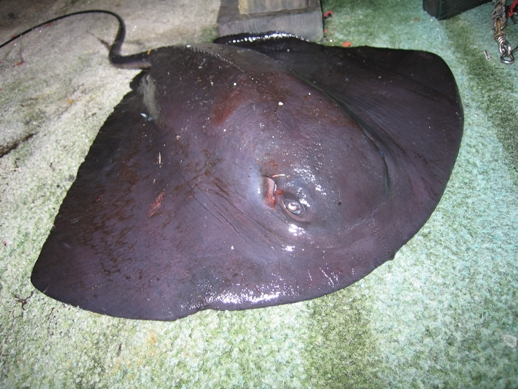
The pelagic stingray is characterized by a wedge-shaped disc much wider than long, non-protruding eyes, and dark purple coloration.

The pelagic stingray has a very thick, distinctively wedge-shaped pectoral fin disc one-third wider than long, with broadly curved leading margins, rather angular outer corners, and nearly straight trailing margins. The snout is short with a rounded tip. The eyes are minute and, unlike in other stingrays, do not protrude above the body; the spiracles (paired respiratory openings) follow immediate behind. There is a short but broad curtain of skin between the nostrils, with a weakly fringed rear margin. The mouth is small and gently arched, with deep furrows at the corners and a tiny projection at the center of the upper jaw that fits into an indentation on the lower jaw. There are anywhere from 0 to 15 forked papillae (nipple-like structures) in a row across the floor of the mouth. There are 25–34 upper tooth rows and 25–31 lower tooth rows; the teeth of both sexes have single, pointed cusps, but those of adult males are longer and sharper than those of adult females. The margins of the pelvic fins are nearly straight in front and become rounded at the tips and in back.

The whip-like tail measures up to twice as long as the disc; it is thick at the base and tapers significantly to the extremely long, serrated spine placed approximately one-third to halfway along its length. Two spines may be present if a replacement grows in before the original drops off. Posterior to the spine origin, there is a low ventral fin fold that does not reach to the spine tip. Young rays are completely smooth-skinned; with age small prickles appear over the center of the back, as well as a row of small thorns along the midline from between the eyes to the origin of the spine. This species is a plain dark purple to blue-green above, extending onto the tail fold, and a slightly lighter shade below. When captured and handled, it exudes a thick black mucus that covers its body. The pelagic stingray typically grows to 1.3 m (4.3 ft) long and 59 cm (23 in) across. The largest individuals on record are from a captive rearing experiment conducted from 1995 to 2000, in which a male reached 68 cm (27 in) across and 12 kg (26 lb), and a female 94 cm (37 in) across and 49 kg (108 lb).

== Biology and ecology ==
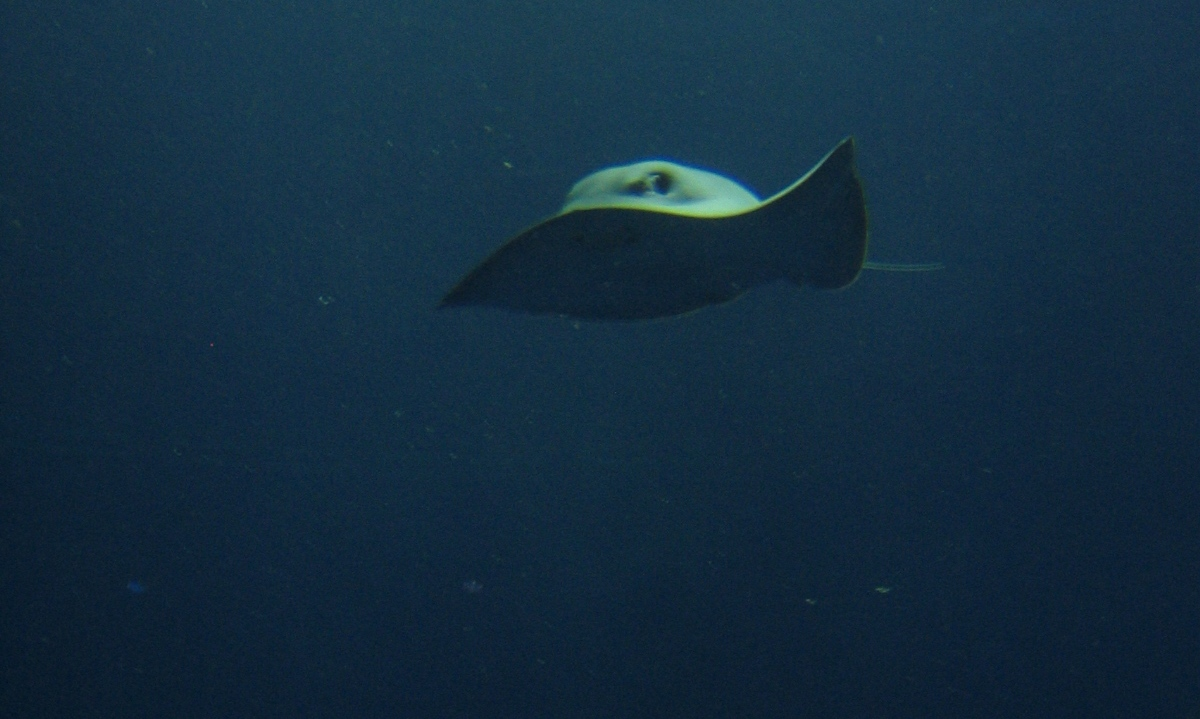
As an adaptation for living in the open ocean, the pelagic stingray swims more by flapping than undulating its disc.

In adopting a midwater lifestyle, the pelagic stingray exhibits several characteristics different from those of its bottom-dwelling relatives. While most stingrays propel themselves by undulating their disc margins, this species swims by oscillating (flapping) its pectoral fins in a manner approaching the "underwater flying" employed by eagle rays. Oscillatory fin motions generate lift, thus improving cruising efficiency in open water at a cost to maneuverability. The pelagic stingray is adept at swimming backwards, which may compensate for the lower fine control offered by its swimming mode.

Vision seems to be more important to the pelagic ray in finding food than in other stingrays. Compared to other members of its family, this species has less than one-third the density of electroreceptive ampullae of Lorenzini on its underside. The ampullae also cover a smaller area, though not as small as in eagle rays, and are more evenly distributed between the ventral and dorsal surfaces. This ray can detect an electric field of well under 1 nV/cm at a distance of up to 30 cm (12 in), and may be able to pick up the minute electric fields produced by moving sea water. The lateral line of the pelagic stingray, a complex system of mechanoreceptors that detect nearby movement and ocean currents, remains similar to other stingrays in covering a greater area on the ventral than the dorsal surface. However, this species is less responsive to mechanical than to visual stimuli.

Pelagic stingrays may segregate by sex, vertically in that males are found in deeper water than females, and perhaps horizontally as well. Captive individuals often act highly aggressively towards ocean sunfish (Mola mola), biting and harassing them, particularly if they are hungry. This species is preyed upon by oceanic whitetip sharks (Carcharhinus longimanus), great white sharks (Carcharodon carcharias), toothed whales, and other large, ocean-going carnivores. Its all-around dark coloration likely serves to camouflage it against its featureless habitat. The venom on its tail spine is also quite potent, causing it to be avoided by other fishes. Known parasites of this species include the tapeworms Acanthobothrium benedeni, A. crassicolle, and A. filicolle, Rhinebothrium baeri and R. palombii, and Tetragonocephalum uarnak, and the monogenean Entobdella diadema.

=== Feeding ===
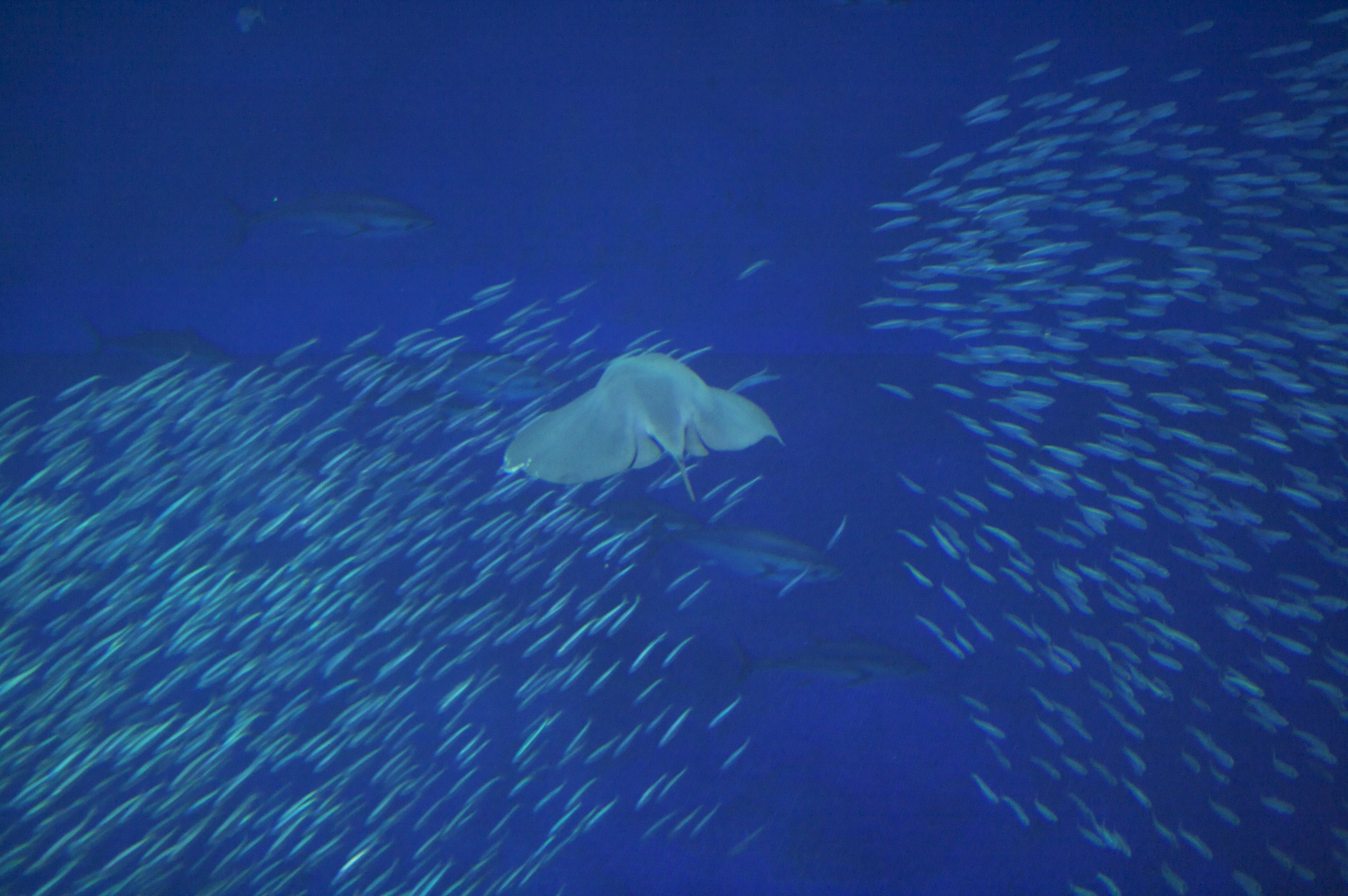
Small fish are one of the prey types pursued by the pelagic stingray.

The pelagic stingray is an active predator that captures prey by wrapping its pectoral fins around it, before manipulating it to the mouth. It is the only stingray in which both sexes have pointed teeth, for grasping and cutting into slippery prey. A wide variety of organisms are represented in its diet: crustaceans including amphipods, krill, and larval crabs, molluscs including squid, octopus, and pteropods, bony fishes including herring, mackerel, sea horses and filefish, comb jellies and medusae, and polychaete worms. Off California, pelagic stingrays hunt large mating aggregations of squid that form from November to April. Off Brazil, this species follows groups of Atlantic cutlassfish (Trichiurus lepturus) towards the coast in January and February, with both predators seeking small schooling fishes. Juvenile rays consume 6–7% of their body weight in food per day, which declines to just above 1% in adults.

=== Life history ===
Like other stingrays, the pelagic stingray is aplacental viviparous: the developing embryos are at first nourished by yolk, which is later supplanted by histotroph ("uterine milk", containing proteins, lipids, and mucus); the mother delivers the histotroph through numerous thread-like extensions of the uterine epithelium called "trophonemata", which feed into the enlarged spiracles of the embryo. Females have only one functional ovary and uterus, on the left, and may produce two litters per year. Mating occurs from March to June in the northwestern Atlantic, and in late spring in the southwestern Atlantic. Females are capable of storing sperm internally for more than a year, allowing them to wait for favorable environmental conditions in which to gestate their young. When first passed into the uterus, a batch of fertilized eggs are contained in a single membraneous capsule tapered at both ends. Shortly after, the capsule ruptures to release the eggs, and is expelled from the uterus. The gestation period may be the shortest of any shark or ray, lasting only 2–4 months, during which time the embryos increase a hundredfold in mass.

In the Pacific, females give birth in winter from November to March in a nursery area near Central America, prior to their northward migration. Similarly, in the northwestern Atlantic, birthing seems to occur in winter when the females are in warm southerly waters, possibly off the West Indies. However, records also exist of two possibly anomalous females that were pregnant much earlier in the year and would have given birth in August or September, before their southward migration. In the southwestern Atlantic, birthing occurs in summer around January, again in warmer water towards the equator. As opposed to other regions, in the Mediterranean females give birth in summer before moving to warmer waters. The litter size ranges from 4 to 13 (average six), and does not increase with the size of the female. Newborns measure 15–25 cm (5.9–9.8 in) across. Rays in captivity, with ample food, grow at an average annual rate of 8.1 cm (3.2 in) (disc width), while rays in the wild grow at an average annual rate of only 1.6 cm (0.63 in). The food intake and growth rate of adults are highest in January–February and July–August, and lowest in March–April and October–November. Males reach sexual maturity at 37–50 cm (15–20 in) across and two years of age, and females at 39–50 cm (15–20 in) and three years of age. This species may live up to 10–12 years. One of the most prolific rays, its intrinsic population growth rate is up to 31% a year.

== Human interactions ==
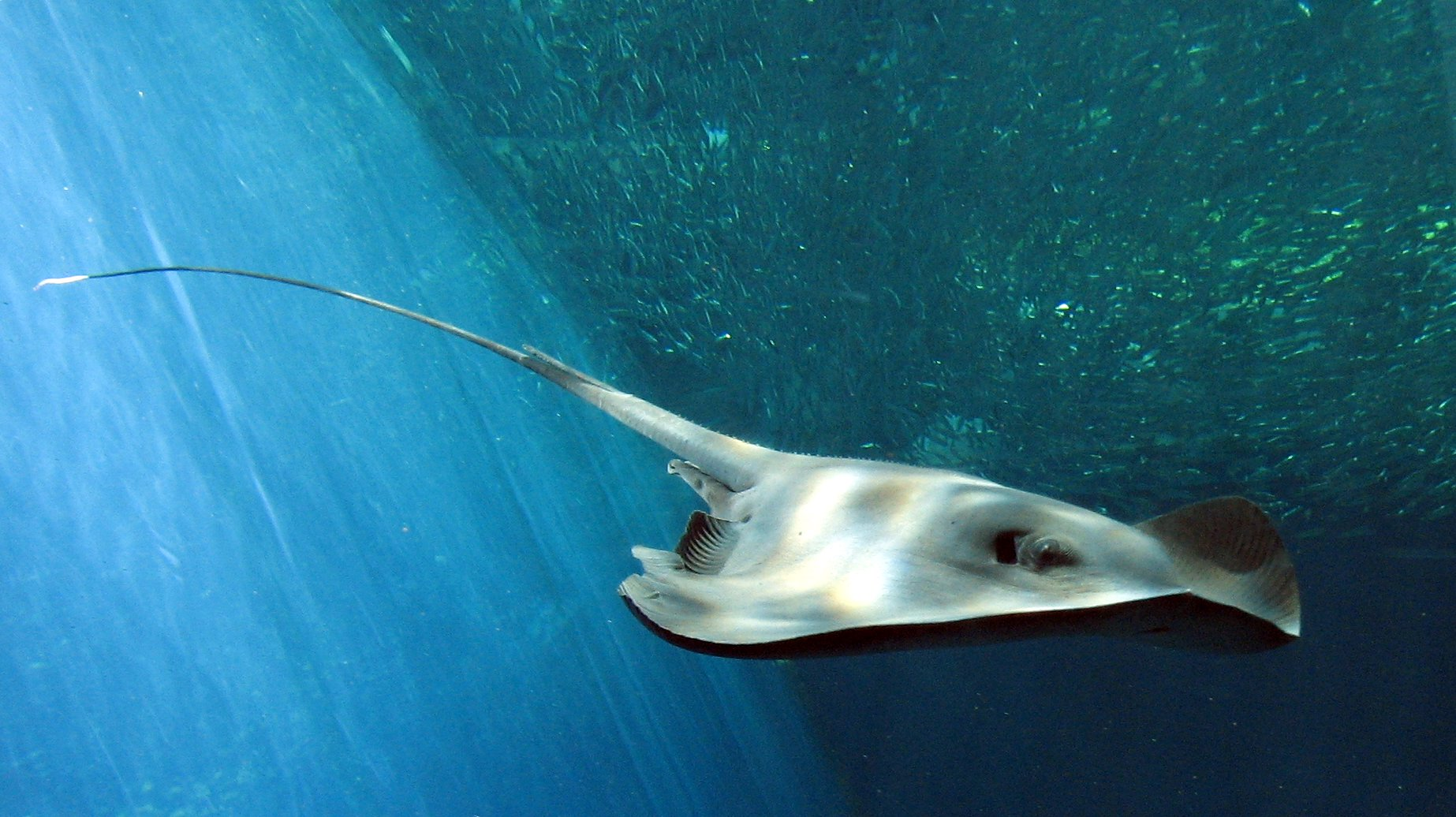
A pelagic stingray at Aquamarine Fukushima, Japan; this species adapts well to captivity.

The pelagic stingray is not aggressive and rarely encountered because of its habitat preferences, but its very long tail spine demands extreme caution be exercised in handling it. It has been responsible for two known fatalities: a worker on a tuna longliner who was impaled by a captured ray, and another fishery worker who succumbed to tetanus days after being stung. This species has been kept in public aquariums for almost a century.

Caught as bycatch in drifting longliners for tunas, billfishes and pelagic sharks, it is usually discarded due to its low commercial value. Rays incidentally caught on longlines suffer high mortality, as fishers are wary of being stung and remove the rays from the hooks by smashing them against the side of the boat, causing severe damage to the mouth and jaws. The extent of this bycatch has yet to be quantified. Surveys in the Pacific suggest that pelagic stingray numbers have increased since the 1950s, possibly due to commercial fisheries depleting the dominant predators in the ecosystem, such as sharks and tuna. The lack of population declines, coupled with its wide distribution and high reproductive rate, has led the International Union for Conservation of Nature (IUCN) to list this species under Least Concern. In June 2018 the New Zealand Department of Conservation classified the pelagic stingray as "Not Threatened" with the qualifier "Secure Overseas" under the New Zealand Threat Classification System.

Recent research has been conducted into reducing pelagic stingray bycatch on longlines by switching to larger and/or C-shaped hooks.
