= Groovebelly stingray =

Conservation status
- Endangered (IUCN 3.1)

Scientific classification
- Kingdom: Animalia
- Phylum: Chordata
- Class: Chondrichthyes
- Subclass: Elasmobranchii
- Order: Myliobatiformes
- Family: Dasyatidae
- Genus: Dasyatis
- Species: D. hypostigma

Binomial name
- Dasyatis hypostigma H. R. S. Santos & M. R. de Carvalho, 2004

Species of cartilaginous fish

The groovebelly stingray (Dasyatis hypostigma), referred to as the butter stingray by fishery workers, is a species of stingray in the family Dasyatidae. It is found over sandy or muddy bottoms in shallow coastal waters off southern Brazil, and probably Uruguay and Argentina. The groovebelly stingray can be distinguished by a prominent W-shaped furrow on its underside behind the last pair of gill slits, as well as completely smooth skin in all but the largest individuals. It reaches a maximum known width of 65 cm (26 in). This species is aplacental viviparous, with one observed female gestating two young. The main threat to its population is likely bycatch mortality from shrimp trawlers, although habitat degradation is also a concern.

== Taxonomy ==
Hugo Santos and Marcelo de Carvalho formally described the groovebelly stingray in a 2004 volume of Boletim do Museu Nacional, giving it the name Dasyatis hypostigma, from the Greek hypo ("ventral") and stigma ("mark"). The original publication sometimes used the spelling hipostigma, which was subsequently struck as incorrect by the authors, under the Principle of the First Reviser (International Code of Zoological Nomenclature Article 24.2). The type specimen is a 76 cm (30 in) long adult male trawled from off the Brazilian state of Paraná. Prior to its description, the groovebelly stingray specimens caught off Brazil have been misidentified as either the bluntnose stingray (D. say) or the common stingray (D. pastinaca), neither of which in fact occur in the region.

== Distribution and habitat ==
The groovebelly stingray is found along the coast of southern Brazil from Espírito Santo to Rio Grande do Sul, though it likely occurs as far north as Bahia and as far south as Mar del Plata, Argentina. It inhabits inshore waters at depths of 5–40 m (16–131 ft), though it has been reported from as far down as 80 m (260 ft). This benthic species favors sandy or muddy substrates, and may also enter estuaries.

== Description ==
The groovebelly stingray has a diamond-shaped pectoral fin disk slightly wider than long, with nearly straight front margins and a barely projecting snout tip. The eyes are large and protruding, and are immediately followed by wide, angular spiracles. There is a flap of skin between the nares with rounded corners and a fringed posterior margin. The mouth is small and the lower jaw is strongly bow-shaped. There are 37–46 upper and 43–50 lower tooth rows, with a quincunx arrangement. The teeth are blunt in juveniles and females, while in adult males the central teeth are slender and sharp. Adults have 3, 5, or 7 papillae in a row across the floor of the mouth. There is a distinctive W-shaped furrow on the underside behind the fifth pair of gill slits; only one other stingray, the pitted stingray (D. matsubarai), shares this feature.

The pelvic fins are pointed with slightly curving trailing margins, and extend just past the disk margin. The whip-like tail measures up to around one and a half times the disk length, with 1 (occasionally 2) serrated stinging spine positioned on top past the first third of the tail. There are fin folds running along the dorsal and ventral sides of the tail behind the spine; the upper fold is fleshier and less than half as long as the lower fold. In most individuals the skin is completely smooth, which distinguishes this species from the pitted stingray (which has spines on the back and tail); in the largest known female specimen, tiny denticles are scattered atop the disk around the tail base. The dorsal coloration is yellowish to greenish brown above, becoming more reddish towards the disk margins. The underside is white with dark fin margins, while the tail fin folds are black. This species attains a width of 65 cm (26 in).

== Biology and ecology ==
Older biological information available on the groovebelly stingray is confounded by its historical confusion with other species. Like other stingrays, the groovebelly stingray is aplacental viviparous: the embryos hatch inside the mother's uterus and are sustained by yolk, later supplemented by histotroph ("uterine milk") delivered by the mother into the embryos' spiracles via trophonemata (villi-like structures). Females have a single functional uterus (on the left). The only pregnant female thus far examined contained two embryos 55–56 mm (2.2–2.2 in) long, which were in an early stage of development.

== Human interactions ==
The groovebelly stingray is one of the most common stingrays caught unintentionally by artisanal and commercial shrimp bottom trawlers, mainly off Rio Grande do Sul, Santa Catarina, Paraná, São Paulo and Rio de Janeiro states. This species may also be negatively affected by habitat degradation from coastal development, and water pollution. Its conservation status is Endangered.
