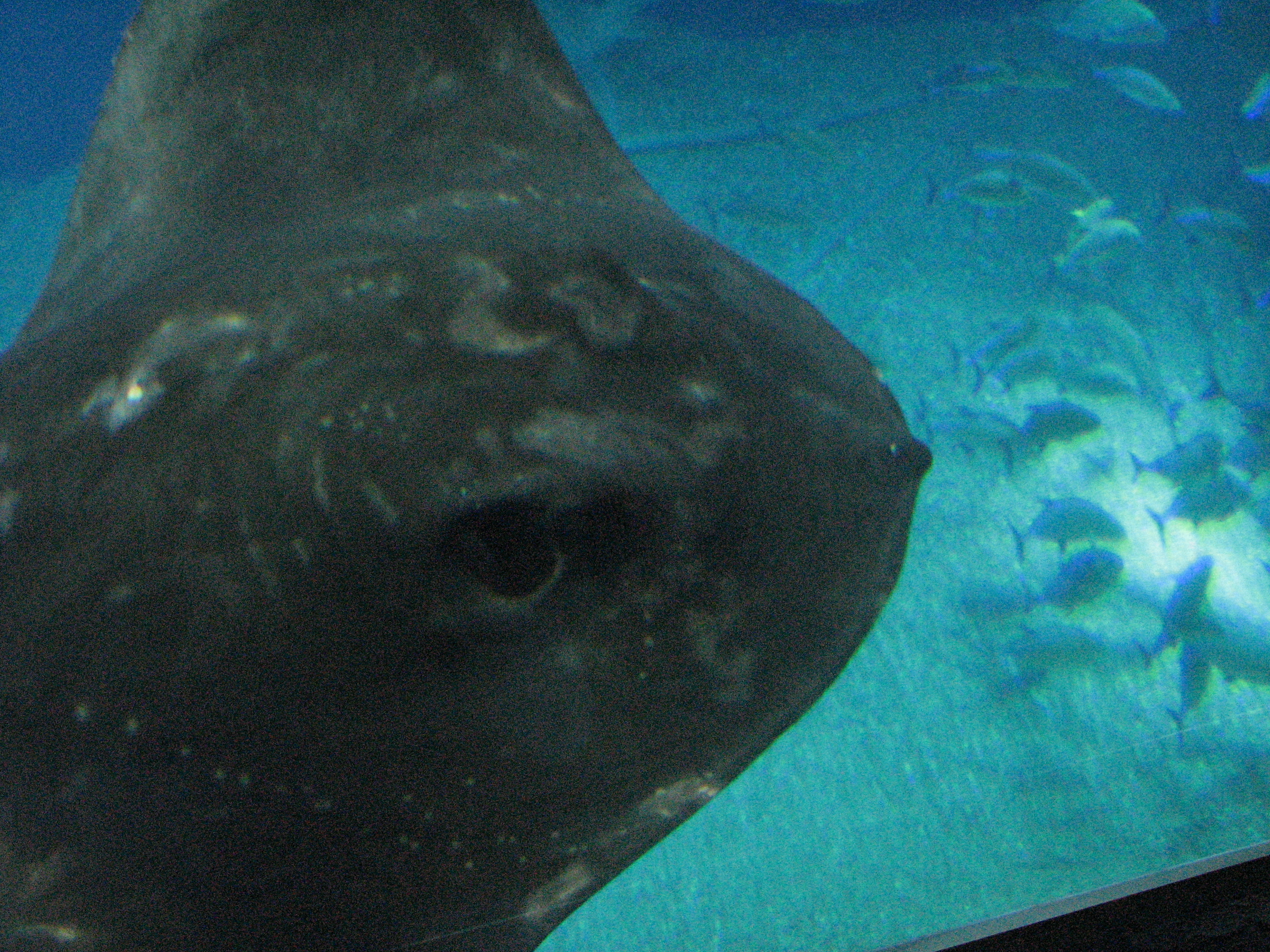

Conservation status
- Data Deficient (IUCN 3.1)

Scientific classification
- Kingdom: Animalia
- Phylum: Chordata
- Class: Chondrichthyes
- Subclass: Elasmobranchii
- Order: Myliobatiformes
- Family: Dasyatidae
- Genus: Dasyatis
- Species: D. matsubarai

Binomial name
- Dasyatis matsubarai (Miyosi, 1939)

Synonyms
- Bathytoshia brevicaudata

= Pitted stingray =

Species of cartilaginous fish

The pitted stingray (Dasyatis matsubarai) is a species of stingray in the family Dasyatidae, endemic to the waters around Japan and the Sea of Japan. It typically found near the coast at depths of 40–60 m (130–200 ft), but may also venture into the open sea. Measuring up to 2 m (6.6 ft) across, the pitted stingray has a diamond-shaped pectoral fin disc with a characteristic W-shaped groove on the underside. The total length including the tail has a record of 2.8 m (9.2 ft). Other identifying characteristics of this species include its dark gray dorsal coloration with small white spots, and the presence of dorsal tubercles in adults. Pitted stingrays are caught as bycatch in coastal fisheries and brought to market. The International Union for Conservation of Nature (IUCN) does not yet have sufficient data to assess this species beyond Data Deficient. This species is now regarded as a population of the Short-tail stingray (Bathytoshia brevicaudata).

== Taxonomy ==
Japanese ichthyologist Yasunori Miyosi described the pitted stingray in a 1939 issue of the Bulletin of the Biogeographical Society of Japan, based on a specimen collected from the Hyuga-nada Sea in eastern Miyazaki Prefecture, Japan. Nishida and Nakaya (1990) regarded the multispine giant stingray (D. multispinosa) as the same as this species, which was confirmed by the study of Last et al. (2016).

== Distribution and habitat ==
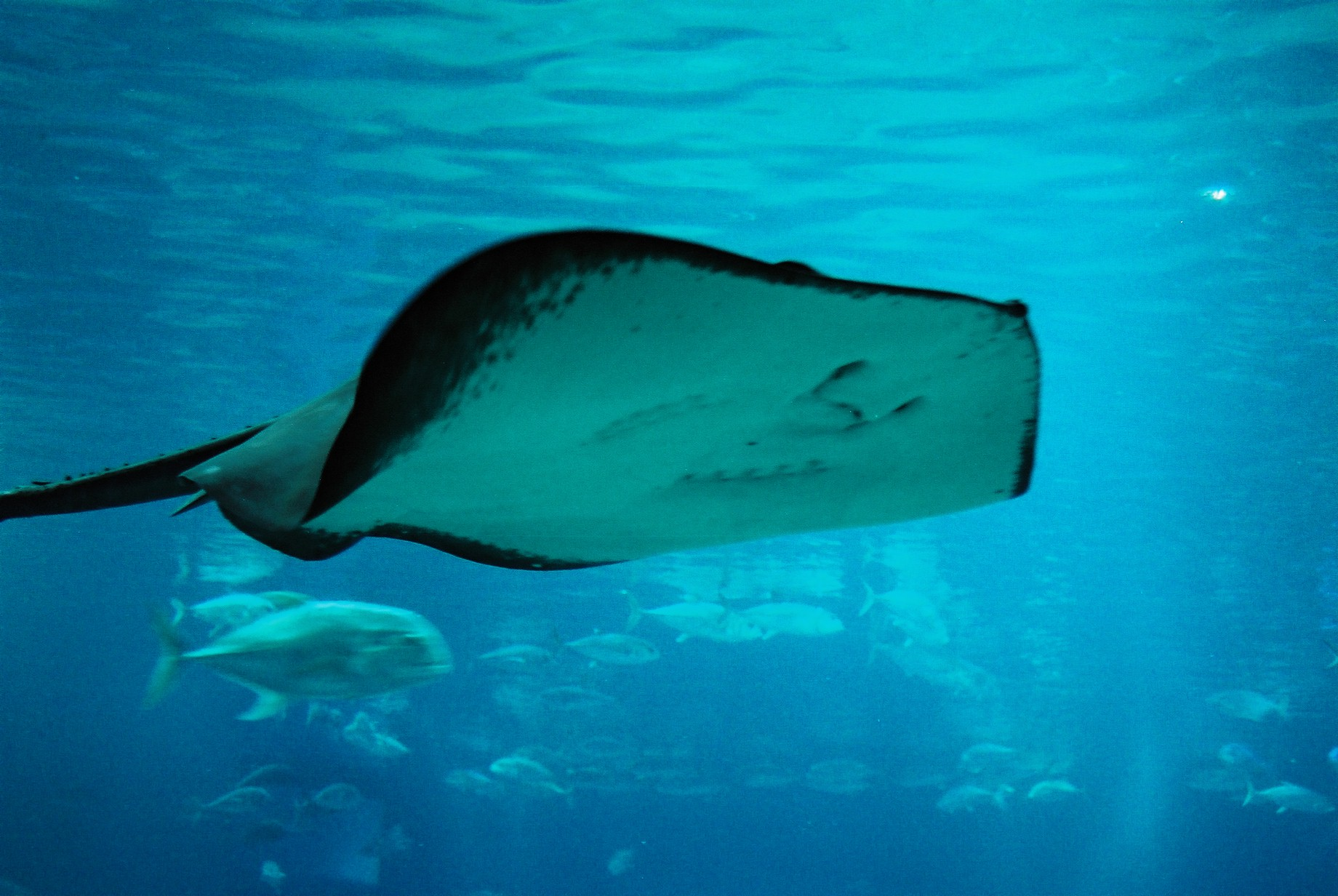
The pitted stingray may be semi-pelagic, swimming high in the water column.

The pitted stingray is found over the continental shelf around Japan, and is particularly abundant around Hokkaidō and northern Honshū. It has also been recorded from elsewhere in the Sea of Japan, near South Korea and Vladivostok, Russia. The pitted stingray is generally a bottom-dweller inhabiting coastal waters 40–60 m (130–200 ft) deep. However, the capture of one individual near the surface over water 3,000 m (9,800 ft) deep in the Sea of Japan suggests that this species may have pelagic habits as well.

== Description ==
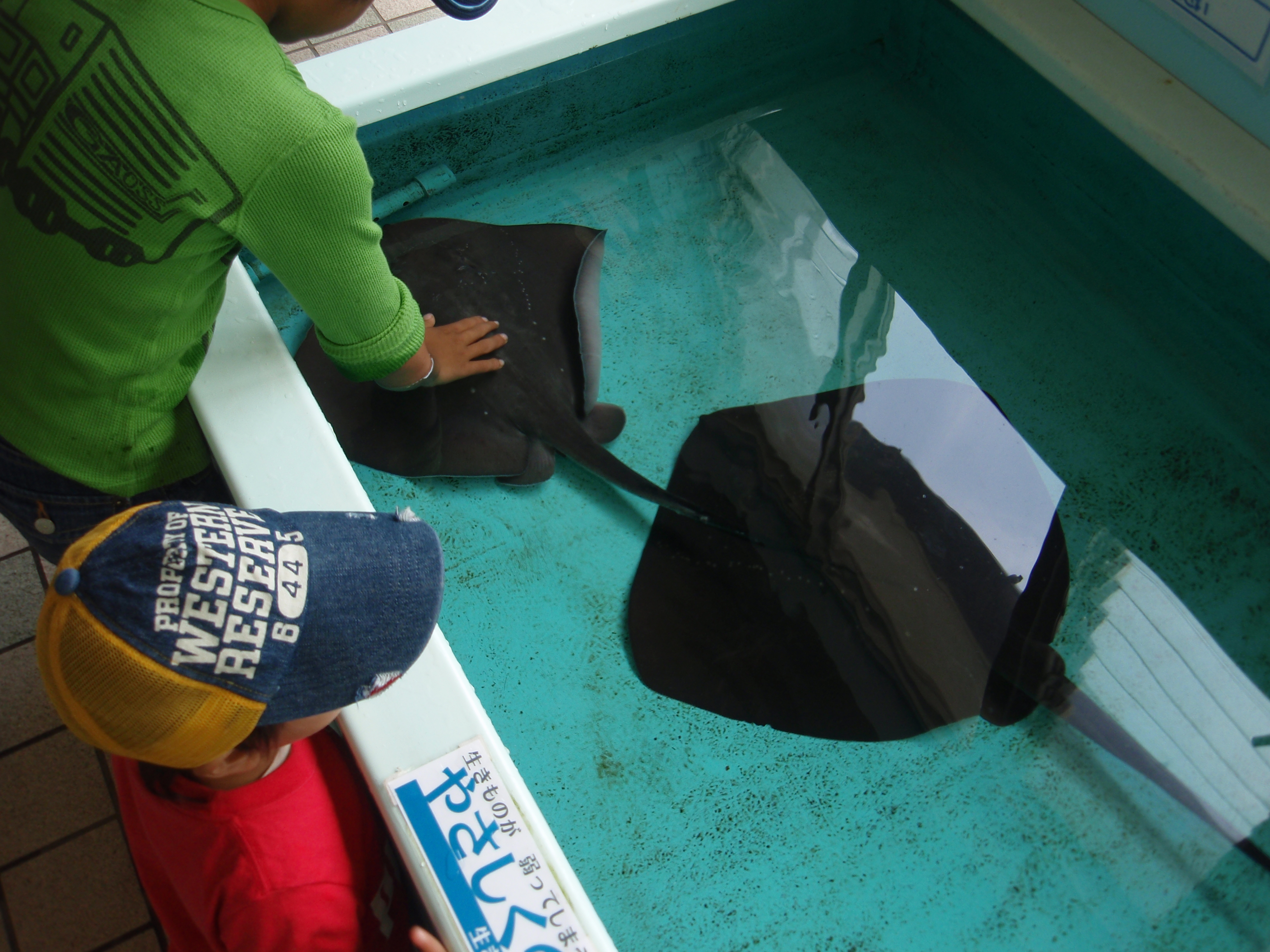
The pitted stingray is dark gray above, with small white spots.

The pitted stingray has a diamond-shaped pectoral fin disc wider than long, with almost straight leading margins converging to the tip of the snout at a blunt angle, and rounded trailing margins. The floor of the mouth contains anywhere from zero papillae to 12, arranged in three rows of 3, 7 and 2. There are 34–44 upper tooth rows and 33–46 lower tooth rows. There is a distinctive W-shaped furrow on the underside of the disc, at the center behind the fifth pair of gill slits. Only one other member of its family, the groovebelly stingray (D. hypostigma), shares this feature.

The tail is whip-like and measures 75–122% of the disc width, bearing 1–3 stinging spines on the upper surface. The tail spine averages 6.5 cm (2.6 in) long with 90 serrations in males, and 7.7 cm (3.0 in) long with 87 serrations in females. Behind the spine, there is a low dorsal keel and a ventral fin fold measuring less than half as long as the disc width. Mature individuals have a row of 2–10 tubercles on the snout tip, 3–5 tubercles on the back, and 1–8 tubercles before the spine. The tail is covered by dermal denticles towards the tip. This species is dark gray above, darkening on the tail fold, and white below with gray irregular spots and fin margins. The upper surface of the disc bears many small pores that are ringed in white. The pitted stingray attains a disc width of 2 m (6.6 ft). At Shima Marineland, a Japanese public aquarium, there is a record that individuals bred for 28 years have reached a disc width of 2.05 m (6.7 ft) and a total length of 2.85 m (9.4 ft).

== Biology and ecology ==
Little is known of the natural history of the pitted stingray. This species is parasitized by the praniza larvae of gnathiid isopods, which attach to the gills. Reproduction is presumably aplacental viviparous like other stingrays.

== Human interactions ==
The pitted stingray is caught incidentally by Japanese coastal fisheries, using longlines, gillnets, and set nets, and marketed for human consumption. However, the significance of this species in catches relative to other stingray species is unknown. As a result, the International Union for Conservation of Nature (IUCN) has listed it as Data Deficient.
