= Giant stumptail stingray =

Conservation status
- Data Deficient (IUCN 3.1)

Scientific classification
- Kingdom: Animalia
- Phylum: Chordata
- Class: Chondrichthyes
- Subclass: Elasmobranchii
- Order: Myliobatiformes
- Family: Dasyatidae
- Genus: Dasyatis
- Species: D. gigantea

Binomial name
- Dasyatis gigantea (Lindberg, 1930)

Synonyms
- Urolophoides giganteus Lindberg, 1930

Species of cartilaginous fish

The giant stumptail stingray (Dasyatis gigantea) is a species of stingray in the family Dasyatidae, known from only two specimens collected from the Peter the Great Bay in the Sea of Japan. This large species is characterized by rhomboid pectoral fin disc wider than long, a relatively long snout, and a short, blunt tail (though tail damage experienced by the original rays caught is a possibility). The International Union for Conservation of Nature (IUCN) has listed this species as Data Deficient and recommended further study.

== Taxonomy ==
Russian ichthyologist Georgii Ustinovich Lindberg published the description of the giant stumptail stingray in his and Soldatov's 1930 A Review of the Fishes of the Far-Eastern Seas. Lindberg created the new genus Urolophoides for this species, in reference to its short tail which resembles that of stingrays in the genus Urolophus. In 1990, Nishida and Nakaya placed Urolophoides in synonymy with Dasyatis. In 1999, Dolganov proposed that this species may be the same as the red stingray (D. akajei), though Eschmeyer's Catalog of Fishes regards this species as a synonym of the Short-tail stingray (Bathytoshia brevicaudata)

== Distribution and habitat ==
Both known specimens of the giant stumptail stingray were caught in the Peter the Great Bay off Askold Island, near Vladivostok.

== Description ==
Reaching 2.3 m (7.5 ft) long and 1.8 m (5.9 ft) across, the giant stumptail stingray has a diamond-shaped pectoral fin disc much wider than long. The head is short but the snout is relatively long and projecting, measuring a fifth as long as the disc is wide. The eyes are small and widely spaced, and are followed by larger spiracles. The pelvic fins are not covered by the disc. The tail is distinctive, being shorter than the disc and ending bluntly rather than tapering to a filament as in other Dasyatis species. However, Nishida and Nakaya (1990) consider that tail damage in stingrays is common and not always obvious. There are two stout, saw-toothed spines placed near the base of the tail, and behind them a ventral fin fold; different sources conflict on whether there is also a dorsal fin fold. The skin is largely smooth, except for numerous small dermal denticles over the posterior portion of the disc, the pelvic fins, and the base of the tail.

== Biology and ecology ==
Presently, virtually nothing is known of the giant stumptail stingray's natural history.

== Human interactions ==
As only two specimens have been found thus far, the International Union for Conservation of Nature (IUCN) lacks sufficient information to assess the giant stumptail stingray beyond Data Deficient. It is potentially threatened by coastal fisheries.
