= Shagreen =

Type of rawhide consisting of rough untanned skin

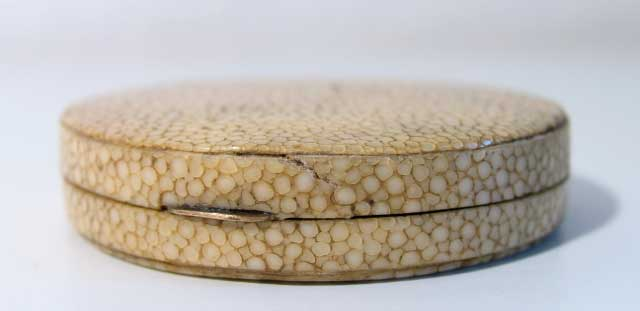
An antique round box covered with pearl ray shagreen, ground down to produce a smooth, puzzle-like surface

Shagreen is a type of rawhide consisting of rough untanned skin, historically from a horse's or onager's back, or from shark or ray.

== Etymology ==
The word derives from the French chagrin and is related to Italian zigrino and Venetian sagrin, derived from the Turkic sağrı / çağrı 'rump of a horse' or the prepared skin of this part. The roughness of its texture led to the French meaning of anxiety, vexation, embarrassment, or annoyance.

== Preparation and uses ==
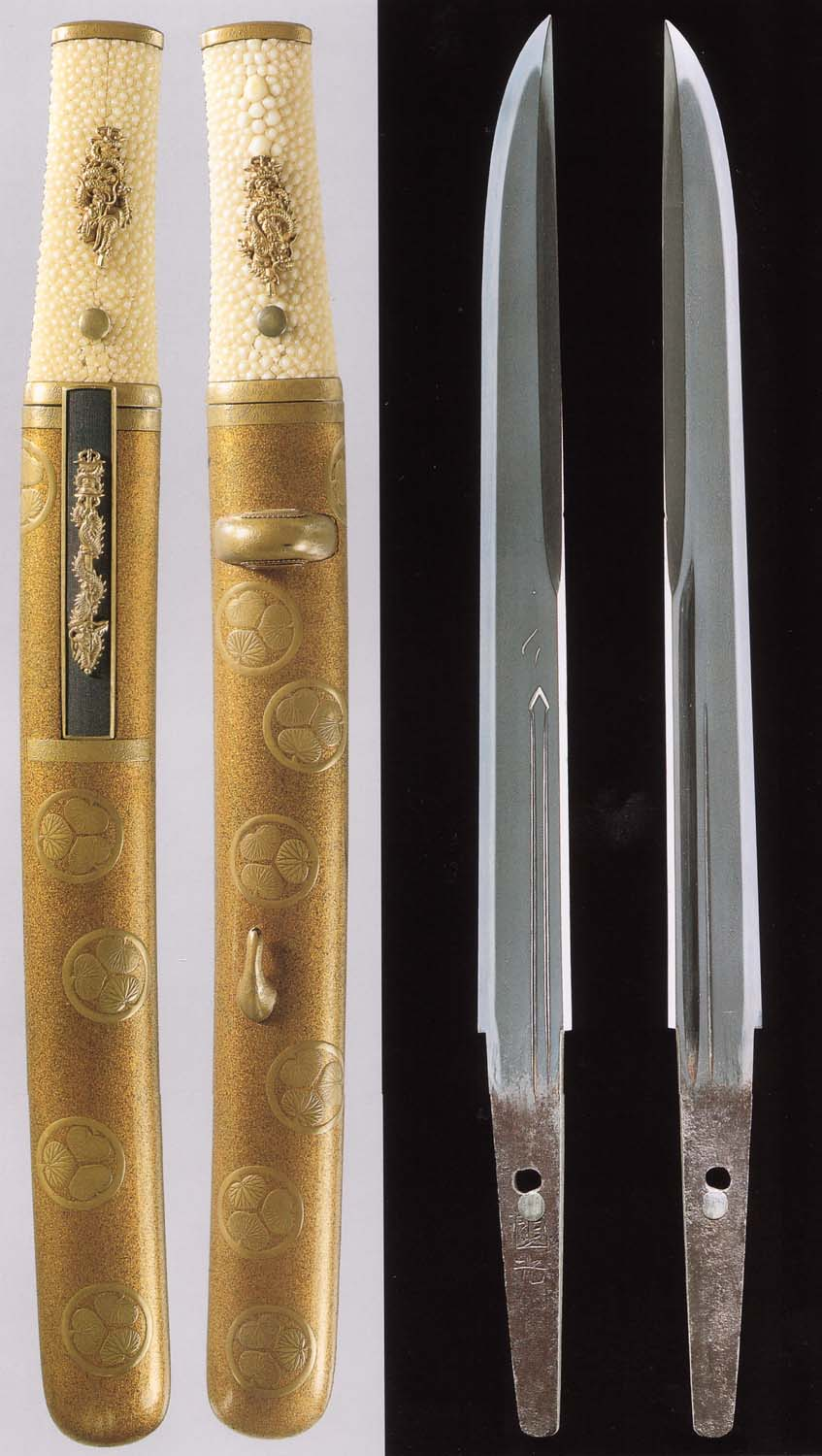
The white handle of this tantō (left) is covered with shagreen in its natural form.

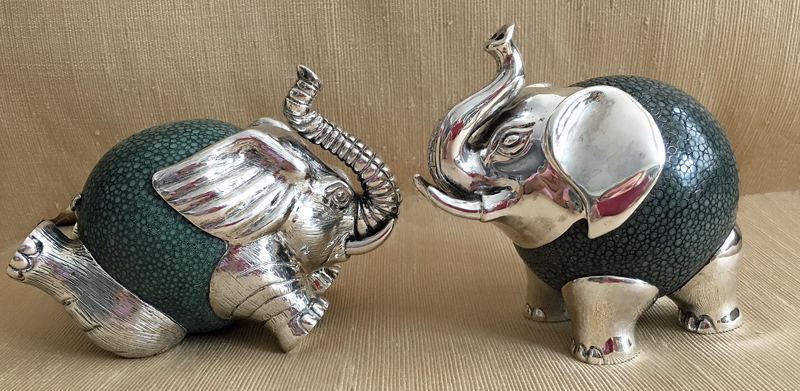
Two small decorative elephants made of silver and shagreen

Shagreen has an unusually rough and granular surface, and is sometimes used as a fancy leather for book bindings, pocketbooks and small cases, as well as its more utilitarian uses in the hilts and scabbards of swords and daggers, where slipperiness is a disadvantage.

In Asia, the Japanese tachi, katana, and wakizashi swords had their hilts almost always covered in undyed rawhide shagreen, while in China, shagreen, whose use dates back to the 2nd century CE, was traditionally used on Qing dynasty composite bows. Typically the ears and the spaces above and beneath the grip were covered by polished shagreen (in which the calcified papillae are reduced to equal height and form a uniform surface), sometimes with inlay work of different coloured shagreen. Shagreen was a very common cover for 19th-century reading glasses containers as well as other utensil boxes from China.

The early horse-skin variety of equine-based faux-shagreen was traditionally prepared by embedding plant seeds (often Chenopodium) in the untreated skin while soft, covering the skin with a cloth, and trampling them into the skin. When the skin was dry, the seeds were shaken off, leaving the surface of the leather covered with small indentations. Sources are not clear whether this was being done to imitate pearl ray-skin shagreen from East Asia or if the technique was developed separately.

In the 17th and early 18th centuries, the term "shagreen" began to be applied to leather made from sharkskin or the skin of a rayfish (probably the pearled ray, Hypolophus sephen). This form is also termed sharkskin or galuchat. Such skins are naturally covered with round, closely set, calcified papillae called placoid scales, whose size is chiefly dependent on the age and size of the animal. These scales are ground down to give a roughened surface of rounded pale protrusions, between which the dye (again, typically green vegetable dye) shows when the material is coloured from the other side. This latter form of shagreen was first popularised in Europe by fr:Jean-Claude Galluchat (d. 1774), a master leatherworker in the court of Louis XV of France. It quickly became a fashion amongst the French aristocracy, and migrated throughout Europe by the mid-18th century. "The appeal of shagreen in Europe was closely bound up with the way the translucent skin absorbs colour, but in Japan, its whiteness was the measure of value".

Scholars concur that its popularity in Central Asia, where green footwear made of shagreen was popular into the 19th century, probably came as the result of its introduction from China, perhaps during the 16th century rule of Suleiman the Magnificent. Three items made of shagreen can be found in the Topkapi Palace collection.

Since the 18th century shagreen has typically been used for covering portable items such as luggage, toilet cases and other boxes, the hard and robust looking finish seeming to assure its reputation for standing up to rough handling; Book coverings are also known as well as larger pieces of furniture. The water-resistant qualities ascribed to the finish are probably why there are many toiletry cases and associated objects such as shaving kits, snuff boxes and other items of a personal nature. The restrained look of the skin was felt to be very suitable for men.

Items continued to be manufactured during the 19th century, usually influenced by 18th century examples. There was a definite resurgence in items being made during the 1920s and 1930s, the clean hard finish and traditional pale green tone lending itself very well to the prevailing Art-deco style. Many of these items are designed along modernist lines with little 18th century influence. A broad range of items date from this period, including furniture and luggage.

In the 1970s, shagreen became fashionable again, partly due to the renewed interest in the art deco period. A range of items, including furniture such as small tables, have been manufactured since then, providing work for a small number of craftspeople catering to the luxury market. Small decorative items made of shagreen and silver have become popular in Southeast Asia; most are manufactured by high-end design studios in Thailand.

Even now, shagreen products continue to be used occasionally as decorative furnishings, particularly in luxury homes and are popular products amongst interior designers. Examples include shagreen photo frames, decorative boxes and jewelry holders. Another popular application of shagreen has been using it to create a vide poche (French for 'empty pockets'), designed to hold small essentials such as keys, money and anything else you might typically need to 'empty from your pockets' when you arrive somewhere like home.

== Medicine ==
In medicine, a shagreen patch is a patch of shagreen-like rough skin, often on the lower back, found in some people with the genetic condition tuberous sclerosis.

== See also ==
- La Peau de chagrin (19th century novel by Balzac)
