= Pastinachus gracilicaudus =

Conservation status
- Endangered (IUCN 3.1)

Scientific classification
- Kingdom: Animalia
- Phylum: Chordata
- Class: Chondrichthyes
- Subclass: Elasmobranchii
- Order: Myliobatiformes
- Family: Dasyatidae
- Genus: Pastinachus
- Species: P. gracilicaudus

Binomial name
- Pastinachus gracilicaudus Last & Manjaji-Matsumoto, 2010

Species of stingray

Pastinachus gracilicaudus, the narrow cowtail ray, is a type of cowtail ray patchily found in Indo-Malay Archipelago. It lives in the continental insular shelves of up to 60 m depth.

== Description ==
The narrow cowtail ray possesses several characteristics, including rounded snout, 120-122 pectoral fin radials, 37-40 monospondylous vertebral centra, and the presence of 2 large midscapular pearl thorns. It can reach the maximum size of 83 cm disc width. Its reproduction is believed to be viviparous and the birth-size might be 19 - 26 cm disc width.

== Habitat & distribution ==
This demersal species is usually found on the coastal regions at the depths of 1 - 60 m. Its exact habitat is quite patchy, being believed to be both Indonesian and Malaysian Borneo, Sumatra, Java, and Malay Peninsula. Several possible threats that directly affect this species are sea pollution, climate change, and over-fishing.
