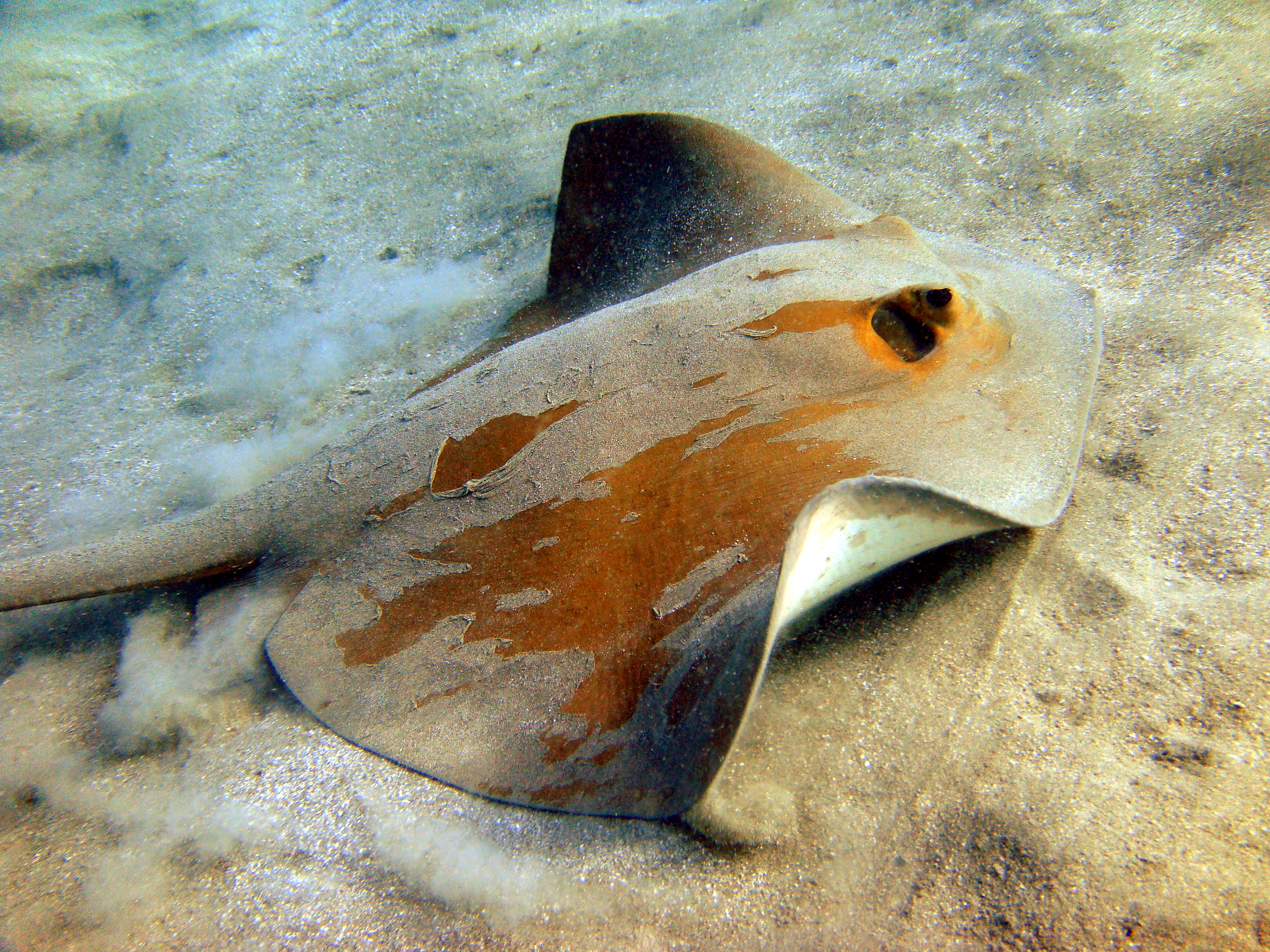
- Cowtail stingray off Marsa Alam, Egypt

Conservation status
- Near Threatened (IUCN 3.1)

Scientific classification
- Kingdom: Animalia
- Phylum: Chordata
- Class: Chondrichthyes
- Subclass: Elasmobranchii
- Order: Myliobatiformes
- Family: Dasyatidae
- Genus: Pastinachus
- Species: P. sephen

Binomial name
- Pastinachus sephen (Forsskål, 1775)

Synonyms
- Dasybatus gruveli Chabanaud, 1923; Raja sancur Hamilton, 1822; Raja sephen Forsskål, 1775; Taeniura atra Macleay, 1883; Trigon forskalii Rüppell, 1829

= Cowtail stingray =

Species of cartilaginous fish

The cowtail stingray (Pastinachus sephen) is a species of stingray in the family Dasyatidae, widespread in the Indo-Pacific region and occasionally entering freshwater habitats. Other common names include banana-tail ray, drab stingray, fantail ray, feathertail stingray, and frill tailed sting ray. This species is sometimes placed in the genus Dasyatis or Hypolophus (an obsolete synonym of Pastinachus). The most distinctive characteristic of the cowtail stingray is the large, flag-like ventral fold on its tail, which is especially prominent when the ray is swimming. This species is targeted by commercial fisheries as a source of high-quality shagreen, a type of leather, and its populations are now under threat from heavy exploitation.

== Distribution and habitat ==
The cowtail stingray has a widespread distribution in the tropical waters of the Indo-Pacific, from South Africa and the Red Sea to Japan and Australia, including Melanesia and Micronesia. They are amphidromous and known to enter estuaries and rivers. This species is the most commonly reported stingray from fresh water in Southeast Asia, and there is a record from the Ganges River some 2,200 km (1,400 mi) from the sea. They are usually found on sandy bottoms in coastal waters and on coral reefs to a depth of 60 meters (200 feet).

== Description ==
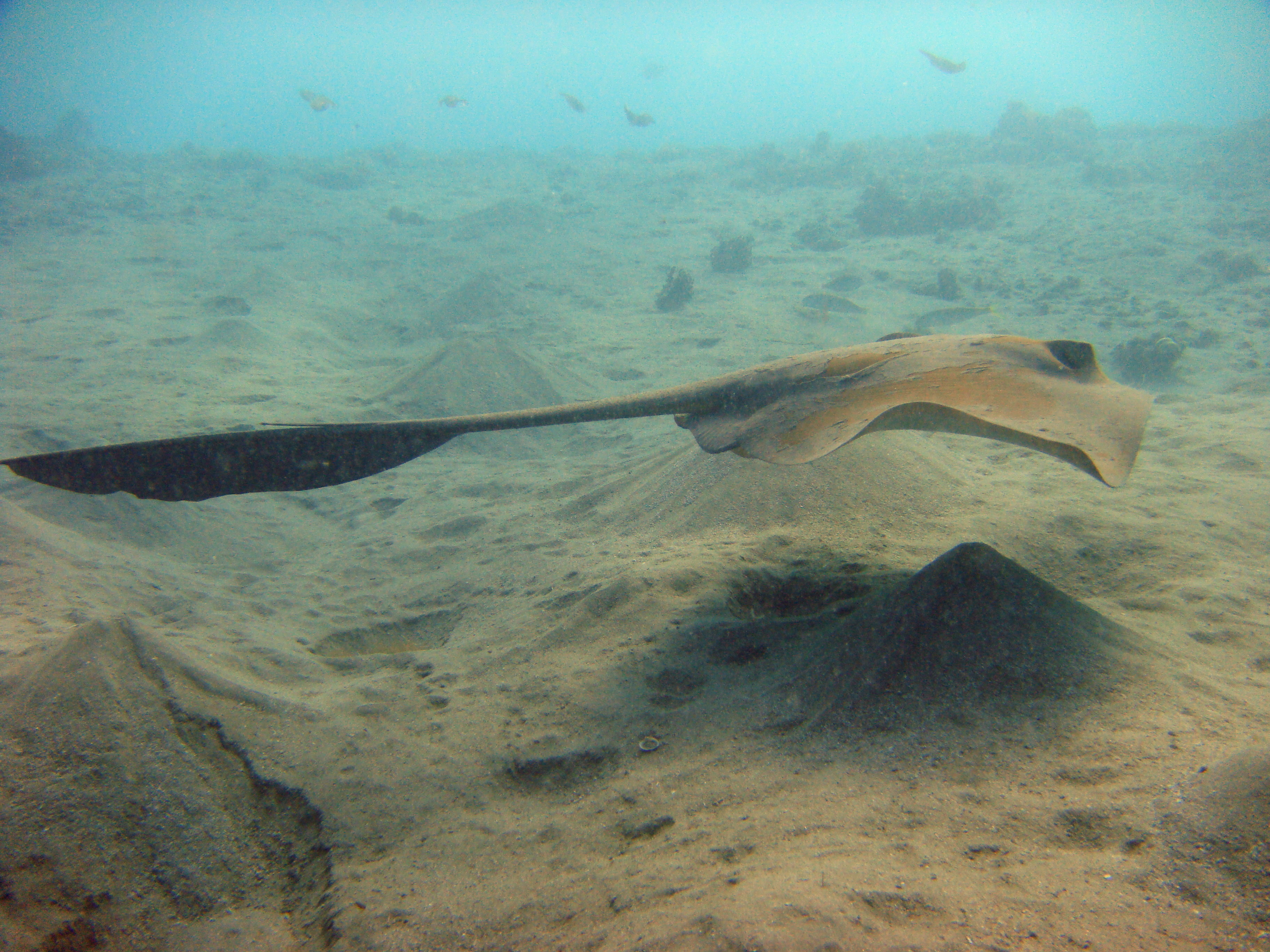
Swimming cowtail stingray, showing ventral tail fold.

The pectoral fin disk of the cowtail stingray is very thick, with almost straight anterior margins and rounded apices, and measuring 1.1-1.3 times as long as wide. The snout is broadly rounded and blunt. The eyes are very small and widely spaced. The mouth is narrow, with 20 rows of distinctive hexagonal, high-crowned teeth in each jaw and five papillae on the mouth floor. The tail is broad-based, with a filamentous tip and a single venomous spine located well backwards of the pelvic fins. There is no upper tail fold; the high ventral tail fold measures 2-3 times the height of the tail but does not reach the tip.

The disk surface is covered by a broad band of fine dermal denticles extending from near the tip of the snout to the upper surface of the tail, excluding the extreme margins of the disk. Newborns are entirely smooth but develop denticles quickly after birth. Juveniles have four circular tubercles at the center of the disk, which often become indistinct in adults. The coloration is a uniform grayish brown to black above and mostly white below. The tail fold and tip are black. This species may reach 3 meters (9.8 feet) long and 1.8 meters (5.9 feet) across, and 250 kg (550 lb) in weight.

== Biology and ecology ==
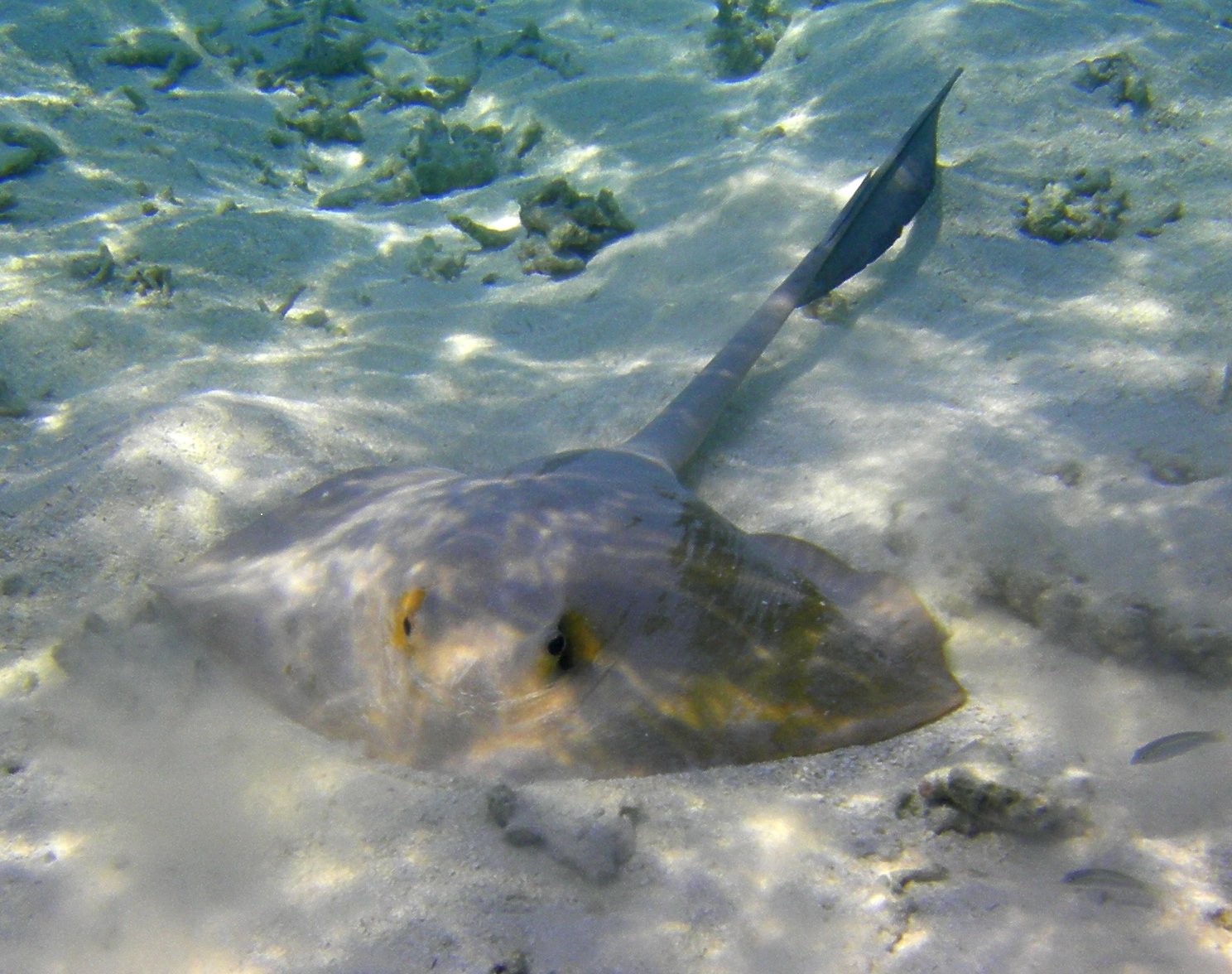
Cowtail stingray on a sand flat.

Cowtail stingrays are solitary foragers that feed on bony fishes (including leiognathids, Nemipterus, and soles), crustaceans, polychaete worms, sipunculids, and molluscs. The cowtail stingray is in turn preyed upon by various species of hammerhead and requiem sharks, as well as by the bottlenose dolphin (Tursiops aduncus). When threatened, they consistently flee at a 45° angle away from the predator, a trajectory that allows them to maximize the distance covered while still keeping the predator within their field of vision.

Like other stingrays, reproduction in this species is ovoviviparous, with the embryos sustained in late development by histotroph ("uterine milk") delivered via specialized structures. The females giving birth to live young measuring 18 cm (7.1 in) across or more. Single young individuals have been reported year-round in the Strait of Malacca; juveniles have more pointed snouts than adults. Adults are sometimes accompanied by remoras or trevallies. Known parasites of the cowtail stingray include Dendromonocotyle ardea, Decacotyle tetrakordyle, and Pterobdella amara.

Observations of cowtail stingrays in Shark Bay, Australia, show that this species enters shallow, sandy flats during high tide to rest for a minimum of four hours. They often form small groups when resting, particularly when visibility is poor such as in turbid water or under low light conditions. The typical size of such groups is three individuals (larger groups, up to nine, are rare), arranged in a "rosette" formation with their tails pointing outward. This appears to be an anti-predator behavior, as the close circular arrangement of the rays allows them to see predators approaching from any direction. The rosette also orients their less critical tails, containing mechanoreceptors that comprise a secondary warning system, towards potential threats. The members of the group will flee in concert, reducing a predator's ability to target any one individual. Cowtail stingrays also preferentially form mixed-species groups with reticulate whiprays (Himantura uarnak), likely because the whiprays are better able to detect predators due to their longer tails.

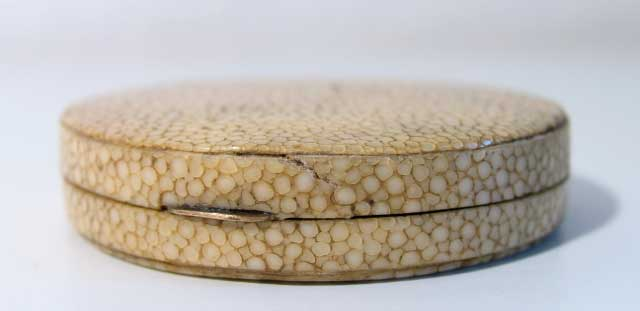
An antique round box covered with galuchat.

== Relationship to humans ==
The serrated spine of the cowtail stingray is potentially dangerous, and this species is regarded as particularly dangerous to handle as its long tail is capable of reaching over its back to strike someone gripping it from the front. Small to moderate numbers of cowtail stingrays are caught as bycatch in trawls and marketed for meat throughout their range, and their tough skin is used to polish wood. This species is also the primary source of shagreen or galuchat, a type of leather, for which it has been valued since ancient times due to the large size and regular arrangement of its dorsal tubercles (called "pearls" in the trade from their nacreous appearance after being rubbed down, hence the old name "pearled ray").

A boom in the international shagreen trade since the 1990s, with the material being used in many fashion accessories from wallets to fancy pens, has led to enormous numbers of cowtail stingrays being harvested in Southeast Asia. As stingrays are slow-reproducing, long-lived animals, there are fears that this unregulated exploitation is unsustainable and will lead to a population collapse.
