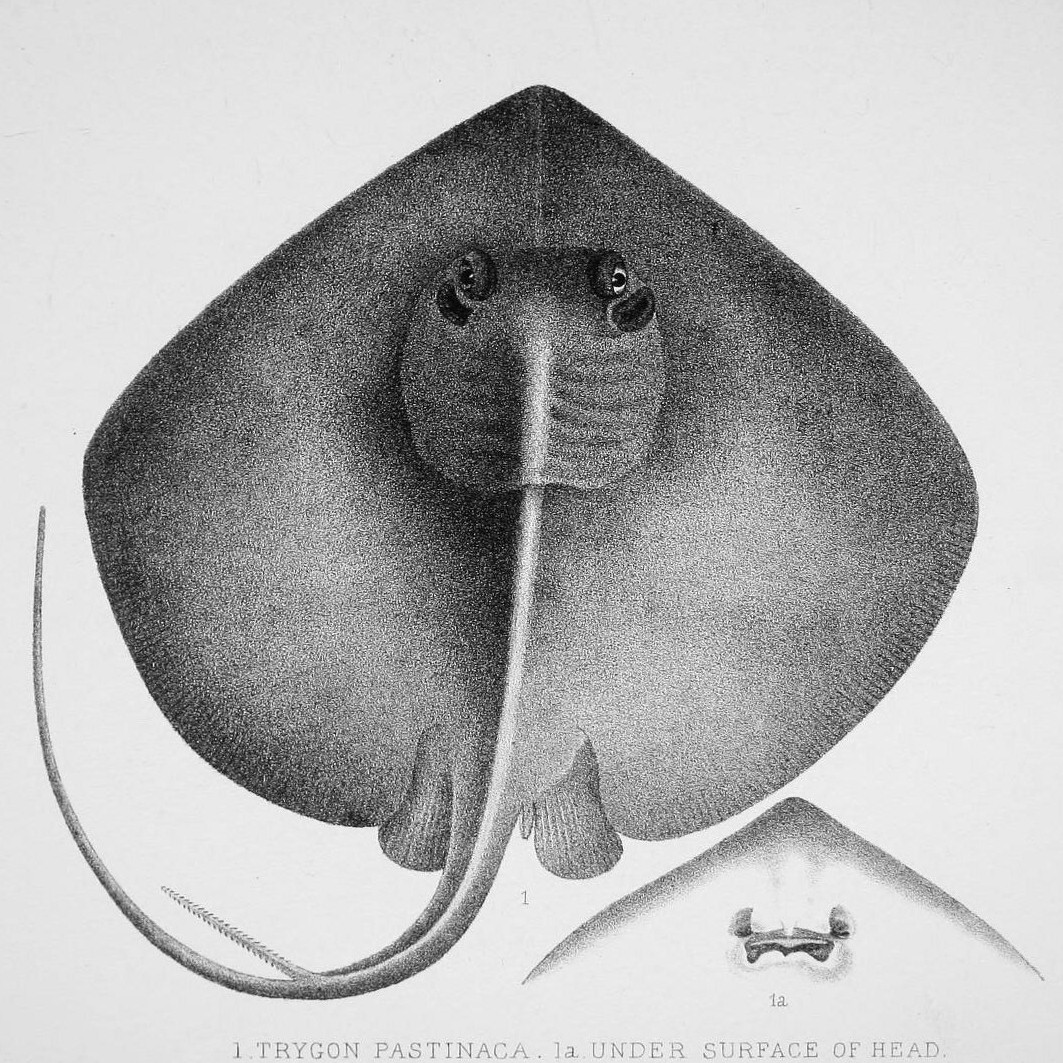

Conservation status
- Near Threatened (IUCN 3.1)

Scientific classification
- Kingdom: Animalia
- Phylum: Chordata
- Class: Chondrichthyes
- Subclass: Elasmobranchii
- Order: Myliobatiformes
- Family: Dasyatidae
- Genus: Dasyatis
- Species: D. chrysonota

Binomial name
- Dasyatis chrysonota (A. Smith, 1828)

= Blue stingray =

Species of cartilaginous fish

The blue stingray (Dasyatis chrysonota) is a species of whiptail stingray of the family Dasyatidae often found in the coastal waters of southern Africa.

== Distribution and similar species ==
The species' common geographical distribution ranges from St. Lucia on the southern tip of Africa up to Angola and a depth distribution ranging from the surf zone to 110m depth. Although this is the typical geographical distribution, the species has also been found off the Mediterranean coast of Israel and in the Gulf of Gabčs in southern Tunisia. D. chrysonota is easily distinguishable from other stingray species by the appearance of faint blue splotches and lines on its light-brown triangular disc body.

== Growth and appearance ==
Their disc can reach a maximum width of approximately 75 cm. There are four size classes: small, medium, large, and very large. The ranges of each size class are as follows: small = <30 cm, medium = 30–45 cm, large = 45–60 cm, very large = >60 cm. The size of male and female blue stingray show no distinction from birth until adolescence (approximately 4 years old) in which sexual differences become noticeable. Once this threshold is reached, females exhibit a faster growth rate than males. The minimum age-at-maturity is 5 for males and 7 for females. Age estimates of D. chrysonota are often made based on the vertebral centra which exhibits narrow dark bands and wide translucent bands that create a bunching effect. Seasonal fluctuations in temperature and light are likely significant controlling factors in growth rate and band formation. Months with warm temperatures often show higher growth rates than months with cold temperatures. One opaque and one translucent band is formed annually when the stingray is kept in captivity, which is also true for other closely related species such as Dasyatis dipterura, the diamond stingray.

== Diet and feeding habits ==
The species occupies different habitats throughout their lifetime and although they may feed on a wide variety of prey items, the proportions of the different prey could vary among different life stages and corresponding size classes. This could be a result of what is and isn't accessible to a small stingray versus a relatively large stingray that is able to dig deeper into sediment and extract particular types of prey like the bat ray (Myliobatis californica) is able to do. D. chrysonota feed on a wide variety of benthic epifauna and infauna with an opportunistic feeding strategy. Although primary prey type changes between size classes of the stingray and the habitat that it feeds in, the main prey groups are crustaceans, molluscs, polychaetes and hemichordates. Crustaceans and molluscs are the most common prey among other closely related species of stingray. The feeding process includes prey searching, prey detection, and prey capture. Prey is searched for by gliding along the surface of the ocean, and once it is found the stingray lands upon the prey and the prey is drawn into its mouth with use of the jaw. The medium and large size classes of D. chrysonota are important predators in the nearshore sandy beach ecosystem in the surf zone of southern African waters, however the majority of prey for the very large class size is found nearshore and offshore, mostly consisting of Callianassa spp. which does not occur in the surf zone.

== Reproduction ==
Sexual maturity of males is reached at a smaller size and at an earlier age than that of females. The reproductive cycle of the male blue stingray indicates a peak in sperm production from the month of September until December, resulting in a mating season consisting mostly of the austral spring and some of the austral summer. D. chrysonota have a relatively low fecundity which ranges from 1 to 7, with an average of 2–3 embryos per litter. Unlike other related ray species, a strong maternal size to litter size relationship does not exist. This may be related to uterus capacity of this species. Courtship and mating behavior of D. chrysonota is a rare occurrence. The species follows an annual reproductive cycle with birth following a nine-month gestation period. Ovulation appears to start soon after parturition, with ovulation and hence fertilization occurring between January and April. An offshore winter migratory pattern in which the rays are found inshore in the summer and disperse offshore during winter months coincides with their reproductive seasonality. Large ovarian eggs may range from 8–14 mm in diameter. The reproductive success of D. chrysonota is low based on average fecundity and active reproductive life span.

== Value to humans ==
D. chrysonota is a popular target species for recreational and competitive rock and surf anglers as well as recreational ski boat fishers. The species is at risk of over-exploitation as there is currently no proper management strategy in place for the protection of the species.
