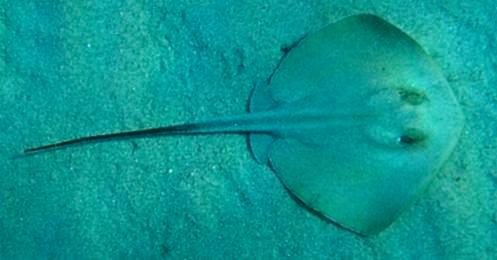

Conservation status
- Data Deficient (IUCN 3.1)

Scientific classification
- Kingdom: Animalia
- Phylum: Chordata
- Class: Chondrichthyes
- Subclass: Elasmobranchii
- Order: Myliobatiformes
- Family: Dasyatidae
- Genus: Dasyatis
- Species: D. tortonesei

Binomial name
- Dasyatis tortonesei Capapé, 1975

= Tortonese's stingray =

Species of cartilaginous fish

Tortonese's stingray (Dasyatis tortonesei) is a species of stingray of the family Dasyatidae. It occurs in the eastern Atlantic from Morocco to Mauritania, and is also found in the Mediterranean Sea.
