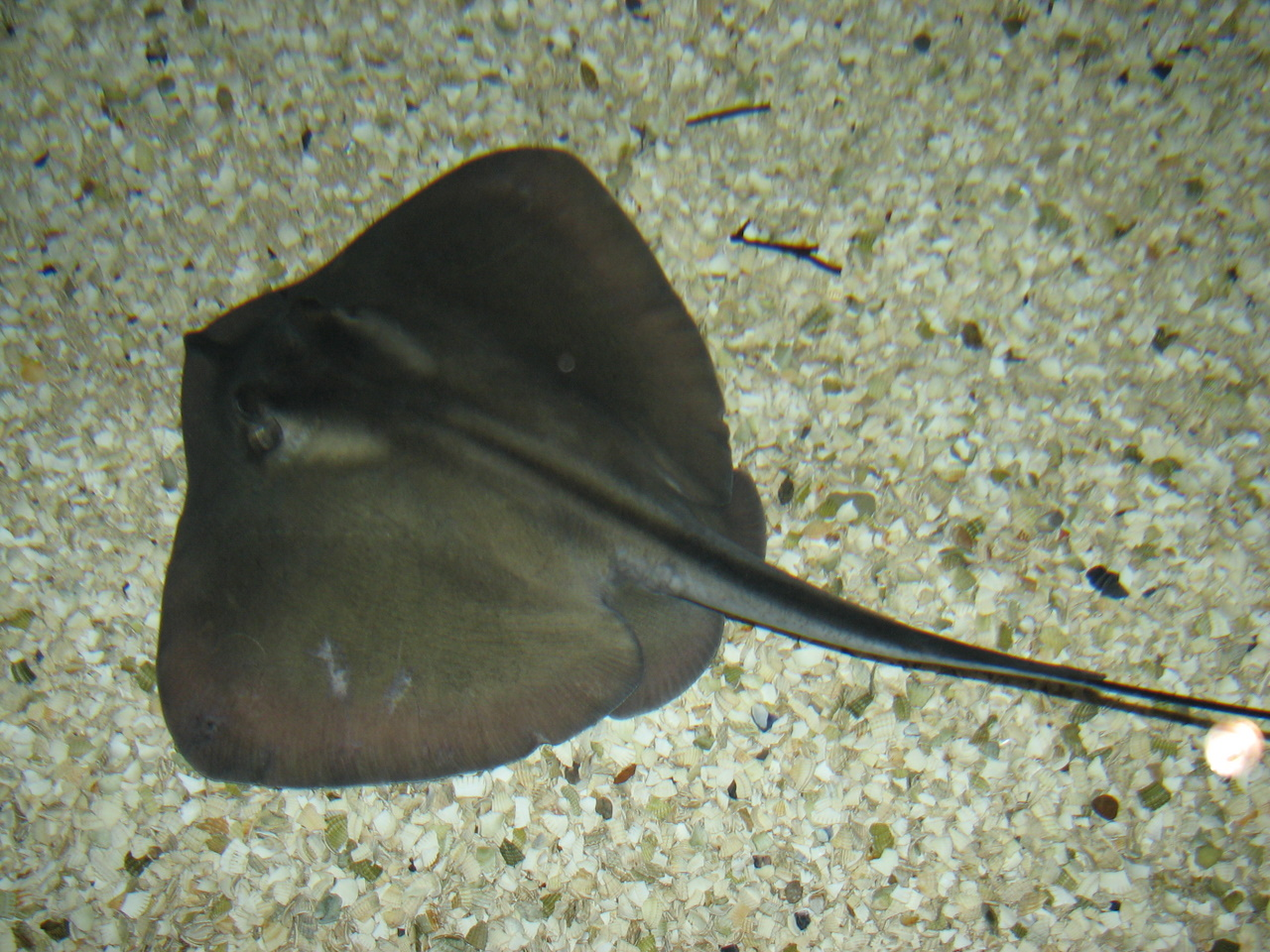
- Common stingray (D. pastinaca)

Scientific classification
- Kingdom: Animalia
- Phylum: Chordata
- Class: Chondrichthyes
- Subclass: Elasmobranchii
- Order: Myliobatiformes
- Family: Dasyatidae
- Subfamily: Dasyatinae
- Genus: Dasyatis; Rafinesque, 1810

Type species
- Raja pastinaca Linnaeus, 1758

Synonyms
- Amphotistius Garman, 1913; Anacanthus Cuvier, 1829 (ex Ehrenberg); Dasyatus (lapsus); Dasybatus Garman (ex Klein), 1885; Dasybatus Klein, 1775; Desyatis (lapsus); Pastinaca Swainson, 1838; Trygon Cuvier (ex Adanson), 1816; Trygonobatus Blainville, 1816; Urolophoides Lindberg, 1930

= Dasyatis =

Dasyatis Temporal range: 136.4–0 Ma Early Cenomanian to Present

Genus of cartilaginous fishes

Dasyatis (Greek δασύς dasýs meaning rough or dense and βατίς batís meaning skate) is a genus of stingray in the family Dasyatidae that is native to the Atlantic, including the Mediterranean. In a 2016 taxonomic revision, many of the species formerly assigned to Dasyatis were reassigned to other genera (Bathytoshia, Fontitrygon, Hemitrygon, Hypanus, Megatrygon and Telatrygon).

== Species ==
- Dasyatis chrysonota A. Smith, 1828 (blue stingray)
- Dasyatis gigantea (Lindberg, 1930) (giant stumptail stingray)
- Dasyatis hypostigma H. R. S. Santos & M. R. de Carvalho, 2004 (groovebelly stingray)
- Dasyatis marmorata Steindachner, 1892 (marbled stingray)
- Dasyatis pastinaca Linnaeus, 1758 (common stingray)
- Dasyatis tortonesei Capapé, 1975 (Tortonese's stingray)

Fossil species, data from Fossilworks

- †Dasyatis africana Arambourg, 1948 or Dartevelle and Casier, 1959
- †Dasyatis borodini
- †Dasyatis branisai
- †Dasyatis carolinensis
- †Dasyatis cavernosa
- †Dasyatis charlisae
- †Dasyatis concavifoveus
- †Dasyatis dezignoi
- †Dasyatis gigas
- †Dasyatis hexagonalis
- †Dasyatis manuelcamposi
- †Dasyatis molassicus
- †Dasyatis molinoensis
- †Dasyatis probsti
- †Dasyatis rafinesquei
- †Dasyatis rugosa
- †Dasyatis russelli
- †Dasyatis schaefferi
- †Dasyatis serralheiroi
- †Dasyatis sessaoensis
- †Dasyatis strangulata
- †Dasyatis tetraedra
- †Dasyatis vicaryi
- †Dasyatis wochadunensis

== See also ==
- List of prehistoric cartilaginous fish
