= Atlantitrygon =

Atlantitrygon Temporal range: Thanetian– Lutetian

Scientific classification
- Domain: Eukaryota
- Kingdom: Animalia
- Phylum: Chordata
- Class: Chondrichthyes
- Subclass: Elasmobranchii
- Order: Myliobatiformes
- Family: Potamotrygonidae
- Subfamily: Styracurinae
- Genus: †Atlantitrygon; Sambou et al. 2020

Type species
- Dasyatis sudrei Cappetta, 1972

Extinct genus of river stingray

Atlantitrygon is an extinct genus of marine river stingray from the Paleogene period. It currently contains two species known only from isolated teeth. A. sudrei is known from the Thanetian-aged Gorgol formation of Niger and deposits of similar age in Togo and Senegal. It was originally ascribed to the genus Dasyatis. A. senegalensis is found in the lower Lutetian Matam formation of Senegal and possibly the Ypresian sites of Tamaguilet, Mali and Ouled Abdoun, Morocco. It appears to be part of the River ray family and has been tentatively placed alongside the two extant marine species in the subfamily Styracurinae. However, this placement is uncertain.
