= P. rex =

P. rex may refer to:

- Papilio rex, the regal swallowtail, a butterfly species found in Africa
- Pedicularis rex, a plant related to lousewort
- Percina rex, the Roanoke logperch, a small freshwater fish species found in the Roanoke and Chowan drainages
- Potamotrygon rex, the great river stingray, a freshwater stingray species native to the Rio Tocantins in Brazil
- Pseudoeurycea rex, a salamander species found mostly in Guatemala and Mexico

== See also ==
- Rex (disambiguation)
