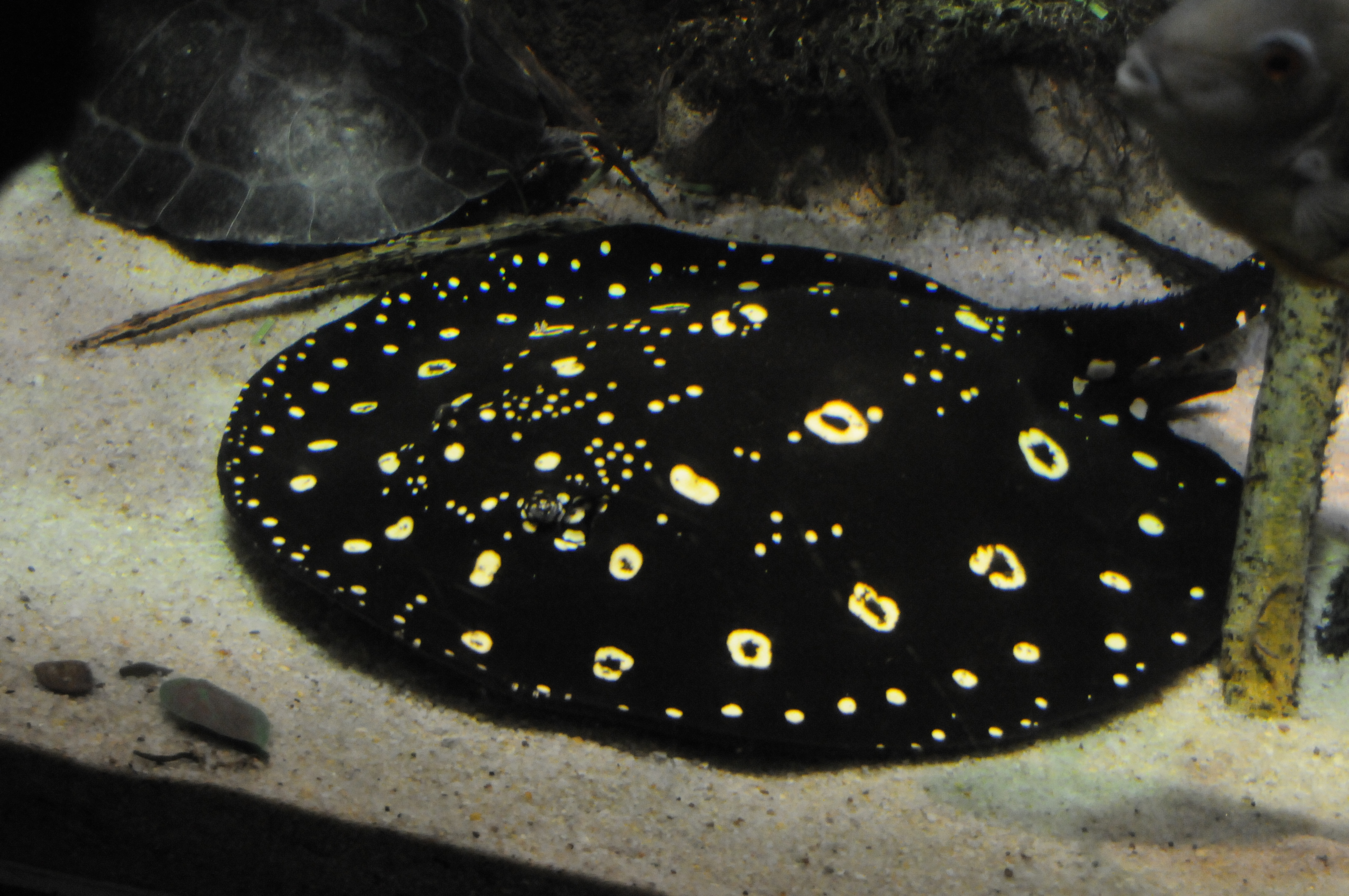

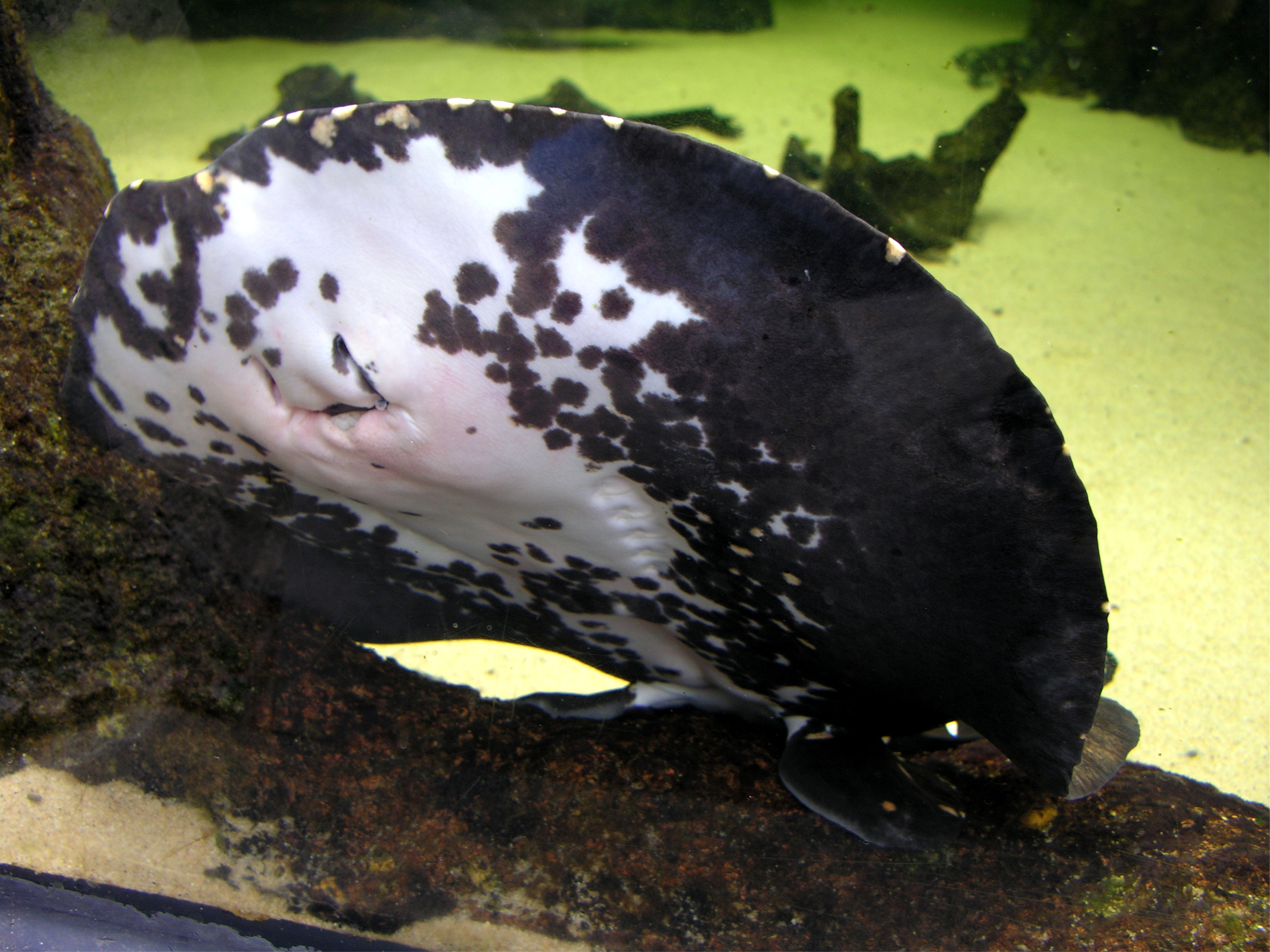
- Showing upperparts (photo above) and underparts with mouth (photo below)

Conservation status
- Vulnerable (IUCN 3.1)
- CITES Appendix II

Scientific classification
- Kingdom: Animalia
- Phylum: Chordata
- Class: Chondrichthyes
- Subclass: Elasmobranchii
- Order: Myliobatiformes
- Family: Potamotrygonidae
- Genus: Potamotrygon
- Species: P. henlei

Binomial name
- Potamotrygon henlei (Castelnau, 1855)

Synonyms
- Trygon henlei Castelnau, 1855

= Bigtooth river stingray =

Species of cartilaginous fish

The bigtooth river stingray or Tocantins River ray (Potamotrygon henlei) is a species of freshwater fish in the family Potamotrygonidae. It is endemic to the lower Tocantins basin and Araguaia basin in Brazil, and prefers muddy bottoms. It is sometimes kept in aquaria. This stingray is generally common and its population increased after the Tucuruí Dam was completed, unlike many other species in its range.

== Appearance and relatives ==
P. henlei reaches up to 71 cm (2.33 ft) in disc width and 104.2 cm (3.42 ft) in total length. It is replaced by the closely related P. rex in the mid and upper Tocantins basin, but that species has concentrically clustered yellow-orange spots. Two other close relatives where the spots are yellowish-white (as in P. henlei) are found in other Brazilian rivers: P. leopoldi from the Xingu River basin and P. albimaculata from the Tapajós River basin. Compared to P. leopoldi, P. henlei is duller above, appearing blackish or dark gray-brown (as opposed to deeper black in P. leopoldi), and its underparts have a large white center and broad brownish-dusky edges (underparts mostly brownish-dusky in P. leopoldi). Compared to P. albimaculata, P. henlei has larger yellowish-white spots above.

In episode 5 of season 3 of River Monsters, “Electric executioner”, British scientist and angler, Jeremy Wade once hauled out a bigtooth river stingray from a boat, the stingray had a black body with yellow isolated spots around the disc. Brown blotched specimens of P. henlei are also recorded.
