= Heliotrygon gomesi =

Conservation status
- Vulnerable (IUCN 3.1)

Scientific classification
- Kingdom: Animalia
- Phylum: Chordata
- Class: Chondrichthyes
- Subclass: Elasmobranchii
- Order: Myliobatiformes
- Family: Potamotrygonidae
- Genus: Heliotrygon
- Species: H. gomesi

Binomial name
- Heliotrygon gomesi M. R. de Carvalho & Lovejoy, 2011

Species of cartilaginous fish

Heliotrygon gomesi, or Gomes's round ray, is a species of freshwater stingray native to the western Amazon basin in South America, specifically Brazil. It is the type species of its genus. It spends the day in deep river channels, but moves closer to the shore at night to feed.

== Taxonomy ==
Heliotrygon gomesi was first discovered in Rio Jamari, Brazil, and described by Marcelo Rodrigues de Carvalho and Nathan R. Lovejoy in 2011. The genus name, Heliotrygon, is derived from the Greek word 'helios', meaning sun, and refers to the ray's circular body that radiates outward. This species is named gomesi in honor of Ulisses L. Gomes and his pioneering research on elasmobranchs.

Gomes' round ray is a member of the family Potamotrygonidae. Potamotrygonids are unique among living ray families in that they have diversified in the South American freshwater environment.

== Description ==
This ray has an extremely circular body and reaches a disc width up to 58 cm (23 in). The eyes of H. gomesi are very small and unprotruding. It is uniform gray to light brown above and it lacks any distinctive patterns. In addition to the lack of pattern, this species differs from H. rosai by showing a slender tail width at its base, a slightly larger preorbital snout length, and a proportionally smaller pelvic inner length. It shows angular cartilages. Both species of Heliotrygon have greatly reduced caudal stings, rendering them virtually harmless.
