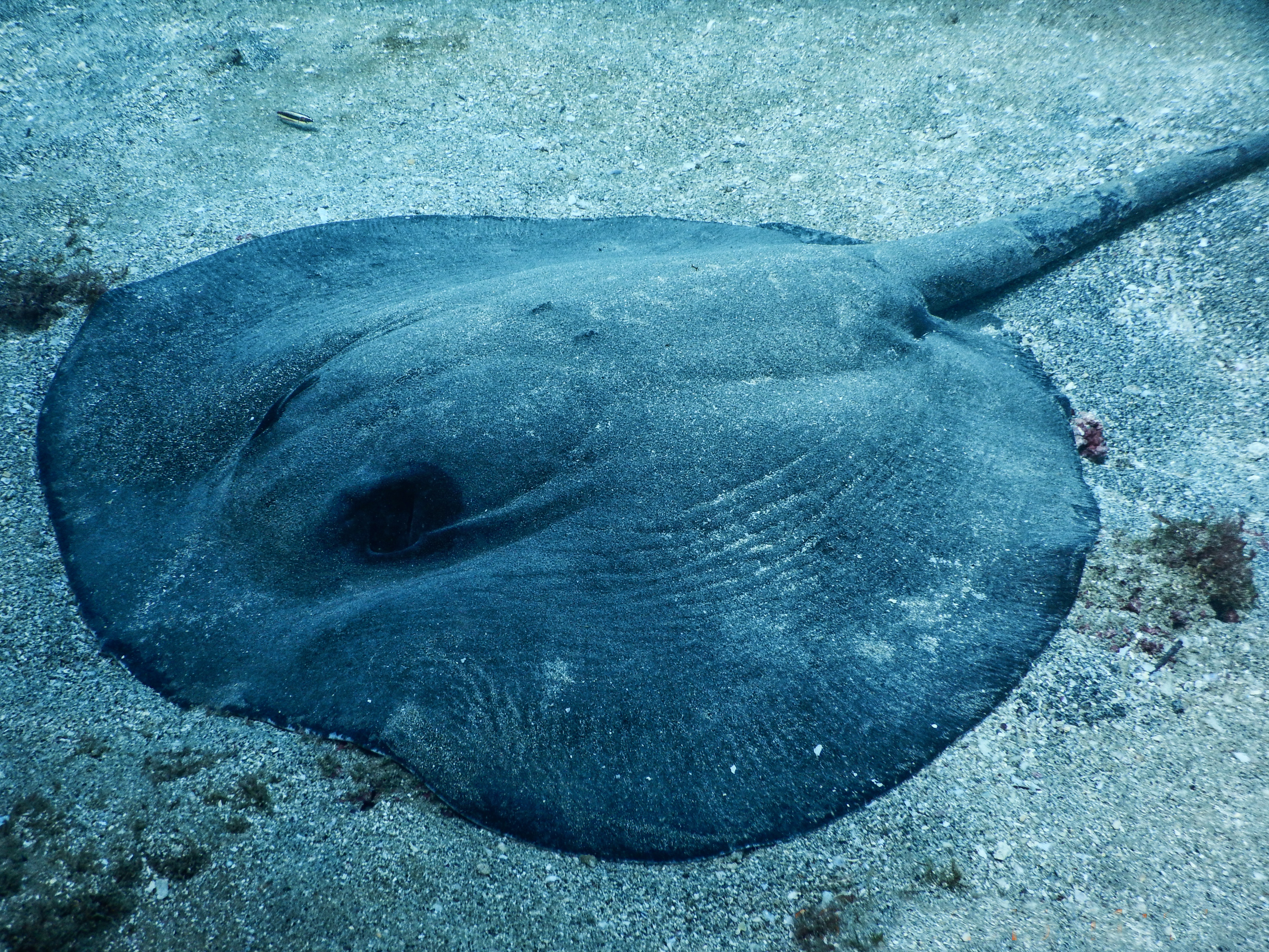

Conservation status
- Vulnerable (IUCN 3.1)

Scientific classification
- Kingdom: Animalia
- Phylum: Chordata
- Class: Chondrichthyes
- Subclass: Elasmobranchii
- Order: Myliobatiformes
- Family: Potamotrygonidae
- Genus: Styracura
- Species: S. pacifica

Binomial name
- Styracura pacifica (Beebe & Tee-Van, 1941)

Synonyms
- Dasyatis pacificus Beebe & Tee-Van, 1941; Himantura pacifica (Beebe & Tee-Van, 1941)

= Pacific chupare =

Species of cartilaginous fish

The Pacific chupare or Pacific whiptail stingray (Styracura pacifica) is a species of stingray in the family Potamotrygonidae. It has been reported off the Pacific coast of Central America from Oaxaca, Mexico to Costa Rica, and also around the Galapagos Islands. It is usually found in shallow water on soft silty or muddy flats; it is unknown whether this species is tolerant of low salinity like the related chupare stingray (S. schmardae). Leonard Compagno doubted the taxonomic validity of this species in his 1999 Checklist of Living Elasmobranchs.

== Appearance ==
This stingray attains a maximum known length of 150 cm (59 in) and a disk width of 60 cm (24 in). It has a rounded pectoral fin disk and a broadly angled snout with a small protuberance at the tip. The tail lacks fin folds but has a low ventral keel. The dorsal surface of the body and tail are covered with rough dermal denticles. There are large tubercles with four radial ridges on the shoulder region. A venomous spine is present on the tail.

== Parasites and behavior ==
Known parasites of this species include the nematode Echinocephalus janzeni and the cestodes Acanthobothroides pacificus and Rhinebothrium geminum. Reproduction is ovoviviparous.

== Taxonomy ==
The Pacific chupare and the chupare stingray in the Atlantic are believed to be sister species, together referred to as the "amphi-American Himantura". The two species are morphologically similar and share four-ridged shoulder tubercles. Based on the details of the mandibular musculature and articulation, the amphi-American Himantura are hypothesized to be most closely related to the river stingrays in the family Potamotrygonidae, rather than to Indo-Pacific Himantura species. This has given rise to the theory that both the amphi-American Himantura and the river stingrays are descended from euryhaline ancestors living along the northern coast of South America prior to the formation of the Isthmus of Panama. This interpretation was initially disputed, as parasitological evidence suggests that the river stingrays are most closely related to Pacific Urobatis stingrays. In 2016, a major review of "Himantura" based on morphology and molecular evidence confirmed the position of the Pacific chupare, and it was moved to the genus Styracura (together with the chupare stingray) in the family Potamotrygonidae.
