= Potamotrygon tatianae =

Tatiana's river stingray

Conservation status
- Vulnerable (IUCN 3.1)

Scientific classification
- Kingdom: Animalia
- Phylum: Chordata
- Class: Chondrichthyes
- Subclass: Elasmobranchii
- Order: Myliobatiformes
- Family: Potamotrygonidae
- Genus: Potamotrygon
- Species: P. tatianae

Binomial name
- Potamotrygon tatianae Silva & Carvalho, 2011

Species of cartilaginous fish

Potamotrygon tatianae, the Tatiana's river stingray, is a species of river stingray (Potamotrygonidae) endemic to the Madre de Dios River and upper Madeira River basins in Peru.

== Description ==
This river stingray's oval disc is longer than wide (disc length between 102 and 131% of the disc width). The total length of the species is up to 75.5 cm (2 ft 5.7 in), the disc length up to 47.5 cm (1 ft 6.7 in) and the disc width up to 36.2 cm (1 ft 2.3 in). The mouth is small, opening relatively straight across, and has two lateral and three central papillae. One of the central papillae is closer to the lower jaw tooth plate. The teeth are relatively small, with 36-46 rows in the upper jaw and 33‑45 in the lower jaw.

The background colour is generally blackish-brown with beige, light beige, or dark brown spots.

This species was named after Tatiana Raso de Moraes Possato, a late student of biology who was an enthusiastic researcher of chondrichthyans, in particular potamotrygonids.

The types are housed in Brazil at the Museum of Zoology of the University of São Paulo: MZUSP 107673; Paratype: MZUSP 107667; MZUSP 107668).
