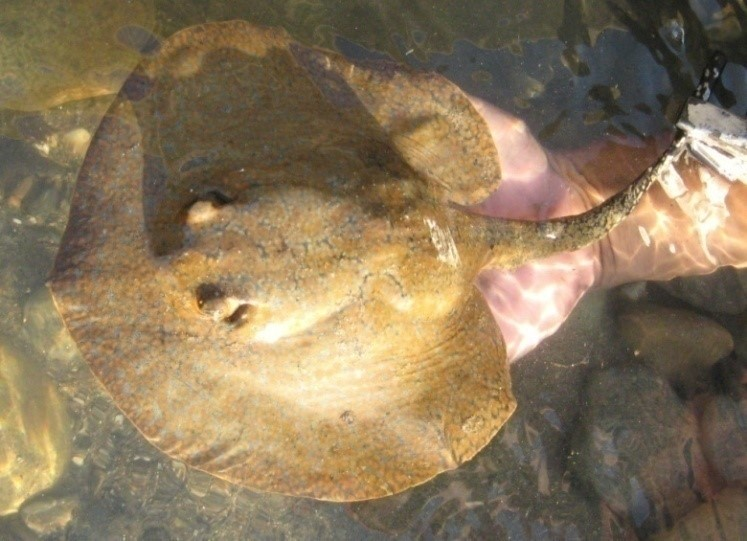

Conservation status
- Near Threatened (IUCN 3.1)

Scientific classification
- Kingdom: Animalia
- Phylum: Chordata
- Class: Chondrichthyes
- Subclass: Elasmobranchii
- Order: Myliobatiformes
- Family: Potamotrygonidae
- Genus: Potamotrygon
- Species: P. magdalenae

Binomial name
- Potamotrygon magdalenae Duméril, 1865

Synonyms
- Taeniura magdalenae Duméril 1865

= Potamotrygon magdalenae =

Species of cartilaginous fish

Potamotrygon magdalenae, the Magdalena River stingray, is a species of freshwater fish in the family Potamotrygonidae. It is found only in the Magdalena and Atrato basins in Colombia, but it is locally abundant and among the predominant fish species in its range. It is a small species of stingray with a typical disc width of about 20 cm (8 in), although it can reach up to 35 cm (14 in).
