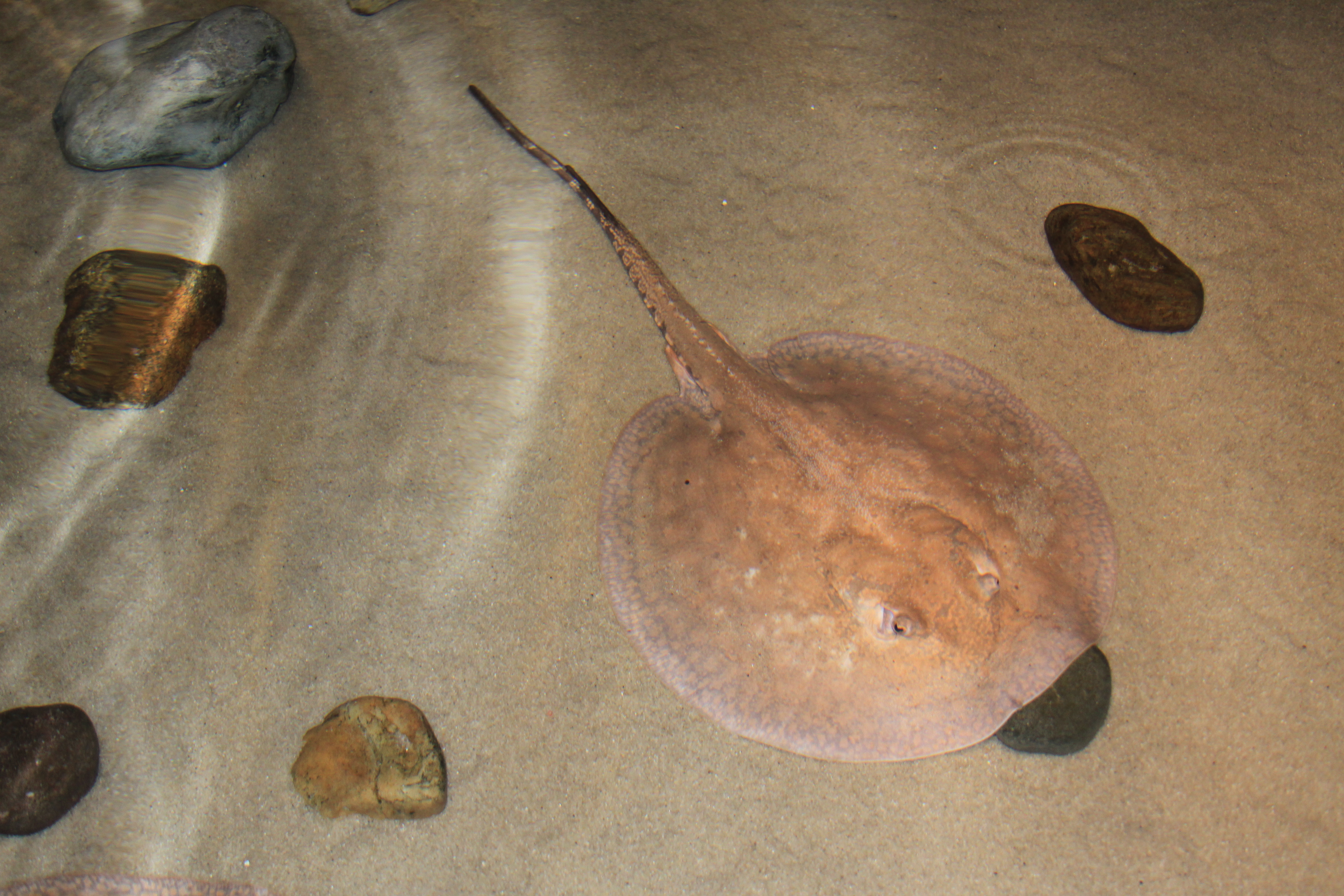

Conservation status
- Near Threatened (IUCN 3.1)

Scientific classification
- Kingdom: Animalia
- Phylum: Chordata
- Class: Chondrichthyes
- Subclass: Elasmobranchii
- Order: Myliobatiformes
- Family: Potamotrygonidae
- Genus: Potamotrygon
- Species: P. histrix

Binomial name
- Potamotrygon histrix (J. P. Müller & Henle, 1834)

Synonyms
- Potamotrygon hystrix; Trygon hystrix

= Porcupine river stingray =

Species of cartilaginous fish

The porcupine river stingray (Potamotrygon histrix, sometimes incorrectly modified to Potamotrygon hystrix) is a species of river stingray in the family Potamotrygonidae, the type of the Potamotrygon genus. It is found in the basins of the Paraná and Paraguay River basins in South America. The population in the Rio Negro basin was described as a separated species, P. wallacei, in 2016.

== Appearance ==
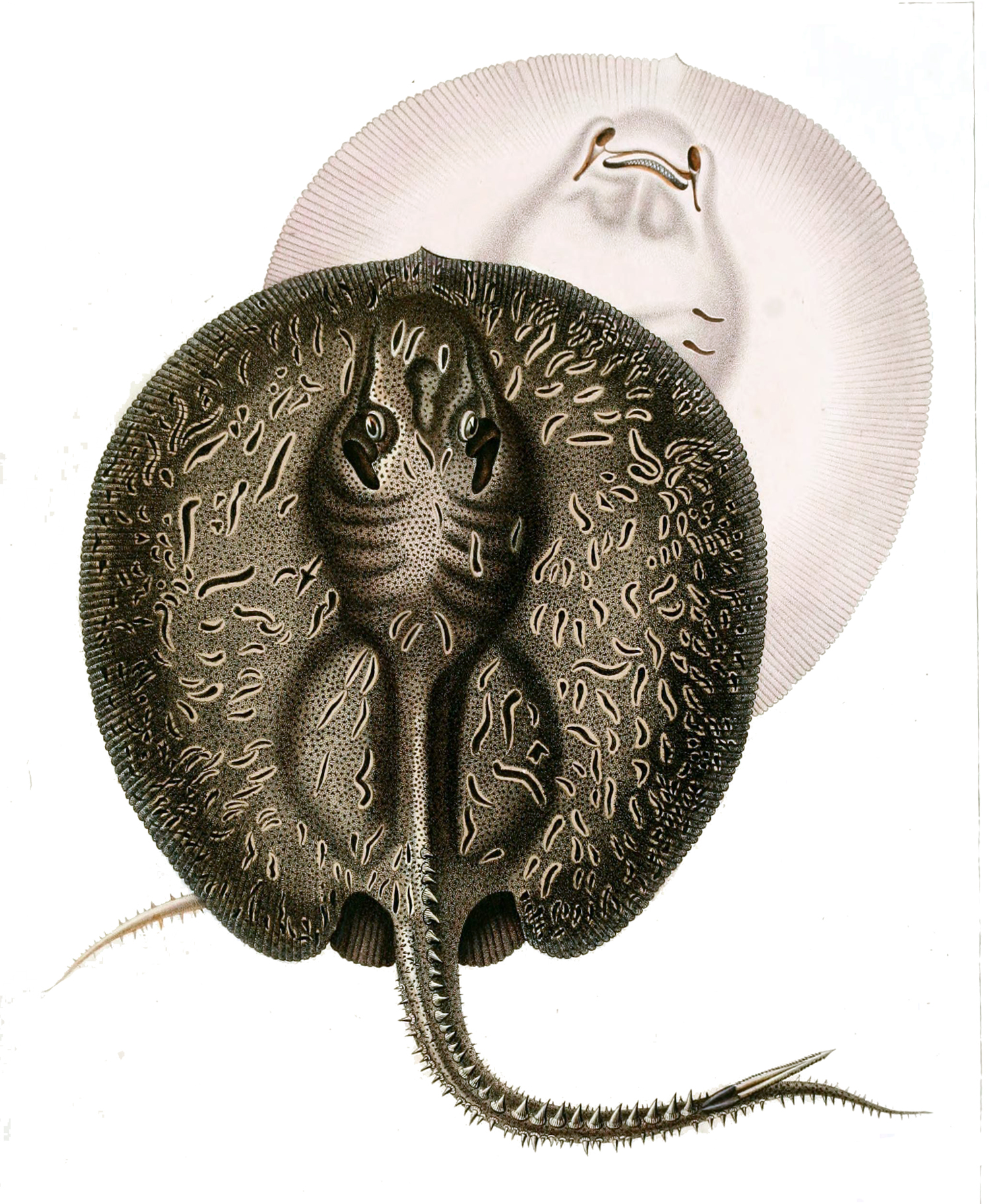
Dorsal and ventral view

Almost circular in shape, it grows up to 40 cm (16 in) in disc width and 15 kg (33 lb) in weight. The upper surface is covered with denticles (sharp tooth-like scales). The coloration is light brownish with mottled patterns on the dorso, and pink on the ventral side. As with all stingrays, the mouth and gill openings are on the underside, and the eyes and gills exits are on the dorsal side.

=== Sting ===
Like other stingrays, the fish of this genus have venomous barbs at the base of their tails, and are dangerous to humans. The sting is replaced at roughly six-month intervals. It is an almost flat, barbed structure that can reach 6 cm (2.4 in) in length, and is covered with a toxic mucus, making any attack a very painful one.

The natives of South America are said to fear the stingray more than the piranha. However, they are not aggressive fish and not dangerous unless stepped on or otherwise threatened.

== Aquarium ==
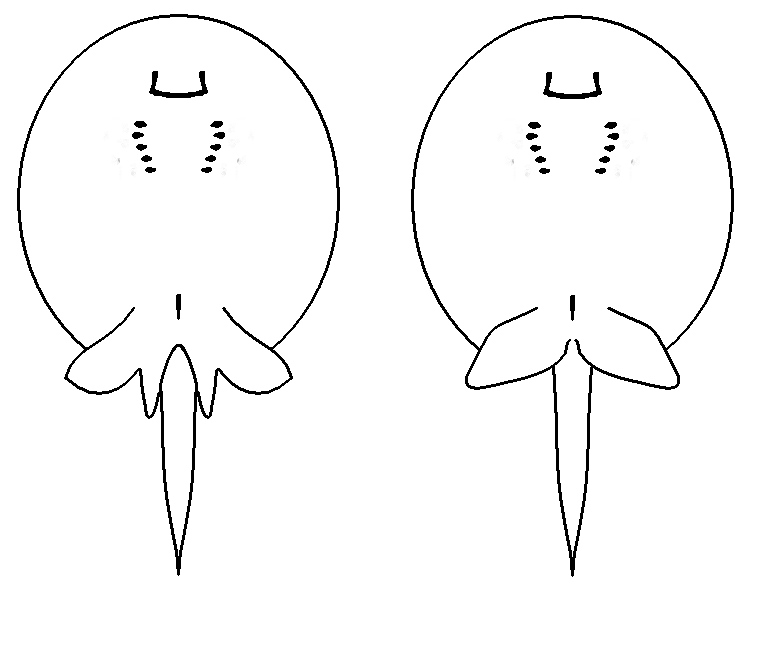
P. histrix, male (left) and female (right). Notice the two claspers on the male

Freshwater stingrays of the genus Potamotrygon are sometimes kept as exotic aquarium fish; though freshwater stingray of other genera do appear in the trade, most are from this genus. They are best kept with a deep, sandy substrate, in which they bury themselves, often with only their eyes visible. They are not territorial with other animals and can be kept in groups, provided a large enough aquarium is provided. They are carnivorous bottom-feeders and require strong filtration as they are rather sensitive to water conditions (any spike in NO_{2} levels can kill them with no warning). Juvenile stingrays are unable to survive in waters that contain salinity over 20.6%. Like many species of stingrays, P. histrix has been bred in captivity, but they require a large tank. The male should be smaller than the female, as it is rather aggressive, biting the female during the mating process. Males can be determined by the presence of claspers as in other chondrichthyans.
