= Freshwater stingray =

Freshwater stingray may refer to species of two families in the order Myliobatiformes:

- Dasyatidae, found in the Amazon, Africa, Asia, and Australia
- Potamotrygonidae, found in South America
