= Potamotrygon schuhmacheri =

Conservation status
- Data Deficient (IUCN 3.1)

Scientific classification
- Kingdom: Animalia
- Phylum: Chordata
- Class: Chondrichthyes
- Subclass: Elasmobranchii
- Order: Myliobatiformes
- Family: Potamotrygonidae
- Genus: Potamotrygon
- Species: P. schuhmacheri

Binomial name
- Potamotrygon schuhmacheri Castex, 1964

Species of fish

Potamotrygon schuhmacheri, the Parana river stingray, is a species of fish in the family Potamotrygonidae. It is found in the Paraná and Paraguay River basins in Argentina, Paraguay, and possibly Brazil. Its natural habitat is rivers. It is threatened by habitat loss.

The fish is named in honor of a student in Castex' former high-school and a collaborator, Roberto Schümacher (1947–1964), who died in an accident.
