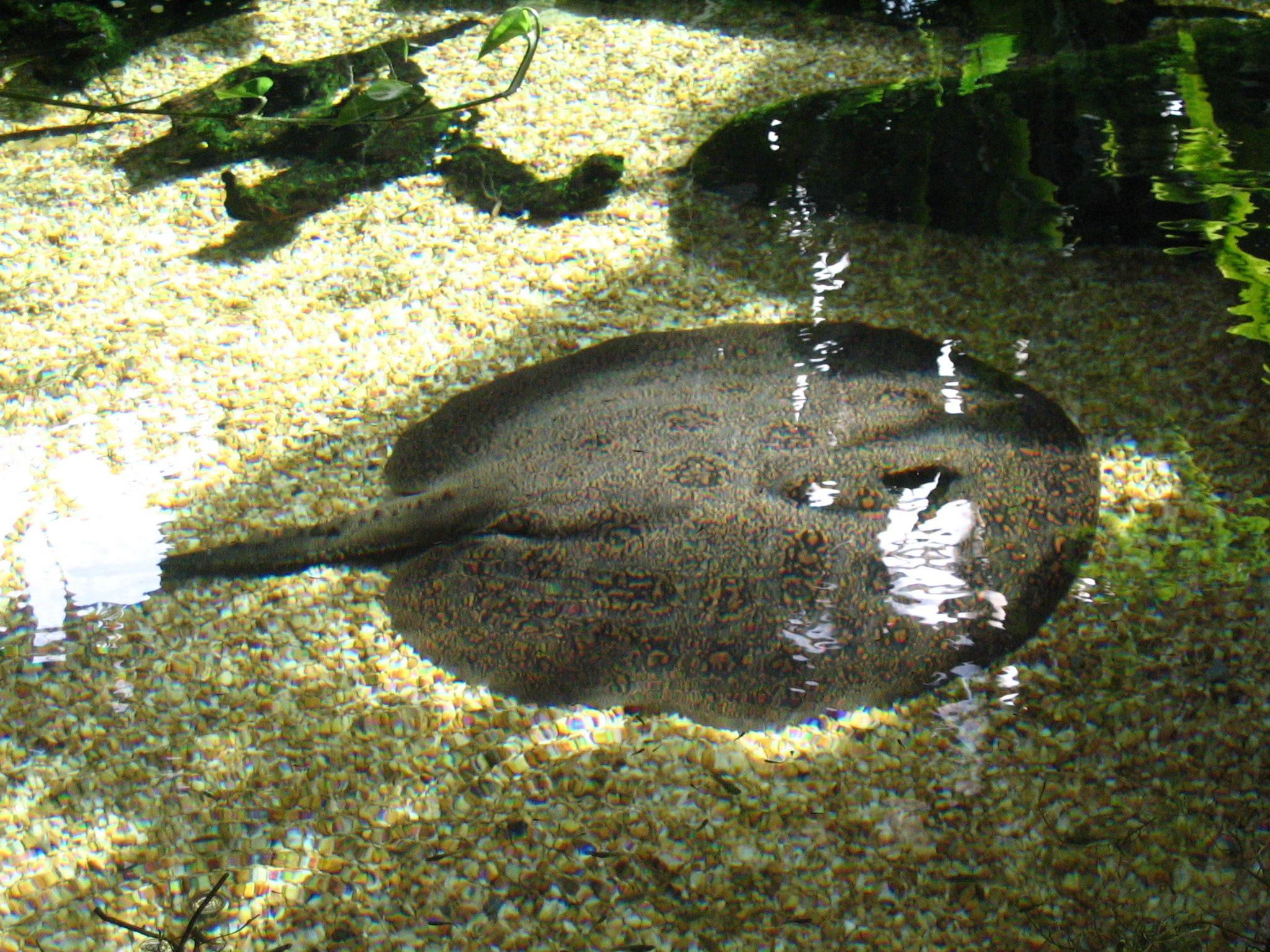
- At the National Zoo in Washington, D.C.

Conservation status
- Least Concern (IUCN 3.1)

Scientific classification
- Kingdom: Animalia
- Phylum: Chordata
- Class: Chondrichthyes
- Subclass: Elasmobranchii
- Order: Myliobatiformes
- Family: Potamotrygonidae
- Genus: Potamotrygon
- Species: P. orbignyi

Binomial name
- Potamotrygon orbignyi (Castelnau, 1855)

Synonyms
- Potamotrygon dumerilii (Castelnau, 1855); Trygon orbignyi Castelnau, 1855; Trygon dumerilii Castelnau, 1855; Trygon reticulatus Günther, 1880

= Potamotrygon orbignyi =

Species of cartilaginous fish

Potamotrygon orbignyi, the smooth back river stingray or reticulate freshwater stingray, is a species of river stingray in the family Potamotrygonidae. It is found in the Amazon and Orinoco River basins in South America.

== Etymology ==
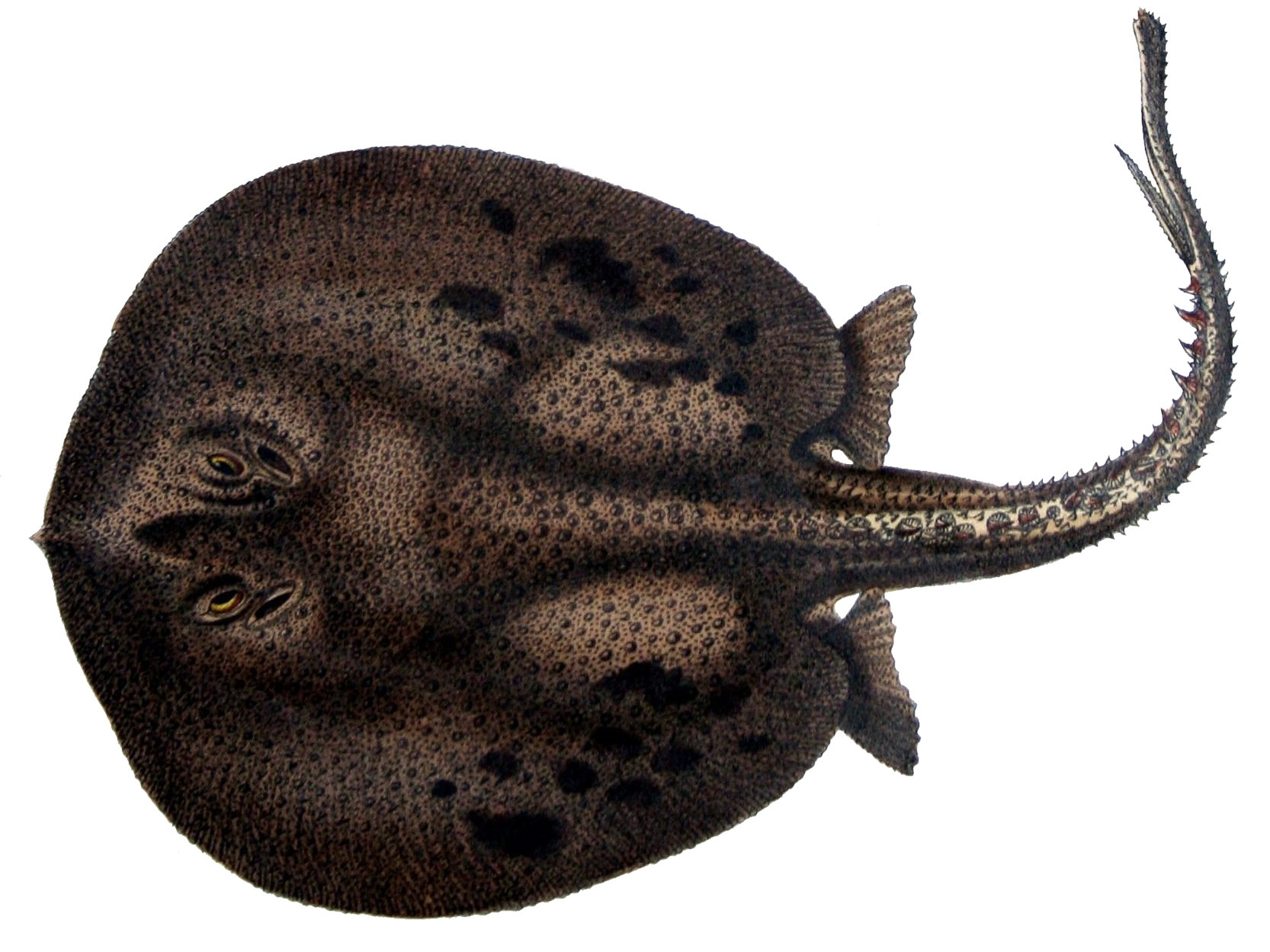
Illustration of Potamotrygon orbignyi by Castelnau.

The genus name Potamotrygon comes from the Greek words potamos (river) and trygon (sting ray). The species name is in honor of Alcide Charles Victor Marie Dessalines d'Orbigny.
