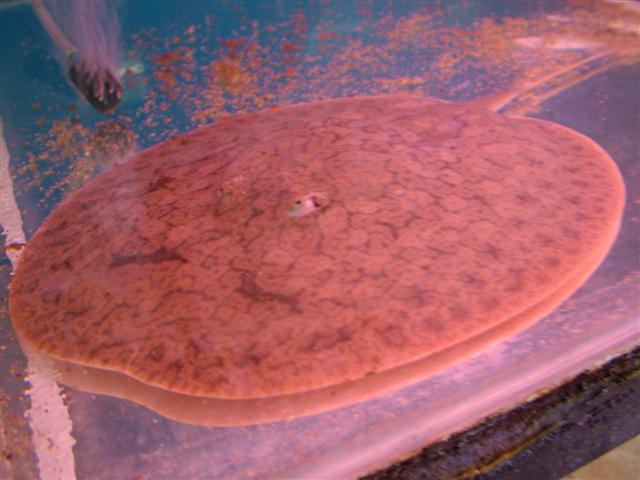

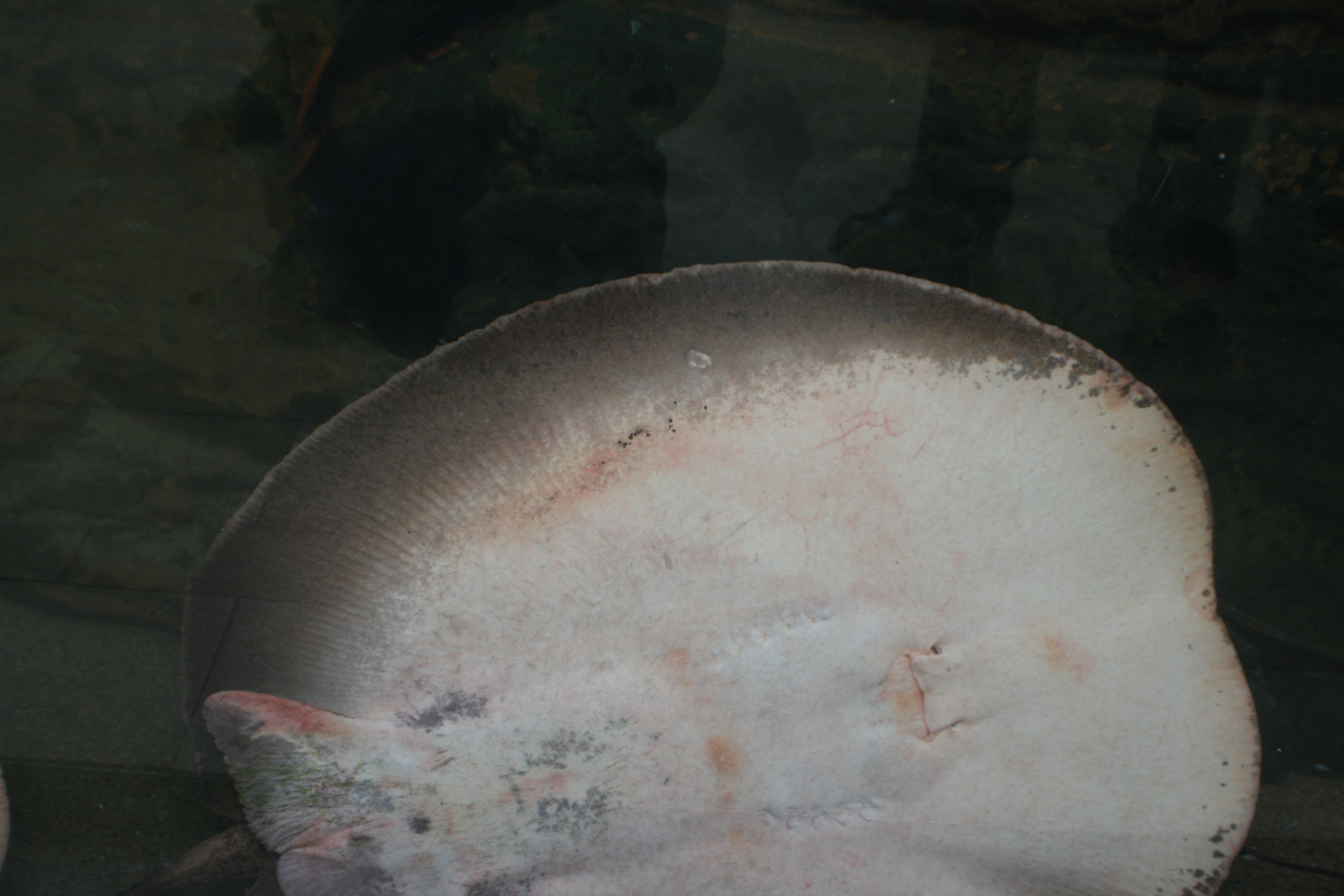
- Paratrygon aiereba from above and below. Notice its concave snout, visible lower left on upper photo and to the right on lower photo

Conservation status
- Critically Endangered (IUCN 3.1)

Scientific classification
- Kingdom: Animalia
- Phylum: Chordata
- Class: Chondrichthyes
- Subclass: Elasmobranchii
- Order: Myliobatiformes
- Family: Potamotrygonidae
- Genus: Paratrygon
- Species: P. aiereba

Binomial name
- Paratrygon aiereba (J. P. Müller & Henle, 1841)

= Paratrygon aiereba =

Species of cartilaginous fish

Paratrygon aiereba also known as discus ray, manzana ray or ceja ray is a river stingray from the Amazon basin in South America.

== Appearance ==
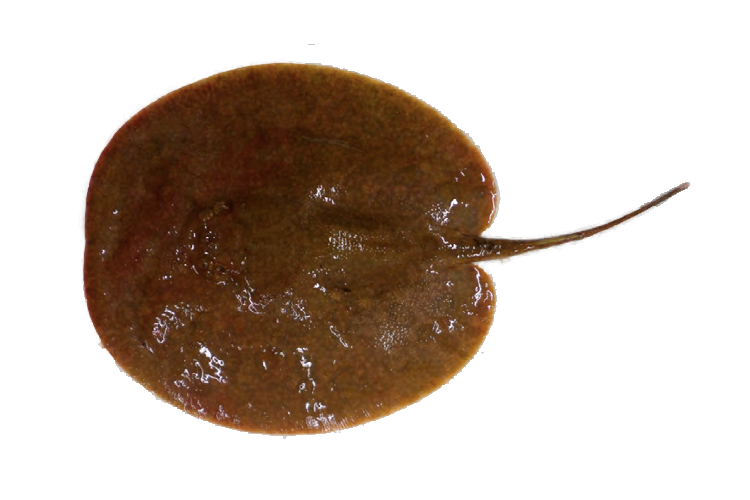
Paratygon aiereba collected from Tocantins, Brazil

This freshwater ray has small eyes and a disc shaped roughly like a lily pad (the snout is slightly concave). It is brownish above with a dark vermiculated or reticulated pattern.

It reaches up to 1.6 m (5.2 ft) in disc width and 110 kg (240 lb) in weight, making it one of the largest species in the family. There are unconfirmed claims of much larger individuals, but these are considered highly questionable. Most individuals do not surpass a disc width of 1.3 m (4.3 ft). Males reach maturity at a disc width of about 60 cm (2.0 ft) and females at about 72 cm (2.4 ft).

== Behavior ==
It mainly feeds on fish, but also take invertebrates such as insects and crustaceans, and it is a top predator in its habitat. Adults are found in relatively deep waters in main river channels, but move to shallower waters to feed at night. After a nine-month gestation, the female give birth to an average of two young with a disc width of about 16 cm (6.3 in). Juveniles are found in relatively shallow waters at sandy beaches and in creeks.
