= Heliotrygon =

Scientific classification
- Kingdom: Animalia
- Phylum: Chordata
- Class: Chondrichthyes
- Subclass: Elasmobranchii
- Order: Myliobatiformes
- Family: Potamotrygonidae
- Subfamily: Potamotrygoninae
- Genus: Heliotrygon; M. R. de Carvalho & Lovejoy, 2011

Genus of cartilaginous fishes

Heliotrygon is a genus of freshwater stingrays in the family Potamotrygonidae. The genus is endemic to the Amazon basin in South America. Despite being discovered decades earlier, the genus was only scientifically described in 2011. They mainly live in deep river channels, but approach the shore at night to feed on fish.

Their discs are very circular in shape (including the snout), and they have tiny eyes and a relatively short tail with an essentially harmless, vestigial stinger (sometimes even lacking). The largest confirmed disc width is 80 cm (2.6 ft), but there are reports of individuals where it was 1 m (3.3 ft). Both species are greyish or brownish above, but while H. gomesi is overall plain without distinct markings, H. rosai has a white to creamy-white vermiculated pattern.

== Species ==
- Heliotrygon gomesi M. R. de Carvalho & Lovejoy, 2011 (Gomes's round ray)
- Heliotrygon rosai M. R. de Carvalho & Lovejoy, 2011 (Rosa's round ray)
