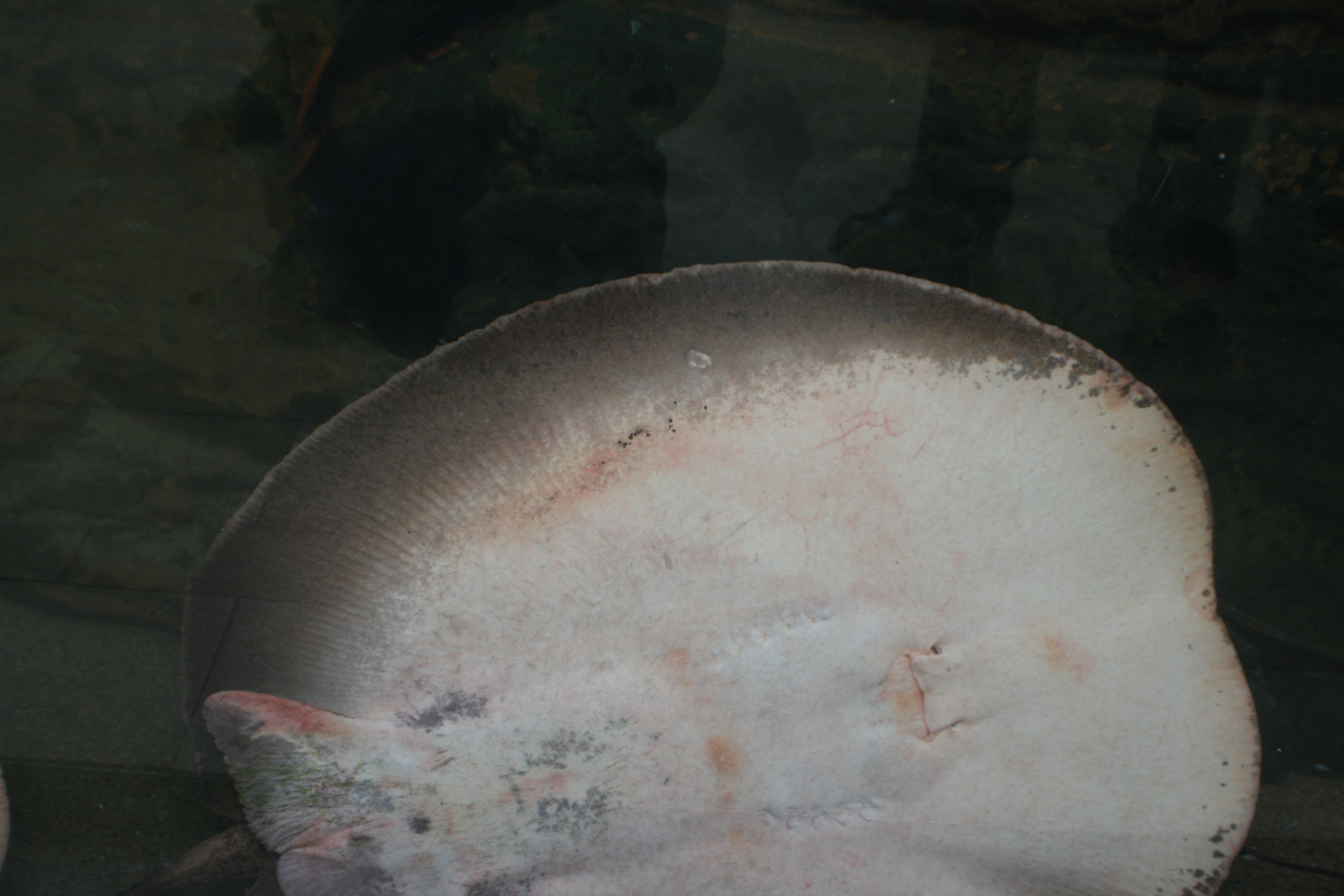
- Paratrygon aiereba

Scientific classification
- Kingdom: Animalia
- Phylum: Chordata
- Class: Chondrichthyes
- Subclass: Elasmobranchii
- Order: Myliobatiformes
- Family: Potamotrygonidae
- Subfamily: Potamotrygoninae
- Genus: Paratrygon; A. H. A. Duméril, 1865

Type species
- Trygon aiereba J. P. Müller & Henle, 1841

= Paratrygon =

Genus of cartilaginous fishes

Paratrygon is a genus of cartilaginous fish in the family Potamotrygonidae.

== Species ==
There are currently seven recognized species:

- Paratrygon aiereba J. P. Müller & Henle, 1841 (Discus ray)
- Paratrygon araguaia Loboda, 2026 (Araguaia discus ray)
- Paratrygon lucindai Loboda, 2026 (Tocantins discus ray)
- Paratrygon munduruku Loboda, 2026 (Tapajós discus ray)
- Paratrygon orinocensis Loboda, Lasso, Rosa & De Carvalho, 2021 (Orinoco discus ray)
- Paratrygon parvaspina Loboda, Lasso, Rosa & De Carvalho, 2021 (Small-spine discus ray)
- Paratrygon raonii Loboda, 2026 (Xingu discus ray)
