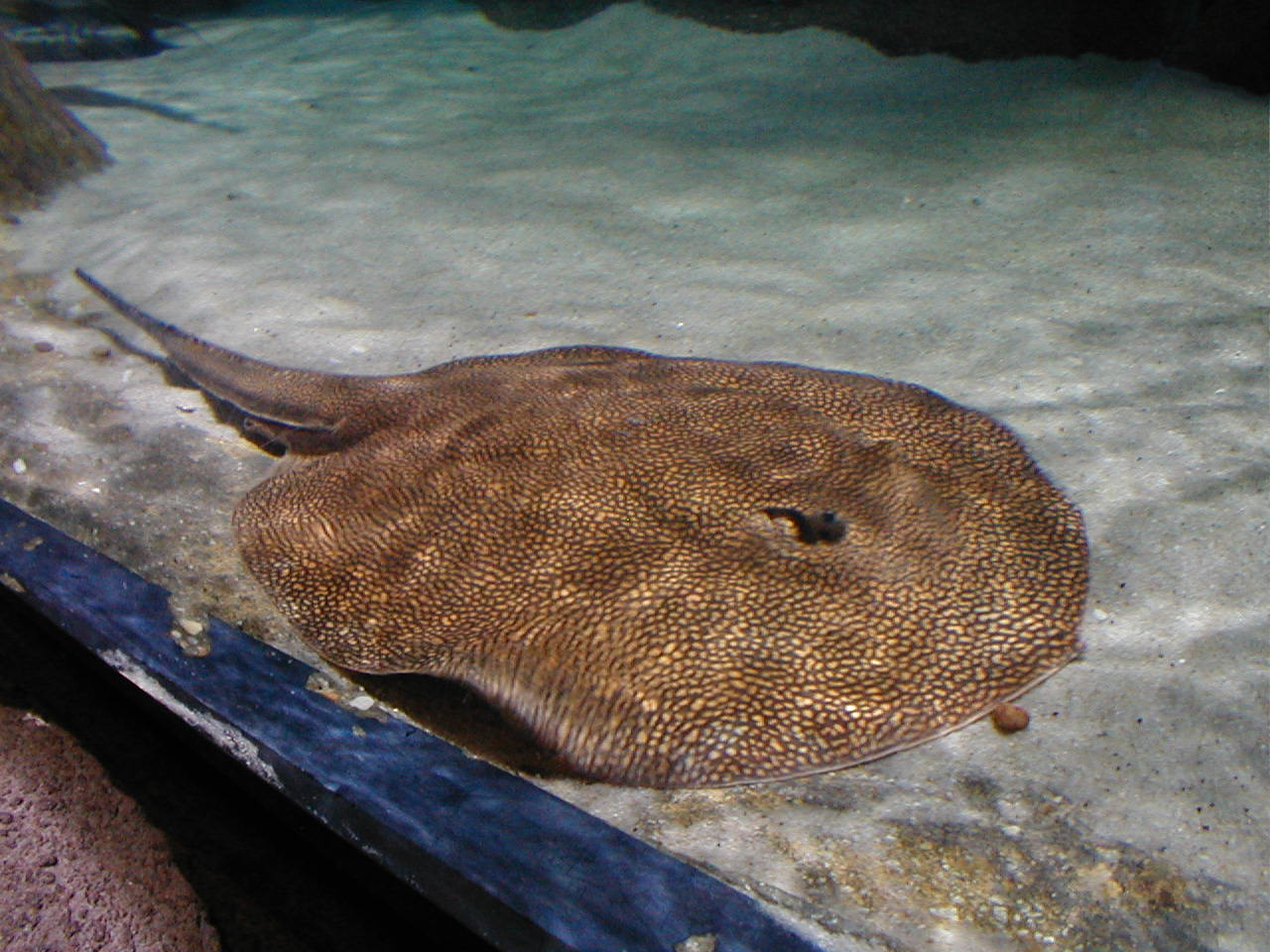

Conservation status
- Least Concern (IUCN 3.1)

Scientific classification
- Kingdom: Animalia
- Phylum: Chordata
- Class: Chondrichthyes
- Subclass: Elasmobranchii
- Order: Myliobatiformes
- Family: Potamotrygonidae
- Genus: Potamotrygon
- Species: P. falkneri

Binomial name
- Potamotrygon falkneri Castex & Maciel, 1963

Synonyms
- Potamotrygon castexi Castello & Yagolkowski, 1969; Potamotrygon menchacai Achenbach, 1967

= Potamotrygon falkneri =

Species of cartilaginous fish

Potamotrygon falkneri, the Paraná freshwater stingray, largespot river stingray, or reticulated freshwater stingray, is a species of freshwater stingray in the family Potamotrygonidae from tropical and subtropical South America. It is sometimes seen in the aquarium trade, but requires a very large tank.

== Taxonomy and appearance ==
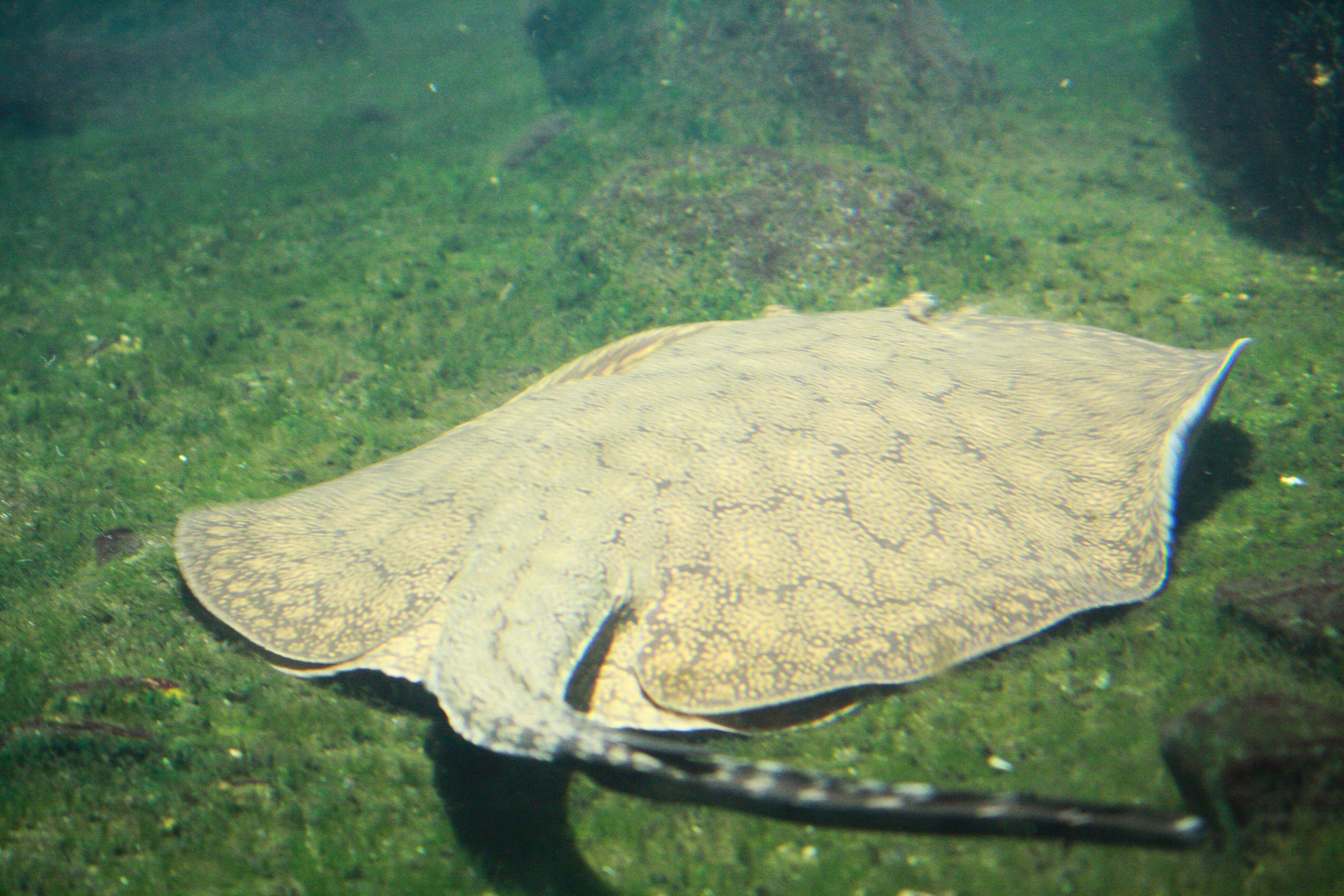
P. falkneri with large, rosette-like spots

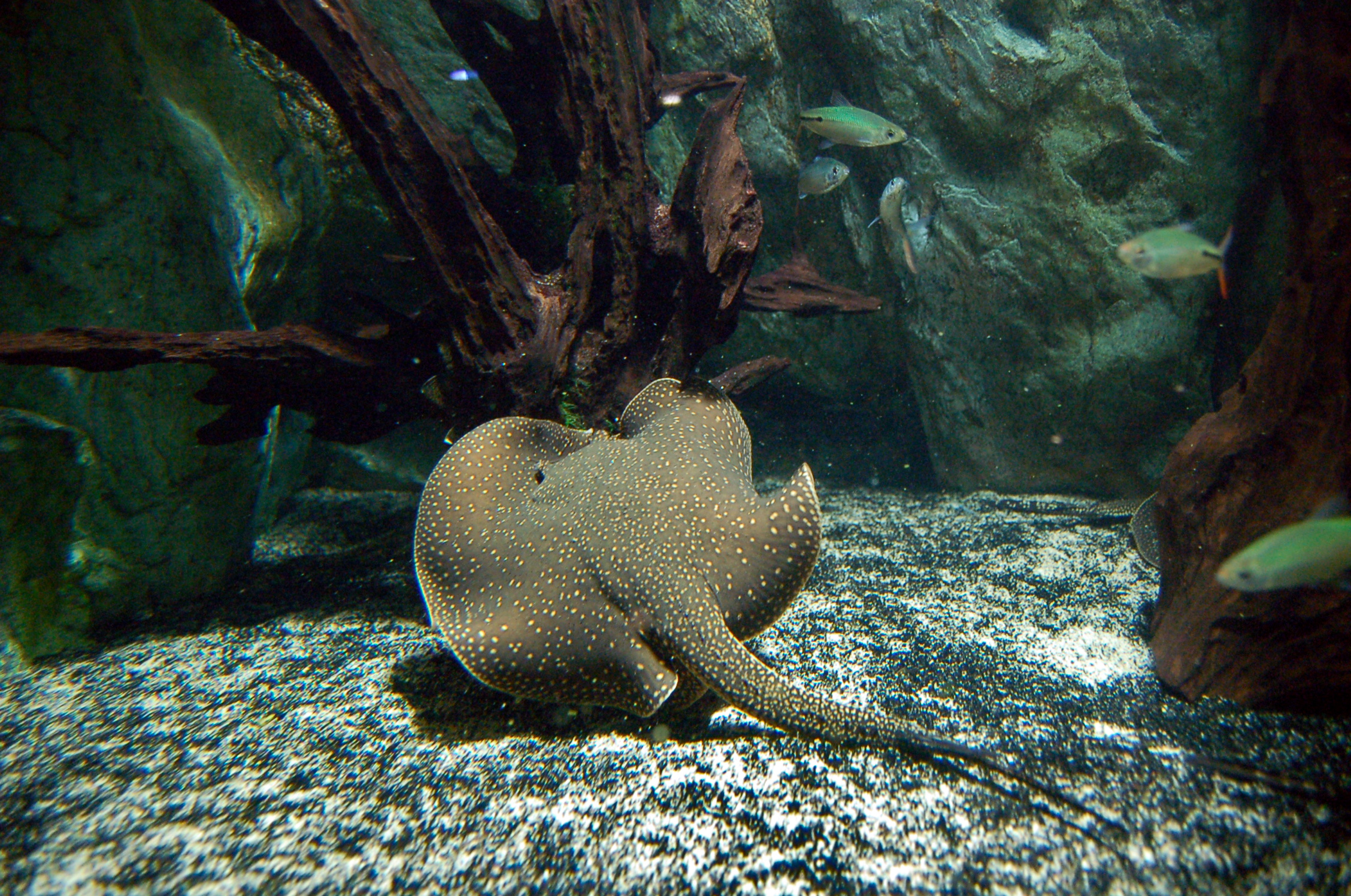
Individual with small, relatively widely separated spots

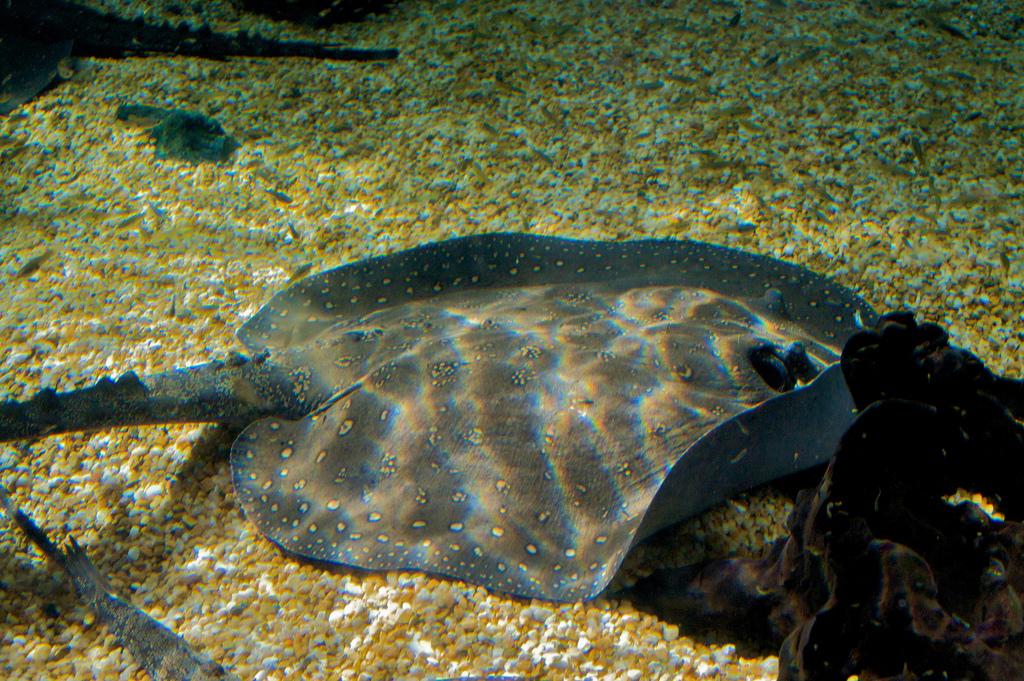
Dark greyish individual with small spots, some arranged in clusters

This species was originally described by ichthyologists Castex and Maciel in 1963.

This species is densely spotted above, but the exact color and pattern are very variable. One of these types was initially described as a separate species P. castexi and another as P. menchacai. Intermediates between the various patterns are common, and all represent variants of the species P. falkneri. It reaches a disc width of up to 52 cm (20 in) and a total length, including tail, up to 89 cm (35 in).

The so-called "tiger stingray" has sometimes been misidentified as P. menchacai (a synonym of P. falkneri), but it is a separate species that only was scientifically described as P. tigrina in 2011.

== Etymology ==
The etymology of the term Potamotrygon derives from the Greek words potamos, which means 'river', and trygon which means 'sting ray'.

The species name is in honor of British Jesuit Tomas Falkner (1707-1784), (also spelled Thomas Falconer), for his apostolic and scientific work in Argentina in the 18th-century.

== Distribution ==
This species has a disjunct distribution with the best-known population found throughout much of the Paraná—Paraguay River basin in southern Brazil, Paraguay, Uruguay and northeastern Argentina. Initially it did not occur in the upper Paraná basin above the Guaíra Falls, but these disappeared after the construction of the Itaipu Dam, allowing this species (and several others) to spread.

The other main distribution of P. falkneri is in the upper Amazon Basin: Madre de Díos, Guaporé, Beni, Marañón and Solimões Rivers in Bolivia, eastern Peru and western Brazil.
