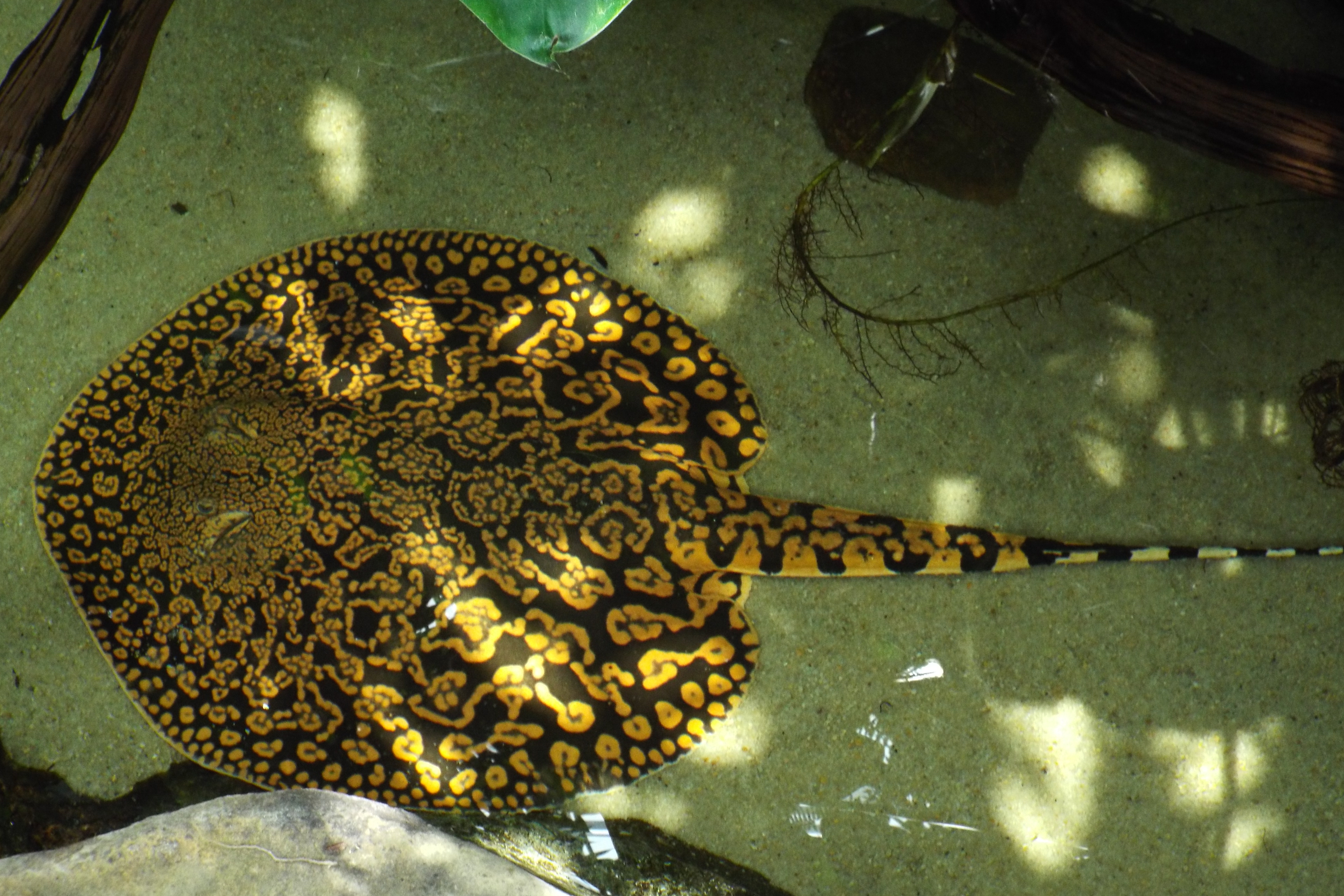

Conservation status
- Endangered (IUCN 3.1)

Scientific classification
- Kingdom: Animalia
- Phylum: Chordata
- Class: Chondrichthyes
- Subclass: Elasmobranchii
- Order: Myliobatiformes
- Family: Potamotrygonidae
- Genus: Potamotrygon
- Species: P. tigrina

Binomial name
- Potamotrygon tigrina M. R. de Carvalho, Sabaj Pérez & Lovejoy, 2011

= Potamotrygon tigrina =

Tiger river stingray

Species of cartilaginous fish

Potamotrygon tigrina, also known as the tiger river stingray, is a species of freshwater ray in the family Potamotrygonidae. This endangered species is endemic to black- and whitewater rivers in the upper Amazon basin in northeastern Peru. It is sometimes kept in aquariums and has been bred in captivity, but it is generally a sensitive species.

The tiger river stingray is closely related to P. schroederi of the Rio Negro–Orinoco. Prior to the scientific description of the tiger river stingray, some used the name P. menchacai, but this is incorrect. P. menchacai is a synonym for the largespot river stingray (P. falkneri).

The maximum size of the tiger river stingray is not known, but it reaches a disc width of at least 70 cm (28 in) and in captivity maturity is reached at a disc width of 48 cm (19 in).
