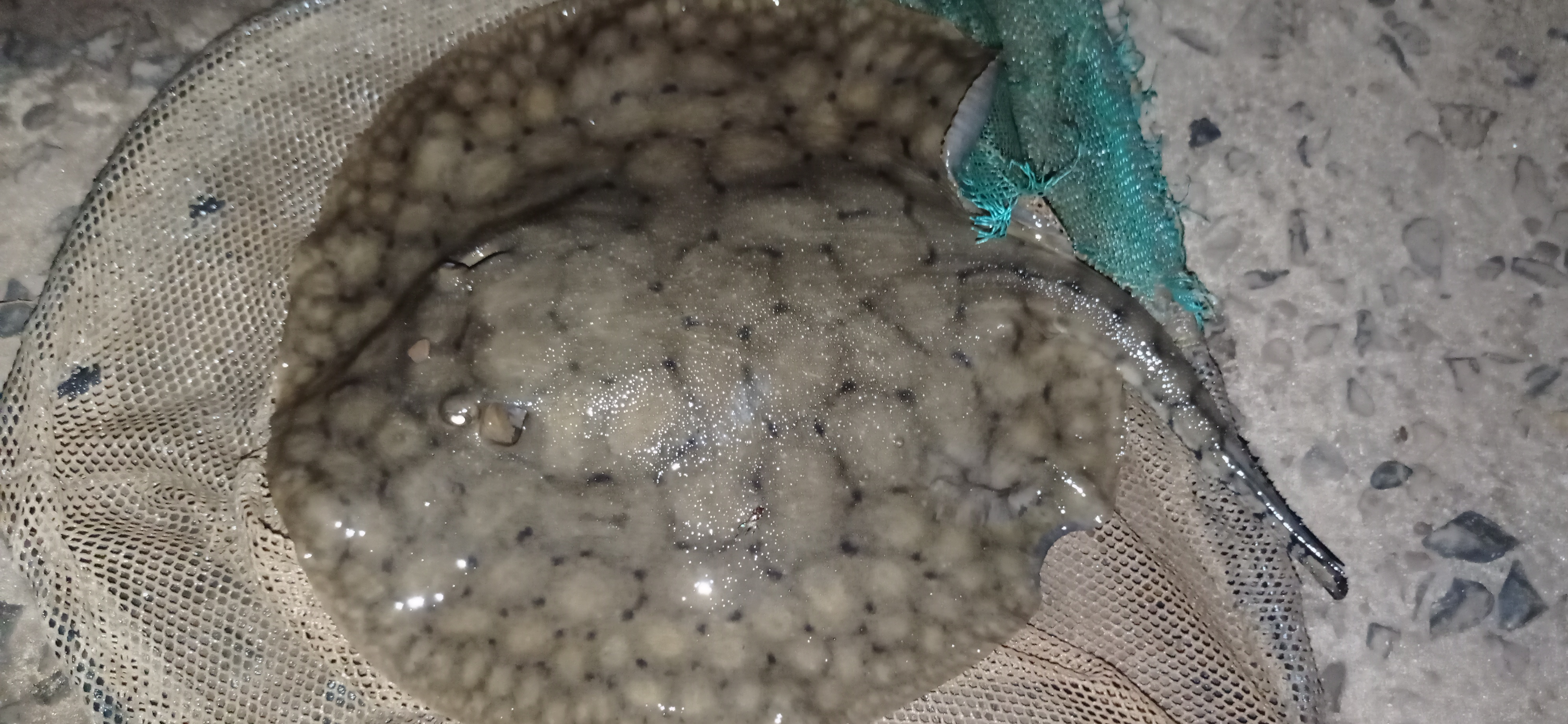
- Juvenile

Conservation status
- Vulnerable (IUCN 3.1)

Scientific classification
- Kingdom: Animalia
- Phylum: Chordata
- Class: Chondrichthyes
- Subclass: Elasmobranchii
- Order: Myliobatiformes
- Family: Potamotrygonidae
- Genus: Potamotrygon
- Species: P. brachyura

Binomial name
- Potamotrygon brachyura (Günther, 1880)

= Short-tailed river stingray =

Species of cartilaginous fish

The short-tailed river stingray (Potamotrygon brachyura) is a species of river stingray (family Potamotrygonidae) native to the Río de la Plata Basin in South America. It is sometimes known as the giant freshwater stingray, but this name is typically used for Urogymnus polylepis.

Growing to a disc diameter of about 1.9 m (6.2 ft) and a weight of 220 kg (485 lb 0 oz), with unconfirmed records of even larger specimens, the short-tailed river stingray is the largest freshwater species in its family and one of the heaviest strict freshwater fish in South America, only matched by the arapaima (Arapaima) and piraíba catfish (Brachyplatystoma filamentosum). The primary threat to the short-tailed river stingray is fishing for food and as a game fish (if not released), but it is also under pressure from habitat loss and occasionally caught for aquaria.

== Description ==
The short-tailed river stingray is circular in shape and humped in the back. The species can reach about 1.9 m (6 ft 3 in) in disc diameter and 220 kilograms (490 lb) in weight, making it the largest freshwater species in the family Potamotrygonidae. They have a dark pattern on their backs, probably used as camouflage. The ray's tail is very muscular and thick, covered with short spines at the base and a venomous sting at the end.

== Distribution ==
The short-tailed river stingray is found in the Río de la Plata Basin, including the Paraguay, Paraná and Uruguay Rivers in the countries of Argentina, Brazil, Paraguay and Uruguay. It may also range into Bolivia in the Pilcomayo River (a tributary of the Paraguay River), but this remains unconfirmed. In the north it ranges from the upper Paraguay River basin, including the Pantanal, and south to the lowermost freshwater sections of the Río de la Plata. Unlike some other freshwater rays, it has not been able to spread to the upper Paraná River basin after the Itaipu Dam flooded the Guaíra Falls, which represented a natural barrier to its range.

== Lifestyle ==
Female short-tailed river stingrays give birth to up to 19 fully formed young stingrays per litter. The pups start off eating plankton and then move on to consume small mollusks, crustaceans, the larvae of aquatic insects, and fish.
