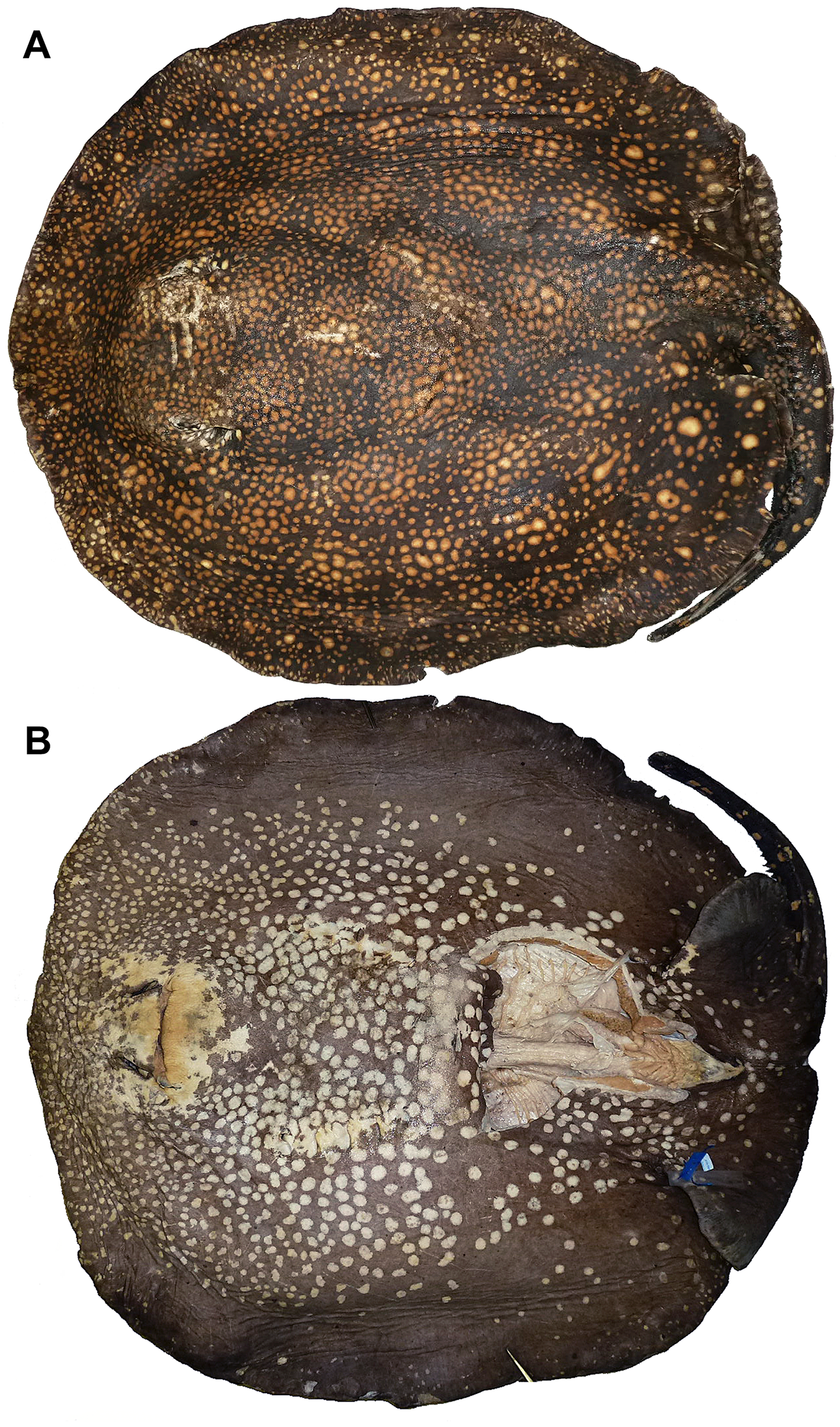
- Adult Potamotrygon rex (photo by Marcelo R. De Carvalho)

Conservation status
- Near Threatened (IUCN 3.1)

Scientific classification
- Kingdom: Animalia
- Phylum: Chordata
- Class: Chondrichthyes
- Subclass: Elasmobranchii
- Order: Myliobatiformes
- Family: Potamotrygonidae
- Genus: Potamotrygon
- Species: P. rex

Binomial name
- Potamotrygon rex M. R. de Carvalho, 2016

= Potamotrygon rex =

Species of freshwater stingray

Potamotrygon rex, the great river stingray, is a species of freshwater stingray belonging to the family Potamotrygonidae, native to South America in the Neotropical region. P. rex, along with some other Potamotrygon species form a sub-species group known as "black stingrays" known by their similar features and their locality to rivers draining the Central Brazilian Shield. Specifically, it is native to the Rio Tocantins in the central Brazilian state of Tocantins. It is quite a large organism, weighing up to 20 kg (44 lb). Its appearance is dark brown to blackish with distinct clusters of yellow-orange spots around similarly colored ocelli on its dorsal side. Distinguishing features include broad pelvic-fin apices, lack of labial grooves, irregular double row of dorsal tail thorns, and having two angular cartilages associated with each hyomandibula.

== Distribution ==
Native to the Neotropical regions of the mid and upper Rio Tocantins in the central Brazilian state of Tocantins. So far, it has not been found outside of these regions.

== Habitat and ecology ==
Potamotrygon rex is a neotropical freshwater stingray in the family Potamotrygonidae from the middle and upper Rio Tocantins, Brazil. It is benthopelagic, meaning that it lives at the bottom of the river. Potamotrygon rex, P. henlei, P. leopoldi and another new Potamotrygon species from the Rio Tapajós form a species-group (the "black stingrays") occurring in rivers draining the central Brazilian shield, characterized by their black to dark brown but highly ornate dorsal color, wide pelvic fins with broadly convex apices, among other features. Potamotrygon rex is the 25th species of Potamotrygon, and highlights that very large new species of fishes that still await discovery and description in the Neotropical region.

== Morphology ==
The genus Potamotrygon consists of freshwater stingrays that can be found in the rivers of South America. Potamotrygon rex is a large stingray species with a circular, almost oval-shaped disc. The top of the disc is very dark brown with yellow-orange spots in round clusters across the entirety of the disc. However, the density of these spots can vary from individual to individual and some exhibit one or two larger spots at the center of the clusters. The bottom of the disc can be dark grey to dark brown with yellowish-white spots. The density of these spots can also vary heavily based on the individual. The largest adult female was found to be 111 cm (3.64 ft) from anterior edge of the disc to the end of the tail, 75 cm (2.46 ft) from the anterior edge to the posterior edge of the disc, and 69 cm (2.26 ft) wide. Adult males are much smaller at around 82.5 cm (2.71 ft) from anterior edge of the disc to the end of the tail, 52.6 cm (1.73 ft) from the anterior edge to the posterior edge of the disc, and 47.5 cm (1.56 ft) wide. Individuals larger than 100 cm (39 in) can weigh up to 20 kg (44 lb). Like the rest of the species in the genus, Potamotrygon rex has venomous barbs at the end of its tail. Beginning at the base of the tail there are two rows of irregularly placed, semi-erect, sharp thorns that go down the length of the tail ending at the venomous barb. The stingray has a venom that causes painful inflammation at the site of the sting. The venom has been found to be more concentrated in females and more effective as the stingray ages.

== Conservation ==
Due to lack of knowledge and research on the species, there is limited information regarding the widespread distribution and population of Potamotrygon rex. Because of this, there are no current conservation efforts regarding the specific species of Potamotrygon rex. However, all species of freshwater stingray belonging to the genus Potamotrygon are listed in CITES Appendix III, which combats the illegal international trade of such animals. The widespread protection of all Potamotrygon species is a basic step in the conservation of freshwater stingrays. Currently, other species of the Potamotrygon genus, Potamotrygon motoro and Potamotrygon falkneri, have been genetically analyzed to suggest the hybridization of such species in conservation efforts. Considering the close morphological, geographic, and genetic similarities regarding Potamotrygon genus, similar studies may be applied to Potamotrygon rex.
