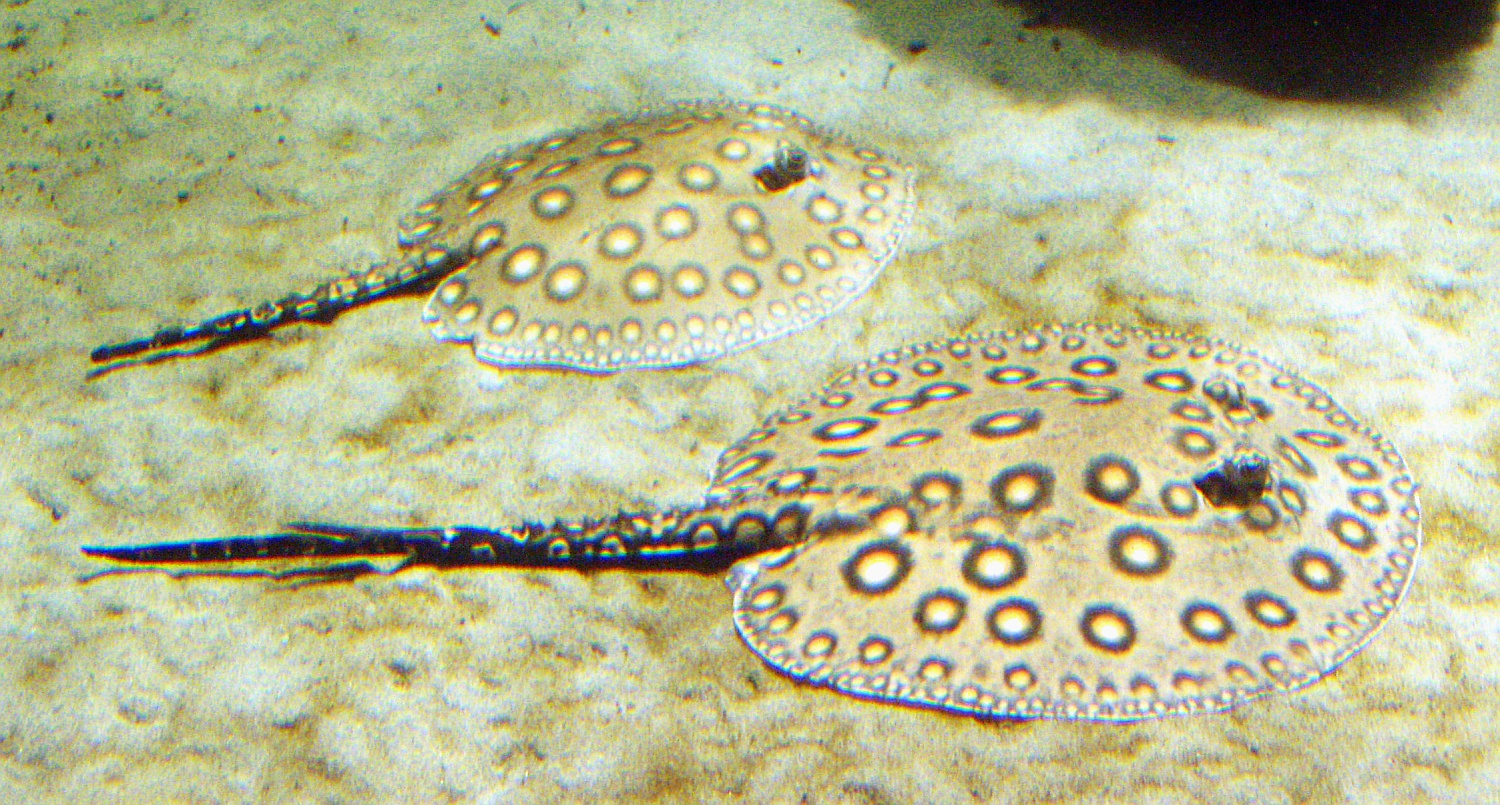
- Ocellate river stingray, Potamotrygon motoro

Scientific classification
- Kingdom: Animalia
- Phylum: Chordata
- Class: Chondrichthyes
- Subclass: Elasmobranchii
- Division: Batomorphi
- Order: Myliobatiformes
- Family: Potamotrygonidae; Garman, 1877

Type species
- Potamotrygon histrix J. P. Müller & Henle, 1841

Genera
- Heliotrygon; Paratrygon; Plesiotrygon; Potamotrygon; Styracura

= Potamotrygonidae =

River stingrays Temporal range: Late Paleocene–present

Family of cartilaginous fishes

River stingrays or freshwater stingrays are Neotropical freshwater fishes of the family Potamotrygonidae in the order Myliobatiformes, one of the four orders of batoids, cartilaginous fishes related to sharks. They are found in rivers in tropical and subtropical South America (freshwater stingrays in Africa, Asia and Australia are in another family, Dasyatidae). A single marine genus, Styracura, of the tropical West Atlantic and East Pacific are also part of Potamotrygonidae. They are generally brownish, greyish or black, often with a mottled, speckled or spotted pattern, have disc widths ranging from 31 to 200 centimetres (1.0–6.6 ft) and venomous tail stingers. River stingrays feed on a wide range of smaller animals and the females give birth to live young. There are more than 35 species in five genera.

== Evolution ==
Potentially the oldest known member of the family is the extinct potential styracurine Atlantitrygon, known from fossil teeth recovered from the Late Paleocene of Senegal. The oldest definitive member of this family, and also the oldest from freshwater habitats, is Potamotrygon ucayalensis from the middle Eocene of Peru.

== Distribution and habitat ==
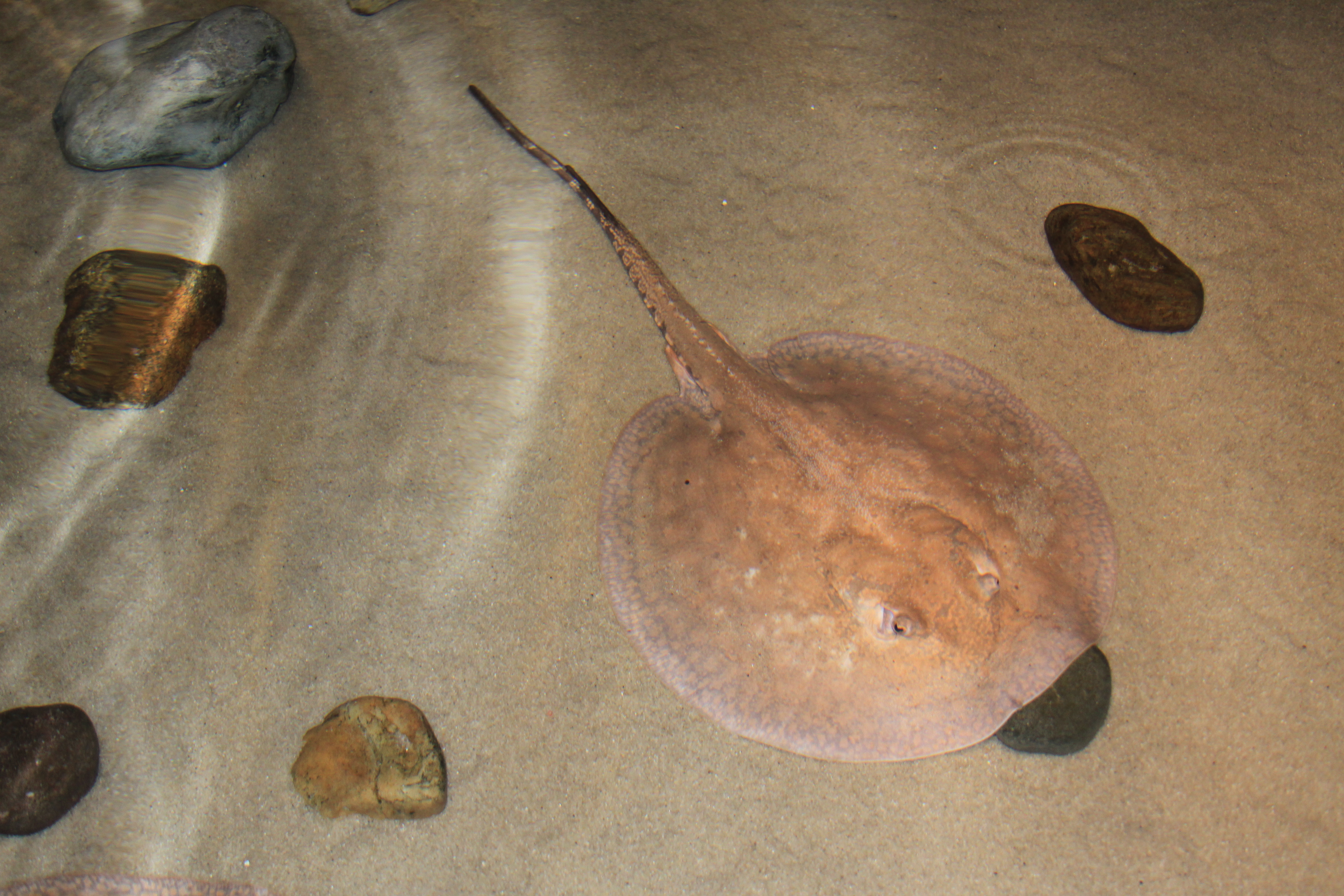
Potamotrygon histrix is one of the most southernly distributed river stingrays, being found in the Río de la Plata Basin

They are native to tropical and subtropical northern, central and eastern South America, living in rivers that drain into the Caribbean, and into the Atlantic as far south as the Río de la Plata in Argentina. A few generalist species are widespread, but most are more restricted and typically native to a single river basin. The greatest species richness can be found in the Amazon, especially the Rio Negro, Tapajós, and Tocantins basins (each home to 8–10 species). The range of several species is limited by waterfalls.

Freshwaters inhabited by members of Potamotrygonidae vary extensively, ranging from lacustrine to fast-flowing rivers, in blackwater, whitewater and clearwater, and on bottoms ranging from sandy to rocky. In at least some species juveniles tend to occur in shallower waters than adults. Most species are strictly freshwater, but a few may range into brackish estuarine habitats in salinities up to at least 12.4‰.

In 2016, two fully marine species formerly included in Himantura were found to belong in Potamotrygonidae, and moved to their own genus Styracura. These are S. schmardae from the tropical West Atlantic, including the Caribbean, and S. pacifica from the tropical East Pacific, including the Galápagos.

Potamotrygonidae are the only family of rays mostly restricted to fresh water habitats. While there are true freshwater species in the family Dasyatidae, for example Urogymnus polylepis, the majority of species in this family are saltwater fish.

== Characteristics ==
Potamotrygon leopoldi is part of a species complex of blackish river rays with contrasting pale spots found in the Tapajós, Xingu and Tocantins basins

River stingrays are almost circular in shape, and range in size from Potamotrygon wallacei, which reaches 31 cm (1.0 ft) in disc width, to the chupare stingray (S. schmardae), which grows up to 2 m (6.6 ft) in disc width. The latter is one of only two marine species in this family (the other is S. pacifica). The largest freshwater species in this family are the discus ray (Paratrygon aiereba) and short-tailed river stingray (Potamotrygon brachyura), which grow up to 1.5–1.6 m (4.9–5.2 ft) in disc width. At up to 220 kg (490 lb), by far the heaviest freshwater member of the family is the short-tailed river stingray, which among South American strict freshwater fish only is matched by the arapaima (Arapaima) and piraíba catfish (Brachyplatystoma filamentosum). In each species in the family Potamotrygonidae, females reach a larger size than the males.

The upper surface is covered with denticles (sharp tooth-like scales). Most species are brownish or greyish and often have distinctive spotted or mottled patterns, but a few species are largely blackish with contrasting pale spots. Juveniles often differ, in some species greatly, in colour and pattern from the adults.

== Behavior ==
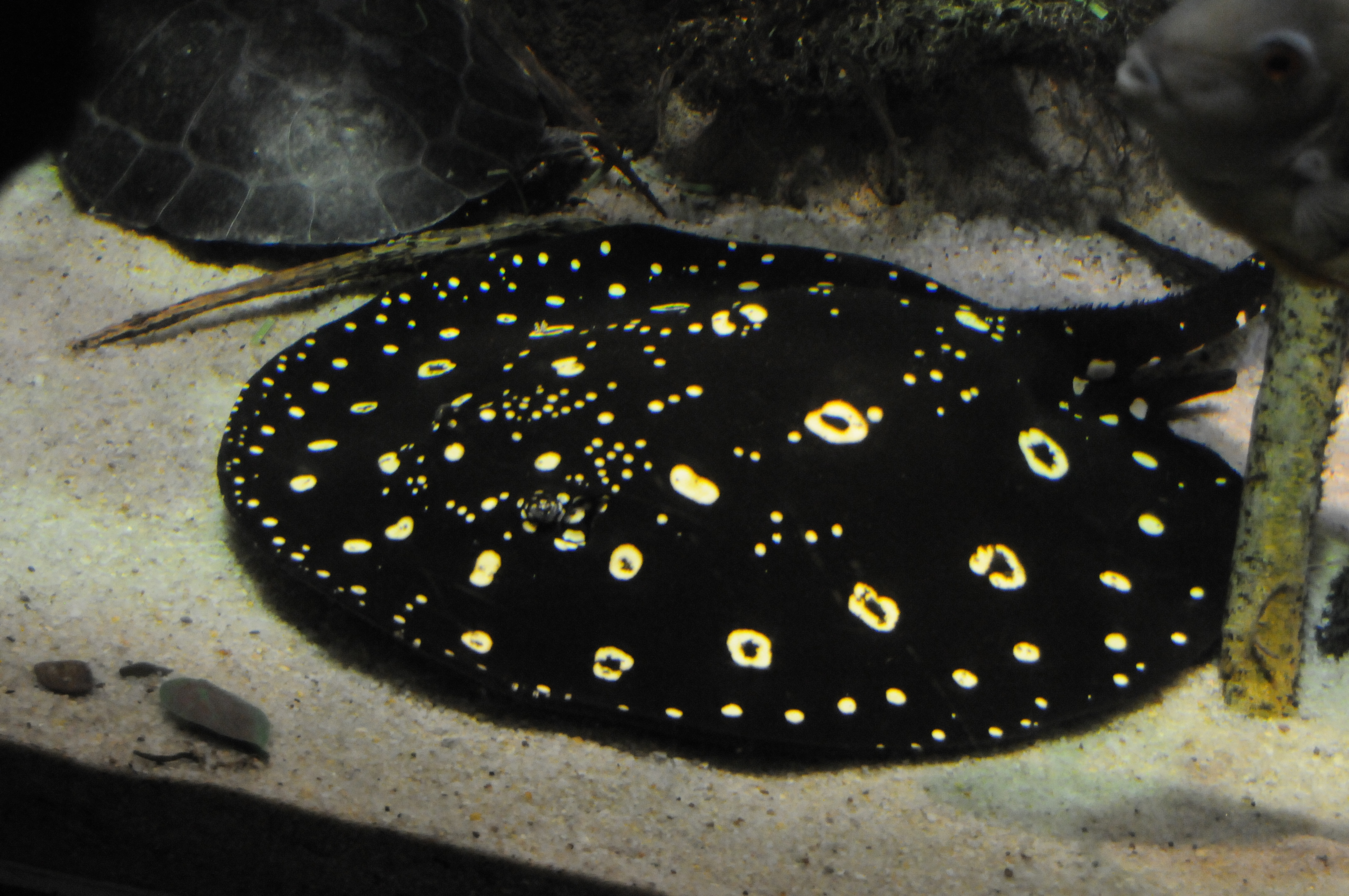
Potamotrygon henlei and its close relatives (e.g., P. leopoldi) mainly feed on snails in the wild, but easily adapt to a more generalized diet in captivity

=== Feeding ===
Members of Potamotrygonidae are predators and feed on a wide range of animals such as insects, worms, molluscs, crustaceans and fish (even spiny catfish). Plant material is sometimes found in their stomachs, but is likely ingested by mistake. The exact diet varies with species; some are generalist predators and others are specialists. For example, Potamotrygon leopoldi mainly feeds on freshwater snails and crabs, although captives easily adapt to a generalist diet. The largest species such as Paratrygon are top predators in their habitat. The jaw joints of stingrays are "loose", allowing them to chew their food in a manner similar to mammals. The family includes both species that are diurnal and species that are nocturnal.

=== Breeding ===
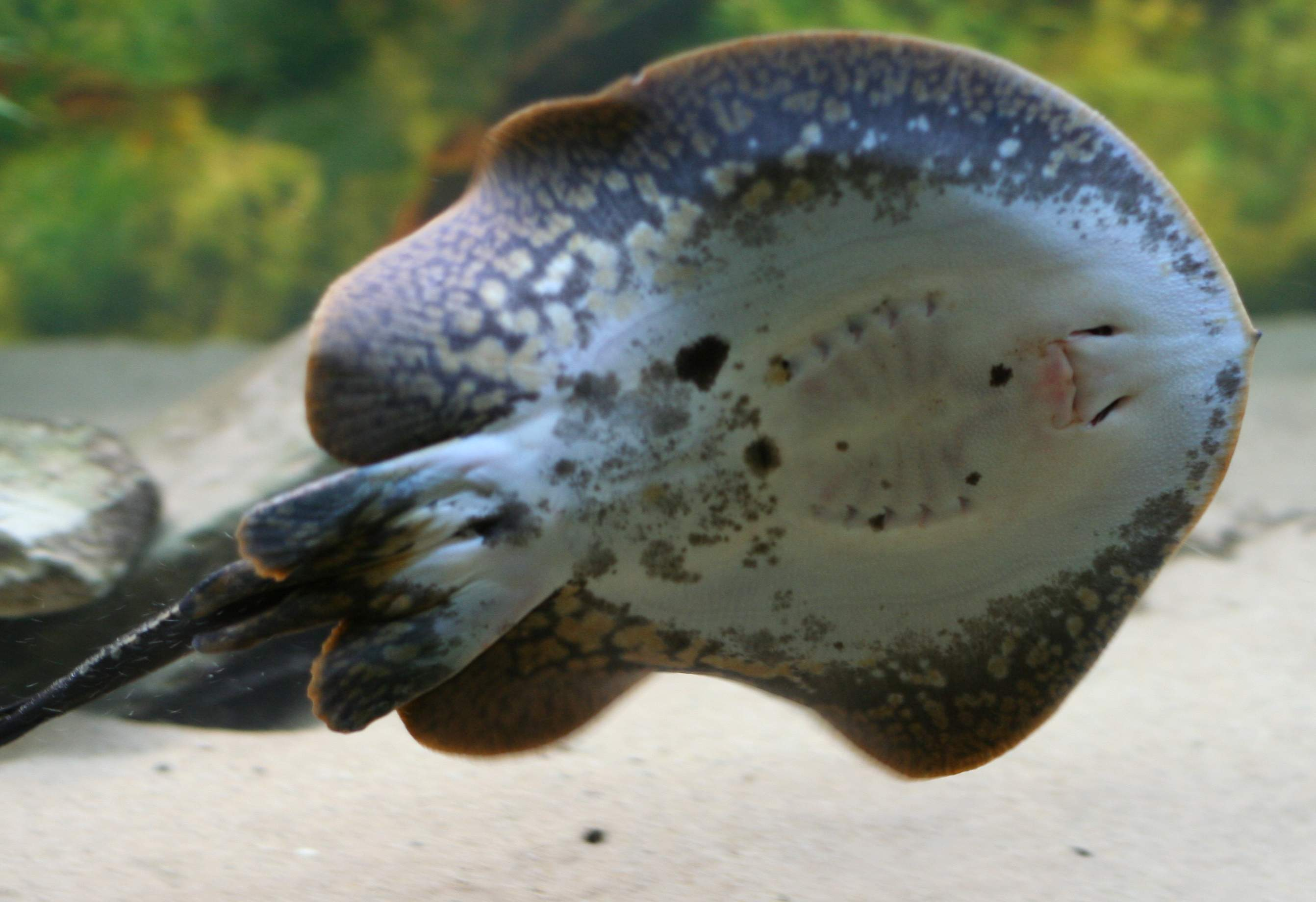
As in other rays, this Plesiotrygon iwamae is easily identified as male by its claspers, the pair of elongated structures at the base of the tail

Like other Elasmobranchs, male freshwater stingrays are easily recognized by their pair of claspers, modifications of the pelvic fins used when mating. Mating occurs in a ventral-to-ventral position and the females give birth to live young. While still in the mother's uterus, the developing embryo feeds on histotroph, a secretion produced by trophonemata glands. Depending on exact species, the gestation period is 3 to 12 months and there are between 1 and 21 young in each litter. The breeding cycle is generally related to flood levels.

== Relationship with humans ==
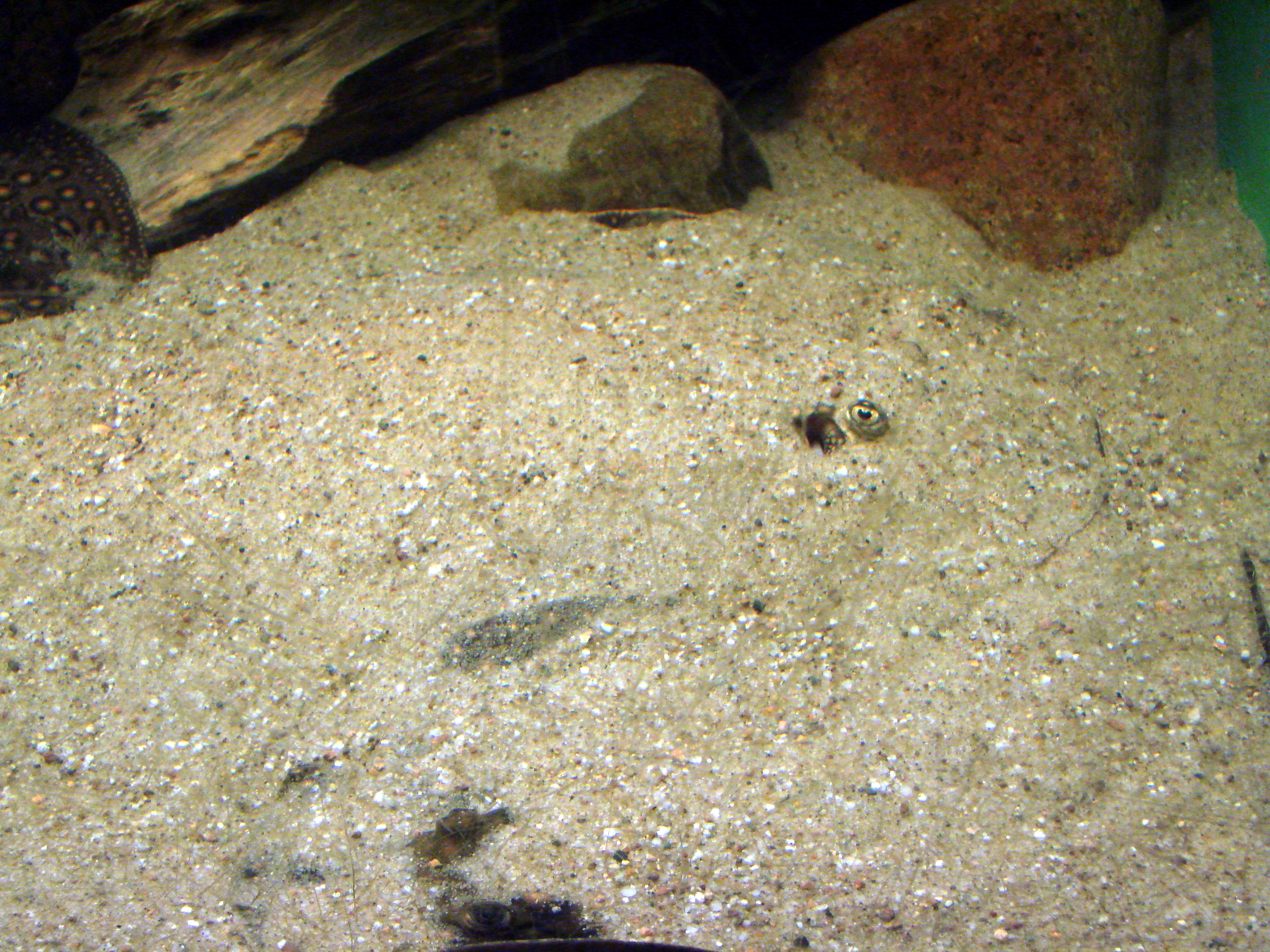
When buried in the sand, stingrays such as this Potamotrygon motoro are barely visible (eye center-right on photo) and easily stepped on

=== Sting ===
Like other stingrays, members of the family Potamotrygonidae have a venomous stinger on the tail (although it is harmless and vestigal or even absent in Heliotrygon). There are generally one or two stingers, and they are periodically shed and replaced. They are some of the most feared freshwater fishes in the Neotropical region because of the injuries they can cause. In Colombia alone, more than 2,000 injuries are reported per year. Freshwater stingrays are generally non-aggressive, and the stingers are used strictly in self-defense. As a consequence injuries typically occur when bathers step on them (injuries to feet or lower legs) or fishers catch them (injuries to hands or arms). In addition to pain caused by the barbed stinger itself and the venom, bacterial infections of the wounds are common and may account for a greater part of the long-term problems in stinging victims than the actual venom. The stings are typically highly painful and are occasionally fatal to humans, especially people living in rural areas that only seek professional medical help when the symptoms have become severe. In general, relatively little is known about the composites of the venom in freshwater stingrays, but it appears to differ (at least in some species) from that of marine stingrays. There are possibly also significant differences between the venoms of the various Potamotrygonidae species. Due to the potential danger they represent, some locals strongly dislike freshwater stingrays and may kill them on sight. A study at the Butantan Institute, São Paulo, Brazil, revealed that the composition of freshwater stingray venom varies according to sex and age, even between individuals of the same species. Each time the environment changes, the feeding of the stingray changes, leading to changes in the composition of toxins and toxicological effects. There is no specific antidote or treatment for freshwater stingray venom.

=== Symptomatology ===
Accidents occur when the rays are stepped on or when the fins are touched, the defensive behavior consists of turning the body, moving the tail and introducing the stinger into the victim. Generally, stingers are inserted into the feet and heels of bathers and the hands of fishermen. Initial symptoms include severe pain, erythema and edema, then necrosis occurs which results in sagging tissue in the affected area and forms a deep ulcer, which develops slowly. Systemic complications include nausea, vomiting, salivation, sweating, respiratory depression, muscle fasciculation and seizures. Once the stinger is torn during penetration into the skin, it can break and cause dentin fragments to be retained in the wound. The stinger can cause laceration, which results in secondary infection, usually caused by Pseudomonas and Staphylococcus. If the stinger reaches internal organs, it can be fatal.

=== As food ===
Freshwater stingrays are often caught by hook-and-line and as bycatch in trawls. In the Amazon, Paratrygon and certain Potamotrygon are the most caught species and the first is the most sought. In the Río de la Plata region, the meat of P. brachyura is particularly prized and locally the species is called raya fina (fine ray). Freshwater rays weighing less than 2 kg (4.4 lb) are generally discarded, but have a low survival rate. Their meat is mainly consumed locally, but is also exported to Japan and South Korea. From 2005 to 2010, the reported capture in the Brazilian states of Amazonas and Pará has ranged between 584.5 and 1,104.5 metric tons (575.3–1,087.1 long tons) per year. In contrast, some fishers believe they only can be used for traditional medicine, incorrectly thinking that the meat (not just the tail region around the stinger) is toxic.

=== In captivity ===
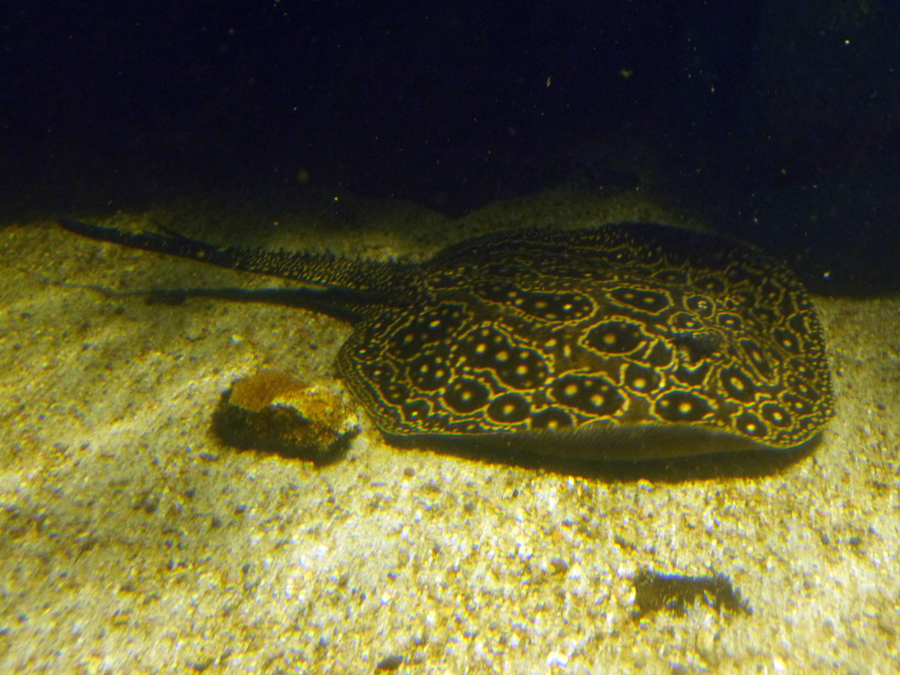
Potamotrygon jabuti is a valuable species in the aquarium trade, but export of wild-caught individuals from Brazil (as opposed to captive bred) is illegal.

Freshwater stingrays are often kept in aquariums, but require a very large tank and will eat small tank mates. Although generally non-aggressive, their venomous stinger represents a risk and on occasion aquarists have been stung. The ease of keeping varies significantly: Some such as Potamotrygon motoro are considered relatively hardy in a captive setting, while others such as Paratrygon aiereba, Plesiotrygon nana and Potamotrygon tigrina are much more difficult to maintain.

Several species are commonly bred in captivity, especially at East and Southeast Asian fish farms, which produce thousands of offspring each year. The more serious captive breeding efforts only began in the late 1990s when Brazil put in restrictions on their export of wild-caught individuals. Some captive farms produce hybrids (both intentionally to get offspring with new patterns and unintentionally because of a lack of males), but this practice is generally discouraged. In several US states there are regulations in place that limit the keeping of freshwater stingrays.

== Conservation ==
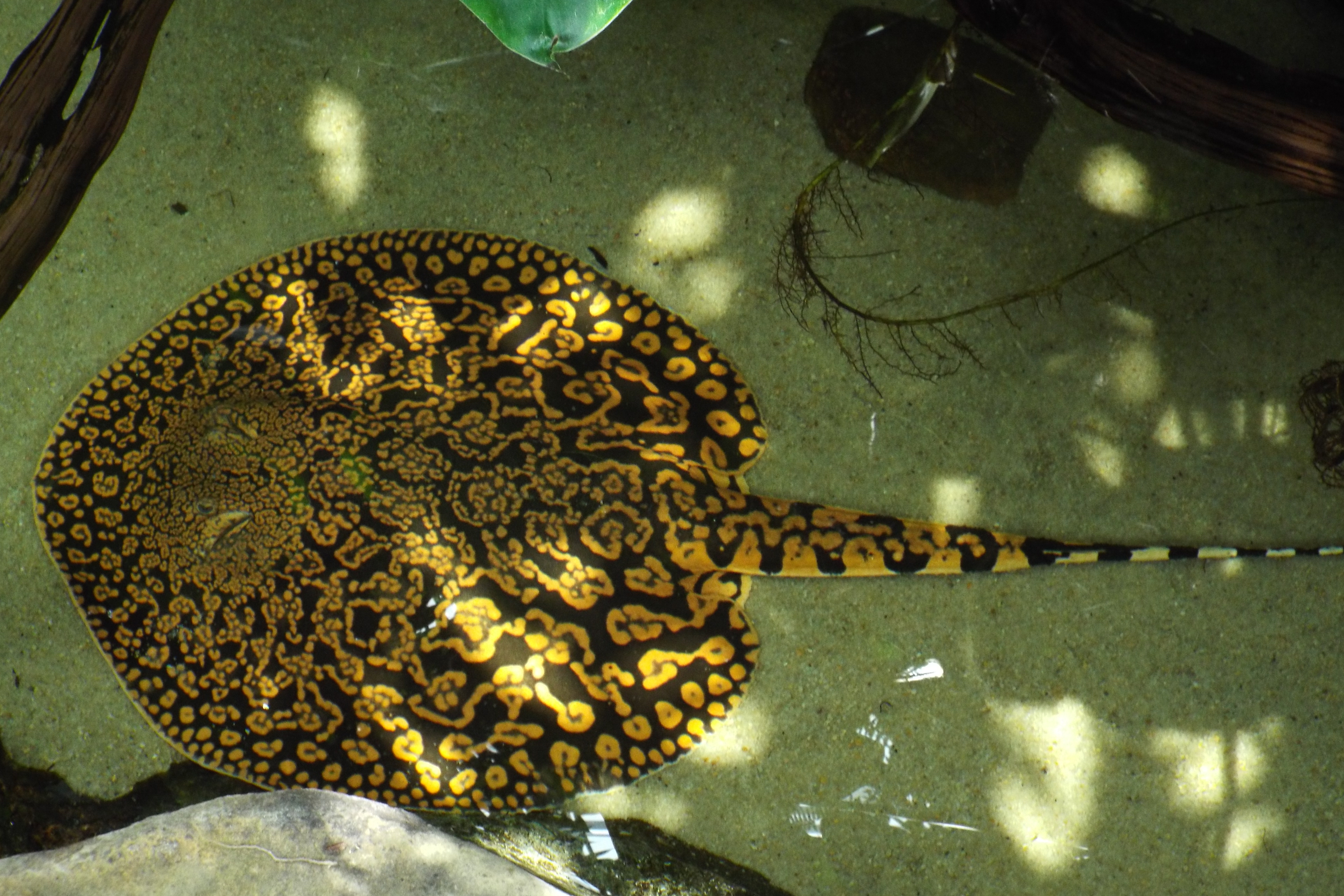
Potamotrygon tigrina is an endangered species that only was scientifically described in 2011

The status of most species is relatively poorly known, but overall it is suspected that river stingrays are declining due to capture (for food and the aquarium industry) and habitat loss (mainly due to dams and pollution from mining).

Zoos and public aquariums in Europe and North America have initiated programs, including studbooks, for several Potamotrygonidae species.

=== Dams ===
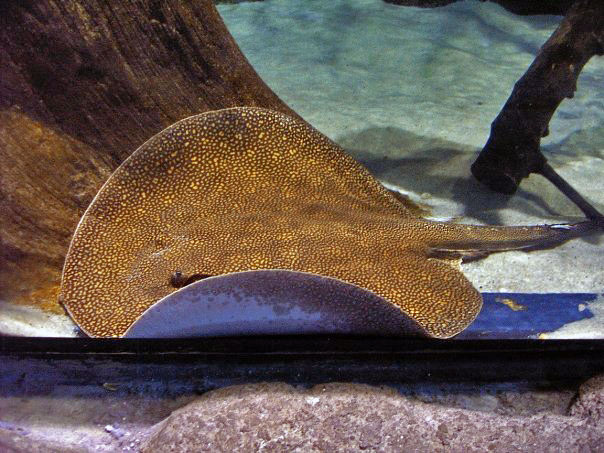
Some freshwater rays are threatened by dams, but Potamotrygon falkneri was able to spread to the upper Paraná basin due to the Itaipu Dam

Dams represent a risk to some species, but others may benefit from them. For example, the Guaíra Falls disappeared after the completion of the Itaipu Dam, allowing Potamotrygon amandae (formerly misidentified as P. motoro) and P. falkneri to spread into the upper Paraná basin. When the Tucuruí Dam was completed, there was an increase in potential prey animals, allowing the population of P. henlei to increase. In contrast, dams threaten some species such as P. magdalenae by isolating populations and preventing gene flow, and others such as P. brachyura generally avoid lentic habitats, including the reservoirs created by river impoundment.

=== Fishing and capture ===
In addition to the large numbers caught for food (hundred of tons per year in the Brazilian Amazon alone), many are killed because of the risk their stings represent to locals and tourists. In the Amazon, it has been estimated that many thousand river stingrays are removed from certain areas to minimize the risk to ecotourism. Such removal is unregulated by the authorities, as not considered fishing in the traditional sense.

Initially Brazil completely banned all exports of wild-caught freshwater stingrays for the aquarium trade, but have since introduced quotas for some species. From 2010 to 2015, between c. 4,600 and 5,700 of six species (the vast majority were P. leopoldi and P. wallacei; the latter formerly referred to as P. cf. histrix) were legally exported from Brazil per year. The income generated from these are important to several small fishing communities. Other primary exporters of wild-caught freshwater stingrays are Colombia and Peru. A level of illegal exports also occur, and to curb this Paratrygon aiereba (in Colombia) and several Potamotrygon species (in Brazil and Colombia) have been included on CITES Appendix III. It has been suggested that all members of the family should be included on Appendix III, with Paratrygon and a few Potamotrygon species on Appendix II.

== Taxonomy and species ==
The taxonomy of the river stingrays is complex and undescribed species remain. The two species of Styracura were only moved to this family in 2016. Among the freshwater species, Heliotrygon and Paratrygon are sister genera, and Plesiotrygon and Potamotrygon are sister genera.

Subfamily Styracurinae

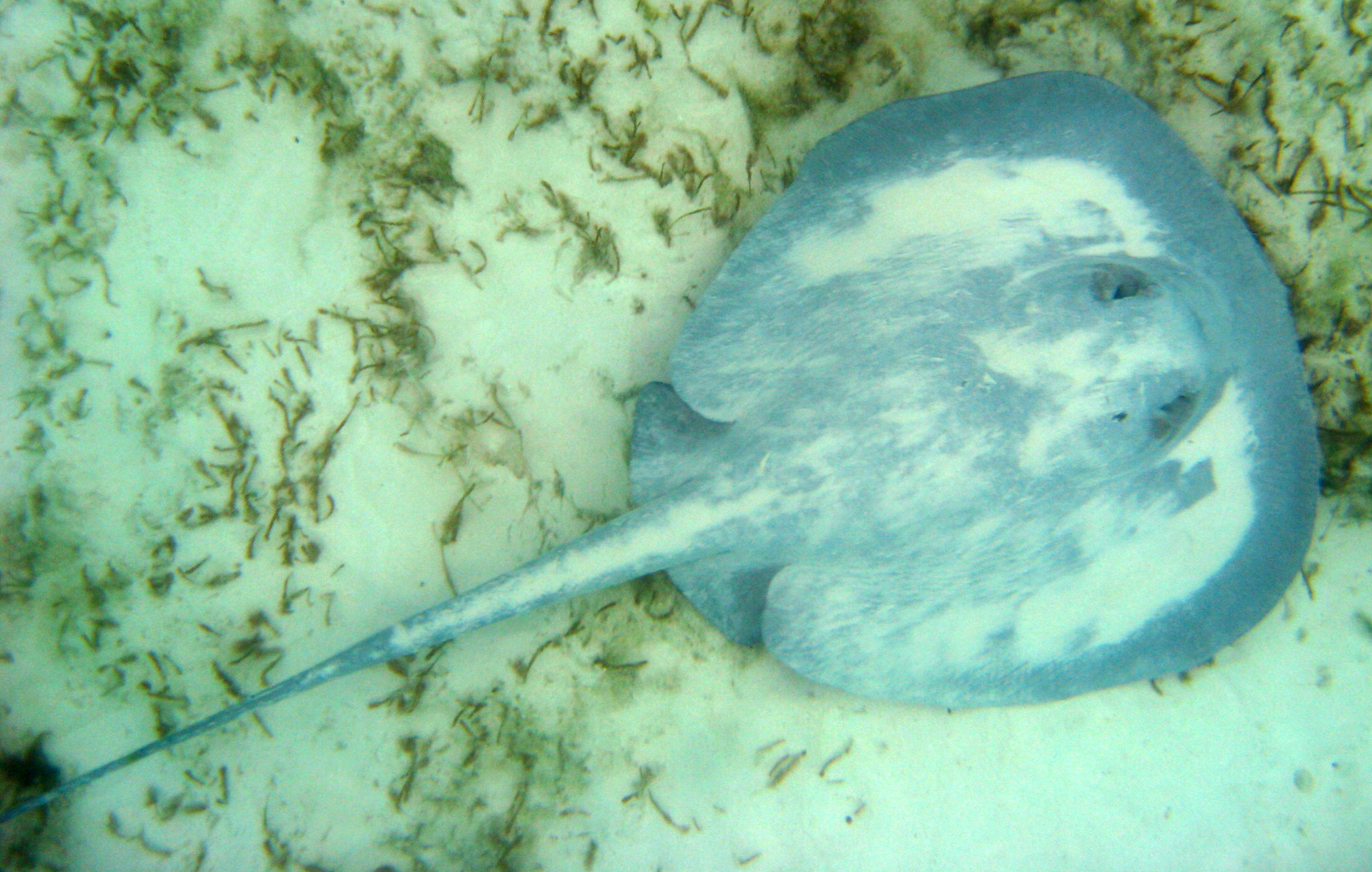
The two Styracura (here S. schmardae) are the only members of the family from marine waters

- Genus Styracura Carvalho, Loboda & da Silva, 2016
  - Styracura pacifica (Beebe & Tee-Van, 1941) (Pacific chupare)
  - Styracura schmardae (Werner, 1904) (Chupare stingray)

Subfamily Potamotrygoninae

- Genus Heliotrygon Carvalho & Lovejoy, 2011
  - Heliotrygon gomesi Carvalho & Lovejoy, 2011 (Gomes's round ray)
  - Heliotrygon rosai Carvalho & Lovejoy, 2011 (Rosa's round ray)

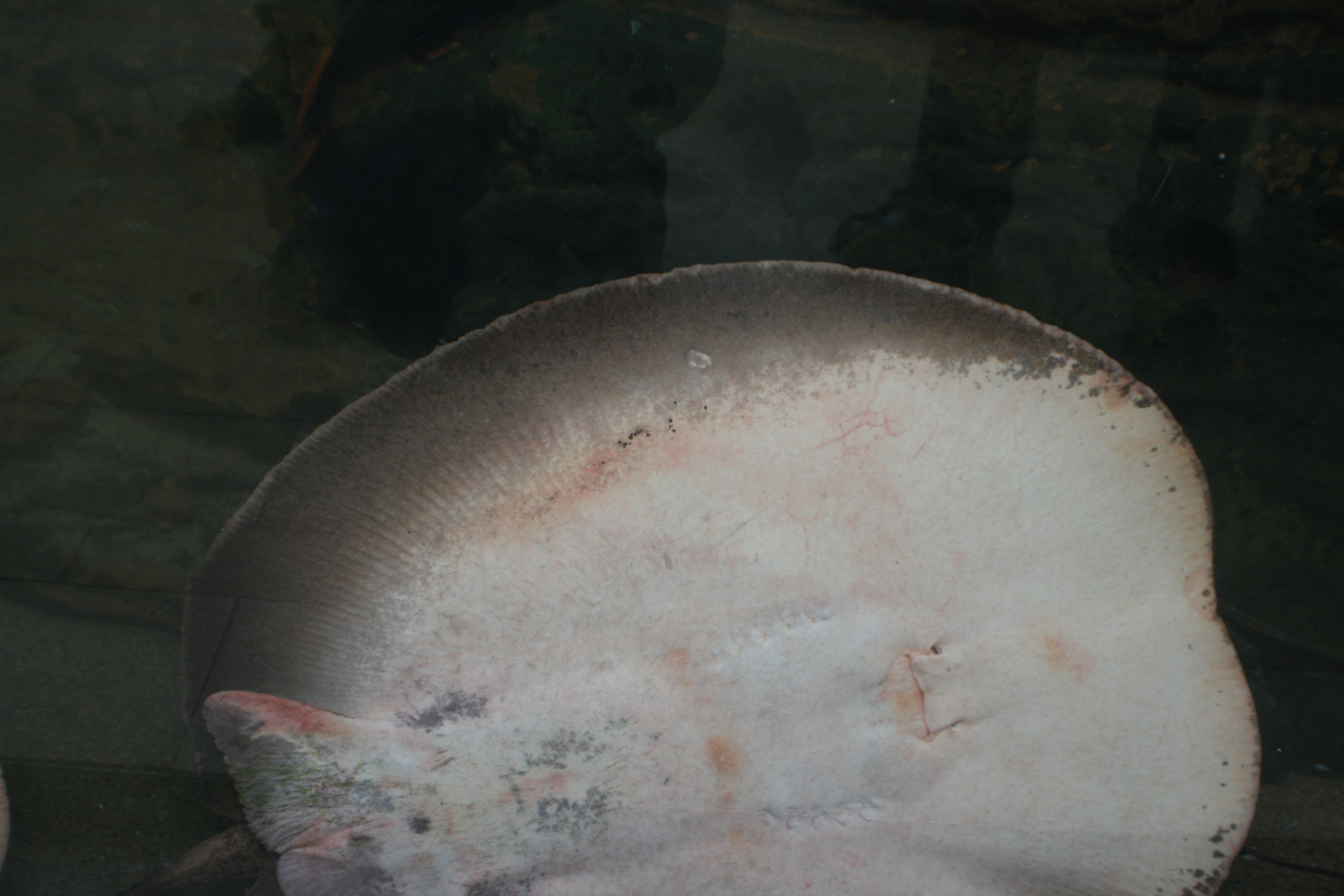
At up to 1.6 m (5.2 ft) in disc width and 110 kg (240 lb) in weight, Paratrygon aiereba is one of the largest species in the family

- Genus Paratrygon A. H. A. Duméril, 1865
  - Paratrygon aiereba J. P. Müller & Henle, 1841 (Discus ray)
  - Paratrygon orinocensis Loboda, Lasso, Rosa & De Carvalho, 2021
  - Paratrygon parvaspina Loboda, Lasso, Rosa & De Carvalho, 2021
  - Paratrygon raonii Loboda, 2026
  - Paratrygon munduruku Loboda, 2026
  - Paratrygon araguaia Loboda, 2026
  - Paratrygon lucindai Loboda, 2026

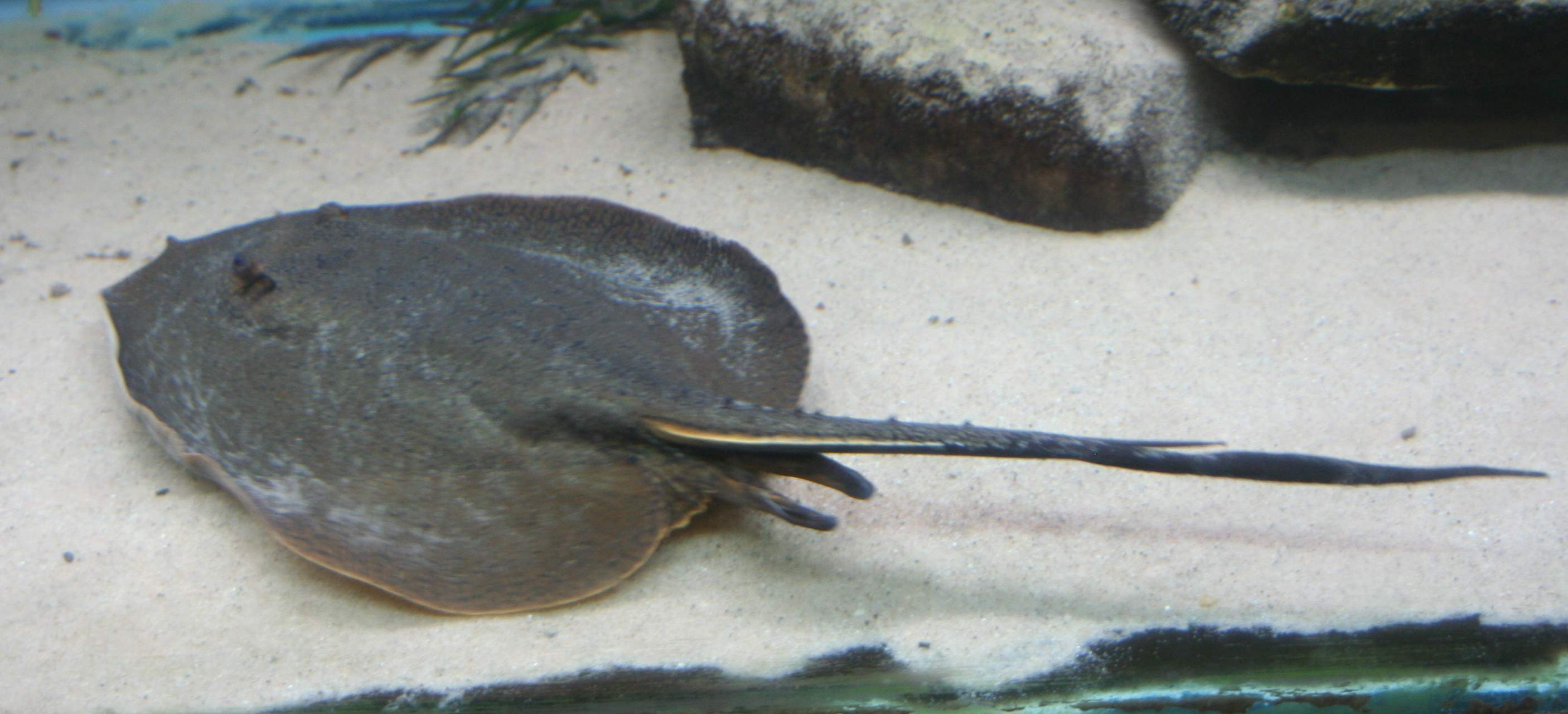
Plesiotrygon (here P. iwamae with part of tail missing) is very long-tailed compared to other genera in the family

- Genus Plesiotrygon Rosa, Castello & Thorson, 1987
  - Plesiotrygon iwamae Rosa, Castello & Thorson, 1987 (Long-tailed river stingray)
  - Plesiotrygon nana Carvalho & Ragno, 2011 (Black-tailed antenna ray)

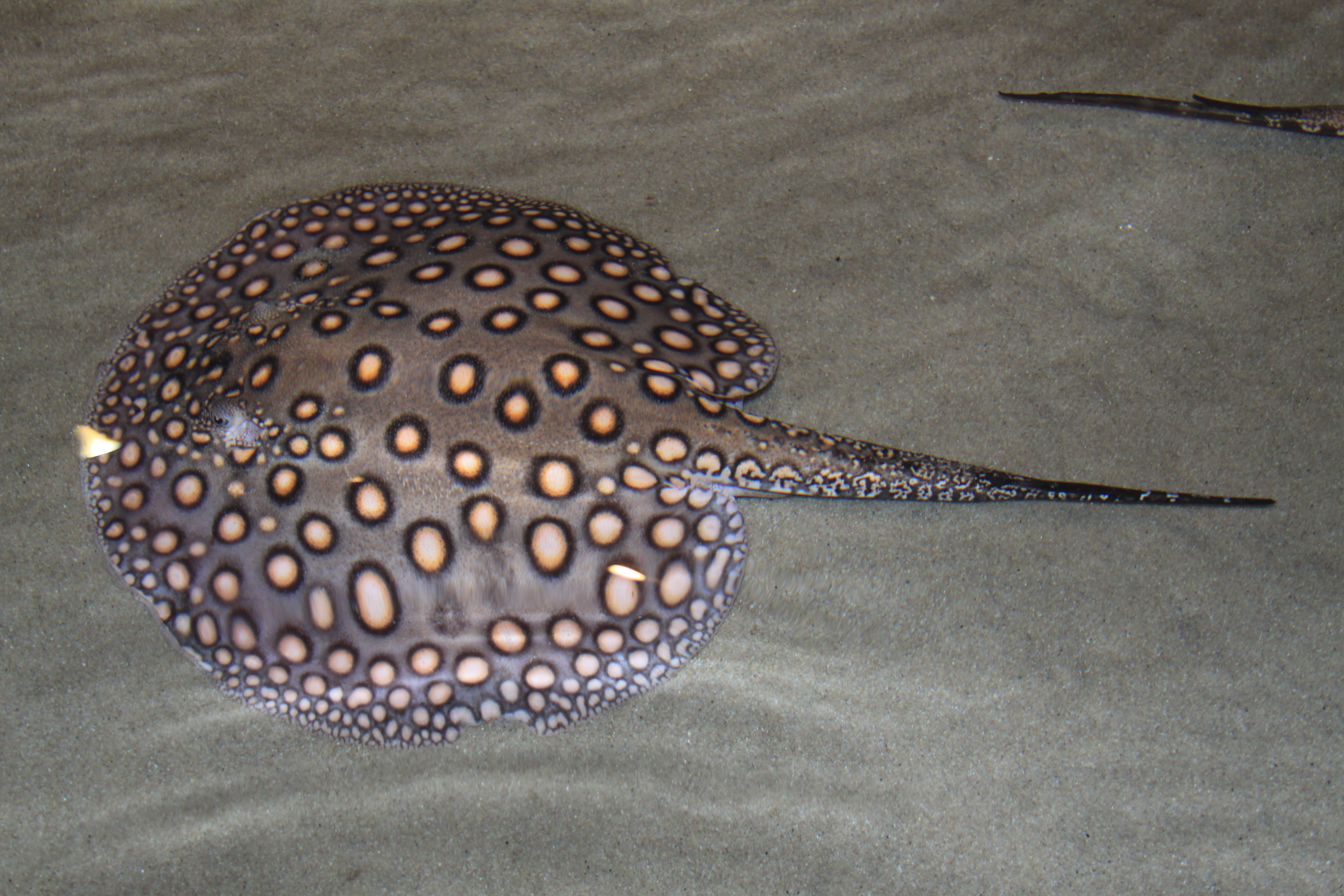
Potamotrygon motoro is one of the best-known and most widespread species in the family

- Genus Potamotrygon Garman, 1877
  - Potamotrygon adamastor J. P. Fontenelle & M.R. de Carvalho, 2017
  - Potamotrygon albimaculata M. R. de Carvalho, 2016 (Itaituba river stingray, Tapajós river stingray)
  - Potamotrygon amandae Loboda & M. R. de Carvalho, 2013
  - Potamotrygon amazona J. P. Fontenelle & M.R. de Carvalho, 2017
  - Potamotrygon boesemani Rosa, M. R. de Carvalho & Almeida Wanderley, 2008 (Boeseman's river stingray, emperor ray)
  - Potamotrygon brachyura (Günther, 1880) (Short-tailed river stingray)
  - Potamotrygon constellata (Vaillant, 1880) (Thorny river stingray)
  - Potamotrygon falkneri Castex & Maciel, 1963 (Largespot river stingray)
  - Potamotrygon garmani J. P. Fontenelle & M.R. de Carvalho, 2017
  - Potamotrygon henlei (Castelnau, 1855) (Bigtooth river stingray)
  - Potamotrygon humerosa Garman, 1913
  - Potamotrygon histrix (J. P. Müller & Henle, 1834) (Porcupine river stingray)
  - Potamotrygon jabuti M. R. de Carvalho, 2016 (Pearl river stingray)
  - Potamotrygon leopoldi Castex & Castello, 1970 (White-blotched river stingray)
  - Potamotrygon limai Fontenelle, J. P. C. B. da Silva & M. R. de Carvalho, 2014
  - Potamotrygon magdalenae (A. H. A. Duméril, 1865) (Magdalena river stingray)
  - Potamotrygon marinae Deynat, 2006
  - Potamotrygon marquesi Silva & Loboda, 2019
  - Potamotrygon motoro (J. P. Müller]& Henle, 1841) (Ocellate river stingray)
  - Potamotrygon ocellata (Engelhardt, 1912) (Red-blotched river stingray)
  - Potamotrygon orbignyi (Castelnau, 1855) (Smoothback river stingray)
  - Potamotrygon pantanensis Loboda & M. R. de Carvalho, 2013
  - Potamotrygon rex Loboda & M. R. de Carvalho, 2016 (Great river stingray)
  - Potamotrygon schroederi Fernández-Yépez, 1958 (Rosette river stingray)
  - Potamotrygon schuhmacheri Castex, 1964 (Parana River stingray)
  - Potamotrygon scobina Garman, 1913 (Raspy river stingray)
  - Potamotrygon signata Garman, 1913 (Parnaiba River stingray)
  - Potamotrygon tatianae J. P. C. B. da Silva & M. R. de Carvalho, 2011
  - Potamotrygon tigrina [M. R. de Carvalho, Sabaj Pérez & Lovejoy, 2011 (Tiger ray)
  - Potamotrygon wallacei M. R. de Carvalho, R. S. Rosa & M. L. G. Araújo, 2016 (Cururu ray)
  - Potamotrygon yepezi Castex & Castello, 1970 (Maracaibo River stingray)
