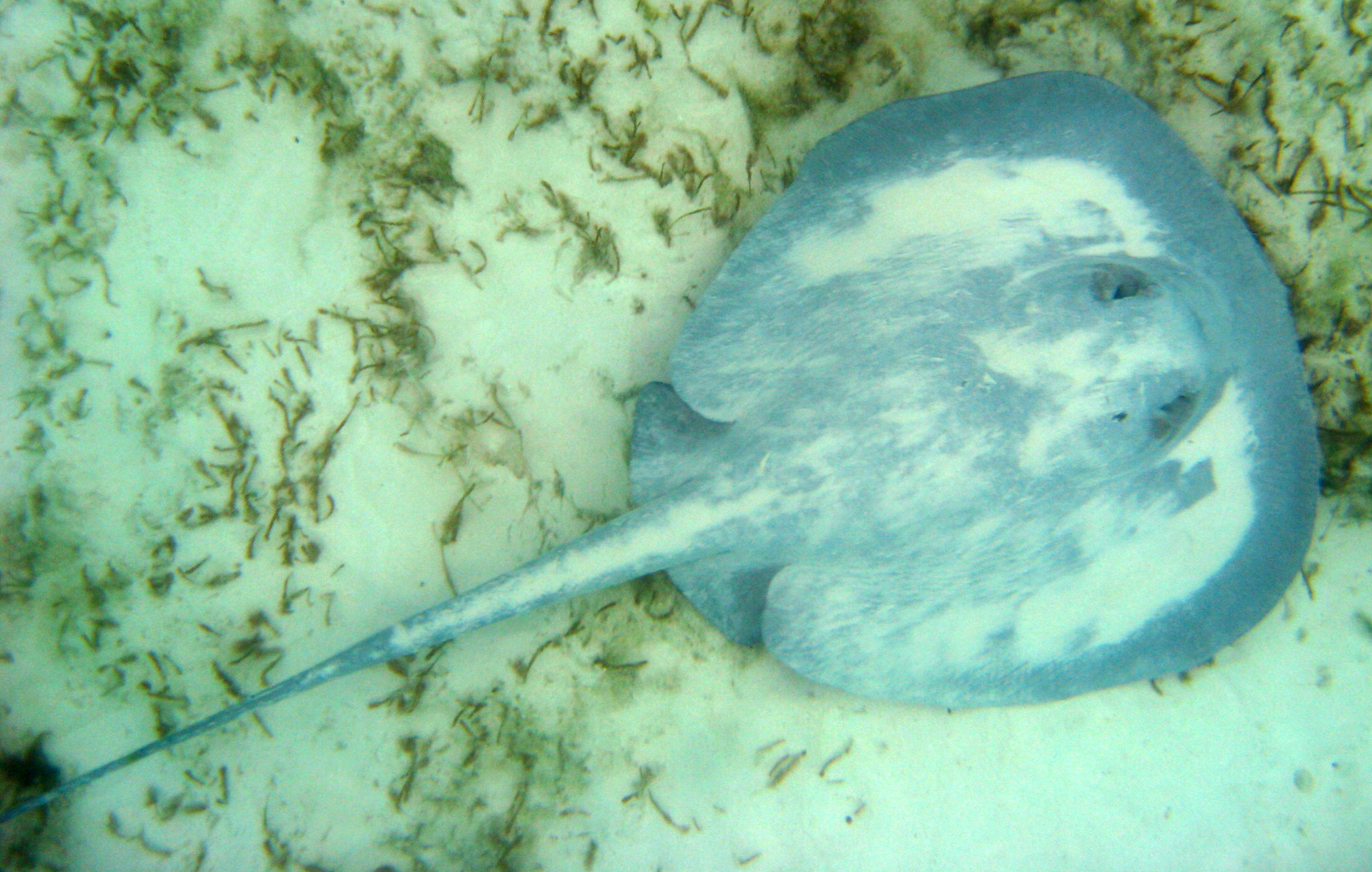
- Styracura schmardae

Scientific classification
- Kingdom: Animalia
- Phylum: Chordata
- Class: Chondrichthyes
- Subclass: Elasmobranchii
- Order: Myliobatiformes
- Family: Potamotrygonidae
- Subfamily: Styracurinae; Carvalho, Loboda & da Silva, 2016
- Genus: Styracura; Carvalho, Loboda & Silva, 2016

Type species
- Trygon schmardae Werner, 1904

= Styracura =

Genus of cartilaginous fishes

Styracura is a genus of stingray in the family Potamotrygonidae and the only genus in the subfamily Styracurinae. The two species in this genus were formerly included in Himantura, but were moved to Styracura in 2016 based on morphology and molecular evidence. Unlike other members of the family Potamotrygonidae, also known as freshwater stingrays, Styracura are found in the tropical West Atlantic and East Pacific.

== Species ==
There are two species in the genus:

- Pacific chupare (Styracura pacifica)
- Chupare stingray (Styracura schmardae)
