= Heliotrygon rosai =

Conservation status
- Vulnerable (IUCN 3.1)

Scientific classification
- Kingdom: Animalia
- Phylum: Chordata
- Class: Chondrichthyes
- Subclass: Elasmobranchii
- Order: Myliobatiformes
- Family: Potamotrygonidae
- Genus: Heliotrygon
- Species: H. rosai

Binomial name
- Heliotrygon rosai M. R. de Carvalho & Lovejoy, 2011

Species of cartilaginous fish

Heliotrygon rosai, or Rosa's round ray, is a species of freshwater fish in the family Potamotrygonidae. It is native to the Amazon basin (Marajó to Peru) in South America. Its maximum disc width is 80 cm (2.6 ft) and the stinger is greatly reduced, rendering it virtually harmless. It is listed as vulnerable by the IUCN red list.
