= Potamotrygonocotyle dromedarius =

Scientific classification
- Kingdom: Animalia
- Phylum: Platyhelminthes
- Class: Monogenea
- Order: Monocotylidea
- Family: Monocotylidae
- Genus: Potamotrygonocotyle
- Species: P. dromedarius

Binomial name
- Potamotrygonocotyle dromedarius Domingues & Marques, 2007

Species of flatworm

Potamotrygonocotyle dromedarius is a species of monogenean parasites of Brazilian stingrays in which it infects the gills. Specifically, it infect four different species of stingray: Ocellate river stingray (Potamotrygon motoro), Bigtooth river stingray (P. henlei), Xingu River ray (P. leopoldi), and an unidentified species of Potamotrygon.
