= Raspy river stingray =

Conservation status
- Near Threatened (IUCN 3.1)

Scientific classification
- Kingdom: Animalia
- Phylum: Chordata
- Class: Chondrichthyes
- Subclass: Elasmobranchii
- Order: Myliobatiformes
- Family: Potamotrygonidae
- Genus: Potamotrygon
- Species: P. scobina

Binomial name
- Potamotrygon scobina Garman, 1913

Species of cartilaginous fish

The raspy river stingray, mosaic stingray or arraia (Potamotrygon scobina) is a species of freshwater fish in the family Potamotrygonidae. This stingray is endemic to the Amazon basin in Brazil, where known from the Amazon–Pará River (Belém to near the confluence with the Putumayo River), the Madeira River basin, Uatumã River and lower Tocantins River.

It reaches up to 69 cm (2 ft 3 in) in disc width and 132.5 cm (4 ft 4.2 in) in total length. It is fairly common, but threatened by habitat loss. It is part of a group consisting of five allopatric Amazonian stingrays, the others being P. adamastor (Uraricoera River), P. amazona (Juruá, Jutaí and Rio Negro), P. garmani (mid to upper Tocantins River) and P. limai (Jamari River). These all have three angular cartilages (as opposed to the one or two seen in other species in the genus).
