= Potamotrygonocotyle chisholmae =

Scientific classification
- Kingdom: Animalia
- Phylum: Platyhelminthes
- Class: Monogenea
- Order: Monocotylidea
- Family: Monocotylidae
- Genus: Potamotrygonocotyle
- Species: P. chisholmae

Binomial name
- Potamotrygonocotyle chisholmae Domingues & Marques, 2007

Species of flatworm

Potamotrygonocotyle chisholmae is a species of parasitic monogenean flatworms. The species was first described from gills of Potamotrygon stingray from Brazil.
