= Euzetia occultum =

Scientific classification
- Domain: Eukaryota
- Kingdom: Animalia
- Phylum: Platyhelminthes
- Class: Monogenea
- Order: Monocotylidea
- Family: Monocotylidae
- Genus: Euzetia
- Species: E. occultum

Binomial name
- Euzetia occultum Chisholm & Whittington 2001

Species of flatworm

Euzetia occultum is a species of flatworm which parasitizes the gills of the Australian cownose ray and is the type species for its genus. It can be distinguished from Euzetia lamothei based on its overall size and reproductive morphology.
