= Potamotrygonocotyle uruguayensis =

Scientific classification
- Kingdom: Animalia
- Phylum: Platyhelminthes
- Class: Monogenea
- Order: Monocotylidea
- Family: Monocotylidae
- Genus: Potamotrygonocotyle
- Species: P. uruguayensis

Binomial name
- Potamotrygonocotyle uruguayensis Domingues & Marques, 2007

Species of flatworm

Potamotrygonocotyle uruguayensis is a species of monogenean flatworms, first described in 2007. It is a parasite, living in the gills of Short-tailed river stingrays (Potamotrygon brachyura).

The Latin name uruguayensis refers to the Uruguay River, in which it is found.
