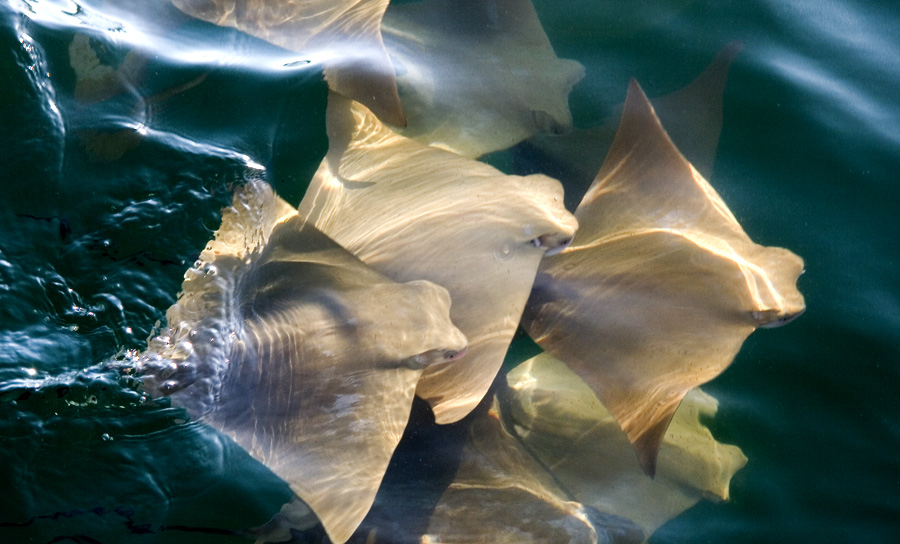

Conservation status
- Near Threatened (IUCN 3.1)

Scientific classification
- Kingdom: Animalia
- Phylum: Chordata
- Class: Chondrichthyes
- Subclass: Elasmobranchii
- Order: Myliobatiformes
- Family: Rhinopteridae
- Genus: Rhinoptera
- Species: R. steindachneri

Binomial name
- Rhinoptera steindachneri Evermann & O. P. Jenkins, 1891

= Golden cownose ray =

Species of ray

Golden cownose rays swimming

The golden cownose ray or Pacific cownose ray (Rhinoptera steindachneri) is a species of ray. It is found in the East Pacific along the coast of Colombia, Costa Rica, Ecuador, El Salvador, Guatemala, Honduras, Mexico, Nicaragua, Panama, and Peru. Its natural habitats are open seas, shallow seas, subtidal aquatic beds, estuarine waters, intertidal marshes, and coastal saline lagoons. They are often in schools, and sometimes associated with the spotted eagle ray.

Like all members of eagle rays, they demonstrate ovoviviparity. Ovulation and birth occurred in May, June and July, with a low fecundity, large size at maturity and birth and a continuous and synchronous annual reproductive cycle.

According to Joseph Bizzarro, Wade Smith, J. Fernando Márquez-Farías, and Robert E. Hueter, these rays are not of much value within fisheries and are harmless to humans, however one of the main threats to this species is overexploitation and habitat destruction.

The parasites that inhabit this species are most influenced by body size, diet, and feeding behavior.
