= Euzetia lamothei =

Scientific classification
- Domain: Eukaryota
- Kingdom: Animalia
- Phylum: Platyhelminthes
- Class: Monogenea
- Order: Monocotylidea
- Family: Monocotylidae
- Genus: Euzetia
- Species: E. lamothei

Binomial name
- Euzetia lamothei Pulido-Flores & Monks 2008

Species of flatworm

Euzetia lamothei is a flatworm which parasitizes the gills of the cownose ray. It is named after Dr. Marcos Rafael Lamothe Argumedo, a professor at Universidad Nacional Autónoma de México who has done research on Monogeneans. The species averages 405 micrometers long by 178 micrometers wide. It can be distinguished from its closest relative, Euzetia occultum, based on size (E. lamothei is considerably smaller than E. occultum) and the morphology of the reproductive organs.
