= Potamotrygonocotyle =

Scientific classification
- Domain: Eukaryota
- Kingdom: Animalia
- Phylum: Platyhelminthes
- Class: Monogenea
- Order: Monocotylidea
- Family: Monocotylidae
- Genus: Potamotrygonocotyle; Mayes, Brooks & Thorson, 1981

Genus of flatworms

Potamotrygonocotyle is a genus of monogeneans that parasitise stingrays of the genus Potamotrygon. From 1981 the genus contained only one member, Potamotrygonocotyle tsalickisi, until four new species were described in 2007.

== Species ==
- Potamotrygonocotyle chisholmae Domingues & Marques, 2007
- Potamotrygonocotyle dromedarius Domingues & Marques, 2007
- Potamotrygonocotyle eurypotamoxenus Domingues & Marques, 2007
- Potamotrygonocotyle tsalickisi Mayes, Brooks & Thorson, 1981
- Potamotrygonocotyle uruguayensis Domingues & Marques, 2007
