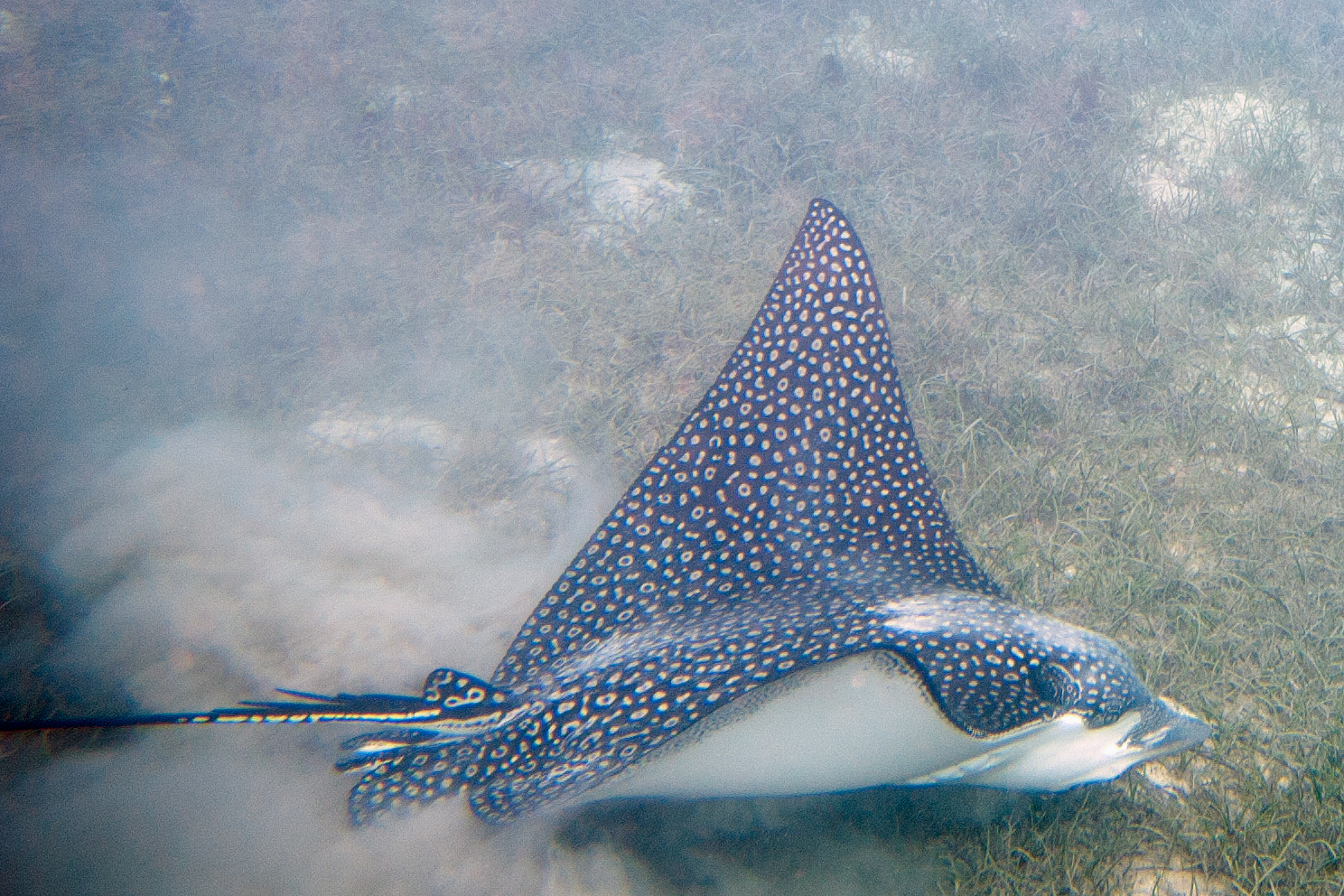
- Aetobatus ocellatus in Fiji

Scientific classification
- Kingdom: Animalia
- Phylum: Chordata
- Class: Chondrichthyes
- Subclass: Elasmobranchii
- Order: Myliobatiformes
- Family: Aetobatidae
- Genus: Aetobatus; Blainville, 1816

= Aetobatus =

Aetobatus Temporal range: 59–0 Ma Thanetian to Present

Genus of cartilaginous fishes

Aetobatus (from Ancient Greek ἀετός (aetós), meaning "eagle", and βάτος (bátos), meaning "ray") is a genus of eagle rays native to the Atlantic, Pacific and Indian Oceans. It was formerly placed in Myliobatidae, but is now placed in its own family Aetobatidae based on salient differences from myliobatids, especially the pectoral fins joining the head at the level of the eyes.

== Description ==
This genus is diagnosed by a large adult size, which is around 3 m (9.8 ft) wide and largely consisting of a wing-like rhomboidal "disc" (pectoral fins). The trunk is broad, depressed, and thick. The head protrudes forward anteriorly, is narrow, and elevated above the disc, which connects with the head at the level of the eyes. The spiracles are located dorsally and angles towards the sides. The mouth is broad, located ventrally, contains a single tooth plate row, and is surrounded by sensory pores and papillae. The internasal flap possesses a deep "V" shaped notch. A single dorsal fin arises near the base of the very long whip-like tail, which is armed by one or more stinging barbs.

There are currently either 3 or 5 recognized extant species in this genus depending on the status of A. narinari:

Image	Species	Common name	Distribution
	Aetobatus flagellum (Bloch & J. G. Schneider, 1801)	Long-headed eagle ray	Indo-West Pacific
	Aetobatus laticeps (T. N. Gill, 1865)	Pacific white-spotted eagle ray	Baja California to northern Peru, including the Galápagos
	Aetobatus narinari (Euphrasén, 1790)	Spotted eagle ray	Atlantic (including the Caribbean and Gulf of Mexico); worldwide if A. ocellatus and A. laticeps are considered subspecies
	Aetobatus narutobiei W. T. White, Furumitsu, A. Yamaguchi, 2013	Naru eagle ray	northwest Pacific off south Japan, South Korea, China, Hong Kong and Vietnam
	Aetobatus ocellatus (Kuhl, 1823)	Ocellated eagle ray	Indo-West Pacific

There are also 6 extinct species (only known from fossil remains) placed in this genus:

- †Aetobatus arcuatus Agassiz 1843
- †Aetobatus cappettai Antunes & Balbino 2006
- †Aetobatus irregularis Agassiz 1843
- †Aetobatus punctatus Miller 1876
- †Aetobatus poeyi Fernández de Castro 1873
- †Aetobatus sinhaleyus Deraniyagala 1937

Cladogram based on a maximum likelihood phylogenetic tree using a General Time Reversible (GTR+I+G) model based on an alignment of mitochondrial NADH2 sequences (1044 sites):

- - - Myliobatidae
    - - Mobulidae
      - Rhinopteridae
  - Aetobatus
    - - - Aetobatus laticeps
        - Aetobatus narinari
      - Aetobatus ocellatus
    - - Aetobatus flagellum
      - Aetobatus narutobiei
- Dasyatis spp.

== See also ==
- List of prehistoric cartilaginous fish genera
