= Euzetia =

Scientific classification
- Kingdom: Animalia
- Phylum: Platyhelminthes
- Class: Monogenea
- Order: Monocotylidea
- Family: Monocotylidae
- Genus: Euzetia; Chisholm & Whittington, 2001

Group of flatworms

Euzetia is the only genus in the subfamily Euzetiinae, a group of flatworms which parasitize Elasmobranchs. As of 2008, only two species have been described in the genus, however others may remain undescribed. The genus consists of Euzetia occultum, which is the type species for the genus, and Euzetia lamothei, which was described in 2008. E. occultum parasitizes the Australian cownose ray, Rhinoptera neglecta, while E. lamothei parasitizes a different species in the same genus, the cownose ray, Rhinoptera bonasus. Both species inhabit the gills of their respective hosts. The genus is differentiated from other genera based on the morphology of the haptor, and is named for the French parasitologist Louis Euzet.
