= Potamotrygonocotyle eurypotamoxenus =

Scientific classification
- Kingdom: Animalia
- Phylum: Platyhelminthes
- Class: Monogenea
- Order: Monocotylidea
- Family: Monocotylidae
- Genus: Potamotrygonocotyle
- Species: P. eurypotamoxenus

Binomial name
- Potamotrygonocotyle eurypotamoxenus Domingues & Marques, 2007

Species of flatworm

Potamotrygonocotyle eurypotamoxenus is a species of monogenean parasites of stingrays that lives in Brazil.
