= Aetobatus laticeps =

Conservation status
- Vulnerable (IUCN 3.1)

Scientific classification
- Kingdom: Animalia
- Phylum: Chordata
- Class: Chondrichthyes
- Subclass: Elasmobranchii
- Order: Myliobatiformes
- Family: Aetobatidae
- Genus: Aetobatus
- Species: A. laticeps

Binomial name
- Aetobatus laticeps (Gill, 1865)

Species of cartilaginous fish

Aetobatus laticeps, the Pacific white-spotted eagle ray, is a species of cartilaginous fish in the eagle ray family Myliobatidae. It is found in the tropical East Pacific Ocean, ranging from Baja California to northern Peru, including the Galápagos. There has been recent evidence to suggest A.laticeps is in the Mexican tropical Pacific, more specifically in Chacahua Lagoon. However this evidence is insufficient and so the research being done on the spotted eagle rays in Chacahua Lagoon is working under the name A. narinari. Until 2014, it was included in the similar spotted eagle ray (A. narinari), but the two differ in genetics. Studies have been conducted to attempt to identify spot patterns at the individual level. A. laticeps and A. narinari both have white spots on the dorsal side of their dark body, making them difficult to differentiate. Following the split, A. narinari is restricted to the Atlantic, while the Indo-Pacific is inhabited by the closely related A. ocellatus.
