= Aetobatus poeyi =

Aetobatus poeyi Temporal range: ?Eocene

Scientific classification
- Domain: Eukaryota
- Kingdom: Animalia
- Phylum: Chordata
- Class: Chondrichthyes
- Subclass: Elasmobranchii
- Order: Myliobatiformes
- Family: Aetobatidae
- Genus: Aetobatus
- Species: A. poeyi

Binomial name
- Aetobatus poeyi Fernández de Castro, 1873

Extinct species of cartilaginous fish

Aetobatus poeyi is an extinct species of aetobatid eagle ray from Cuba.

== Description ==
The batoid Aetobatus poeyi was described by Fernández de Castro in 1873 from a locality in the lands of Ingenio (sugar mill) Constancia (today Moncada), northwest of the city of Cienfuegos, Cuba. The Eocene age for this species assigned by Fernández de Castro (1873) is questionable. According to Fernández de Castro, the fossil was collected in rocks that crop out in the lower reach of Damují River basin.
