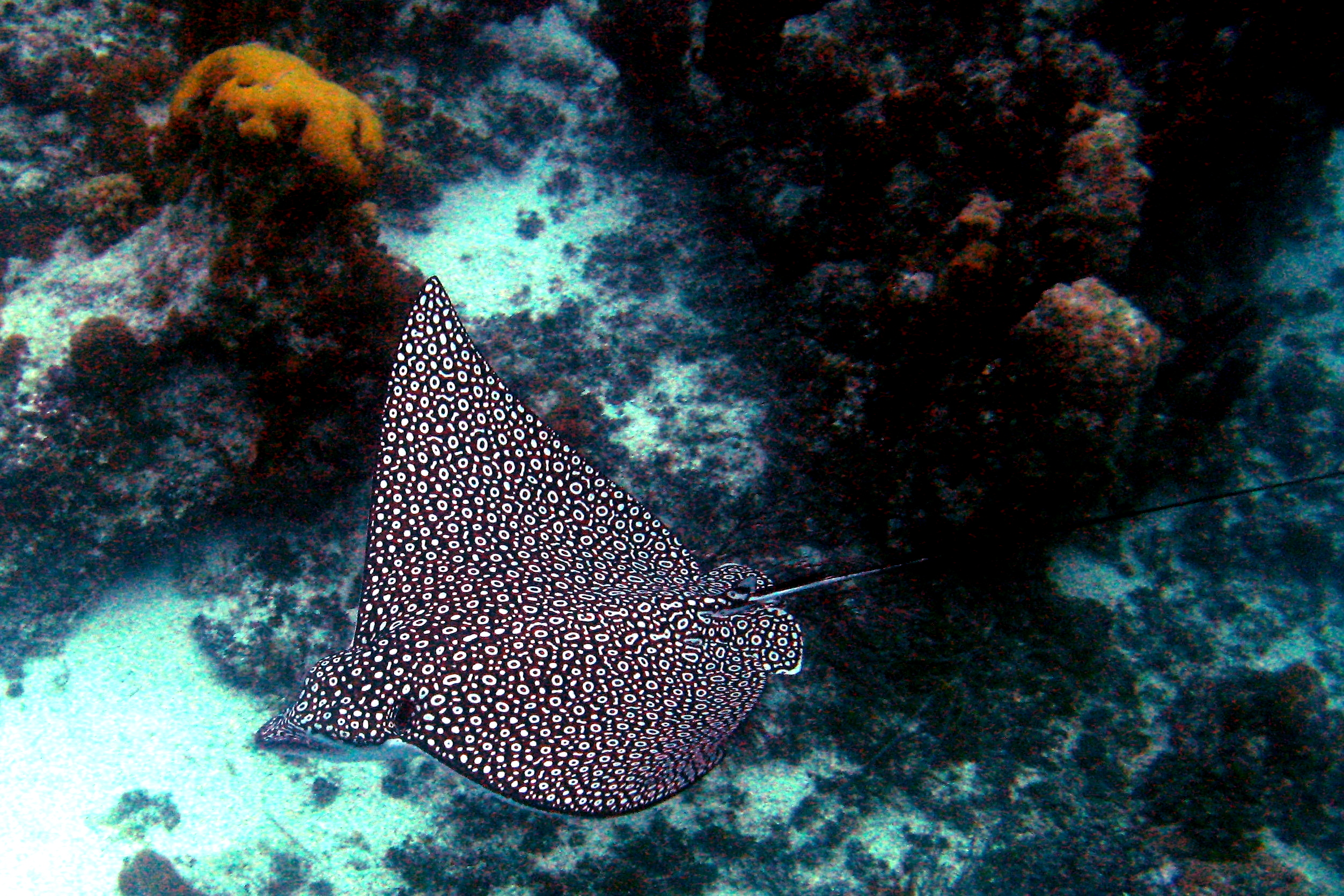
- Spotted eagle ray at Turks and Caicos

Conservation status
- Endangered (IUCN 3.1) (Global)

- Near Threatened (IUCN 3.1)(in central and northern South America)

Scientific classification
- Kingdom: Animalia
- Phylum: Chordata
- Class: Chondrichthyes
- Subclass: Elasmobranchii
- Order: Myliobatiformes
- Family: Aetobatidae
- Genus: Aetobatus
- Species: A. narinari

Binomial name
- Aetobatus narinari (Euphrasén, 1790)
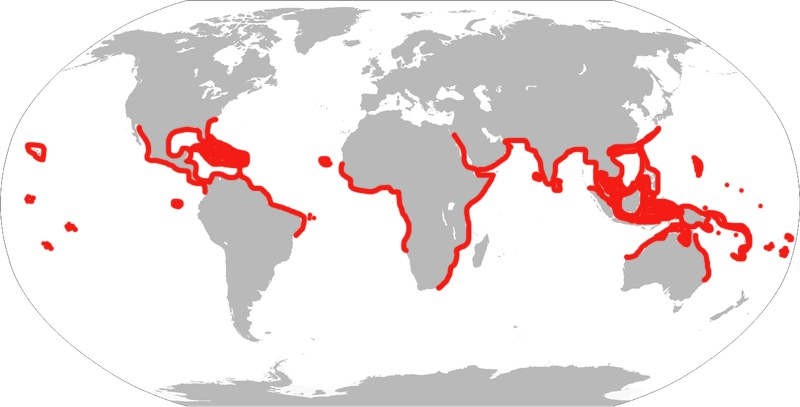
- Range of spotted eagle ray as traditionally recognized, but see text

Synonyms
- Aetobatis latirostris Aetobatis narinari Aetomylus maculatus Myliobatis eeltenkee Myliobatis macroptera Myliobatus punctatus Raia quinqueaculeata Raja narinari Stoasodon narinari

= Spotted eagle ray =

Species of fish

The spotted eagle ray (Aetobatus narinari) is a cartilaginous fish of the eagle ray family, Aetobatidae. As traditionally recognized, it is found globally in tropical regions, including the Atlantic, Pacific, and Indian Oceans. Recent authorities have restricted it to the Atlantic (including the Caribbean and Gulf of Mexico) with other populations recognized as the ocellated eagle ray (A. ocellatus) and Pacific white-spotted eagle ray (A. laticeps). Spotted eagle rays are most commonly seen alone, but occasionally swim in groups. They are ovoviviparous, the female retaining the eggs then releasing the young as miniature versions of the parent.

This ray can be identified by its dark dorsal surface covered in white spots or rings. Near the base of the ray's relatively long tail, just behind the pelvic fins, are several venomous, barbed stingers. Spotted eagle rays commonly feed on small fish, mollusks, and crustaceans, and will sometimes dig with their snouts to look for food buried in the sand of the sea bed. These rays are commonly observed leaping out of the water, and on at least two occasions have been reported as having jumped into boats, in one incident resulting in the death of a woman in the Florida Keys. The spotted eagle ray is hunted by a wide variety of sharks. The rays are considered near threatened on the IUCN Red List. They are fished mainly in Southeast Asia and Africa, the most common market being in commercial trade and aquariums. They are protected in the Great Barrier Reef.

== Taxonomy ==
The spotted eagle ray was first described by Swedish botanist Bengt Anders Euphrasén as Raja narinari in 1790 from a specimen collected at an unknown location (possibly the coast of Brazil) during a trip he made to the Antilles, and was later classified as Stoasodon narinari. Its current genus name is Aetobatus, derived from the Greek words aetos (eagle) and batis (ray). The spotted eagle ray belongs to the Myliobatidae, which includes the well known manta ray. Most rays in the family Myliobatidae swim in the open ocean rather than close to the sea floor.

Although traditionally considered to have a global distribution in tropical oceans throughout the world, recent authorities have restricted the true Aetobatus narinari to the Atlantic Ocean based on genetic and morphologic evidence. The Indo-Pacific population is Aetobatus ocellatus and the East Pacific is Aetobatus laticeps.

The spotted eagle ray has many different common names, including white-spotted eagle ray, bonnet skate, bonnet ray, duckbill ray and spotted duck-billed ray.

== Appearance ==
Spotted eagle rays have flat disk-shaped bodies, deep blue or black with white spots on top with a white underbelly, and distinctive flat snouts similar to a duck's bill. Their tails are longer than those of other rays and may have 2–6 venomous spines behind the pelvic fins. The front of the wing-like pectoral disk has five small gills in its underside.

Mature spotted eagle rays can be up to 5 meters (16 ft) in length; the largest spotted eagle rays have a wingspan of up to 3 meters (10 ft) and a mass of 230 kilograms (507 lb).

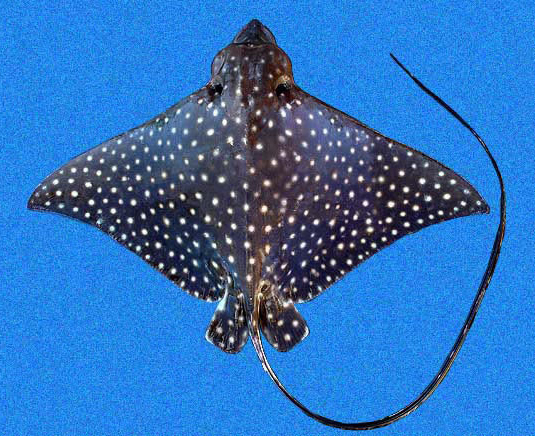
Top view

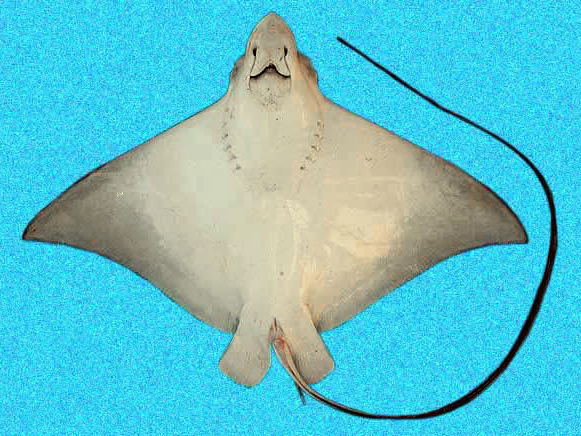
Bottom view

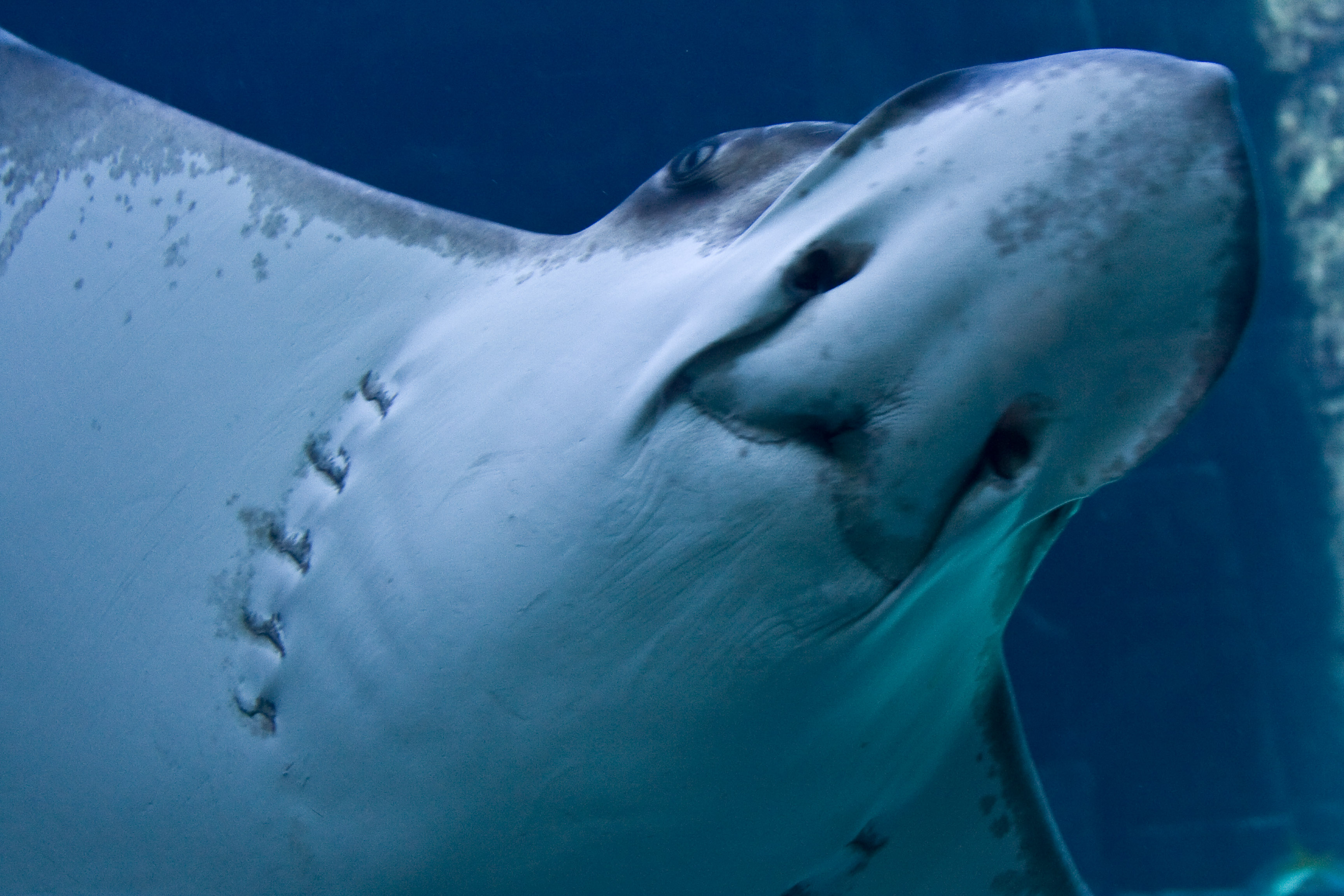
Close up of the head

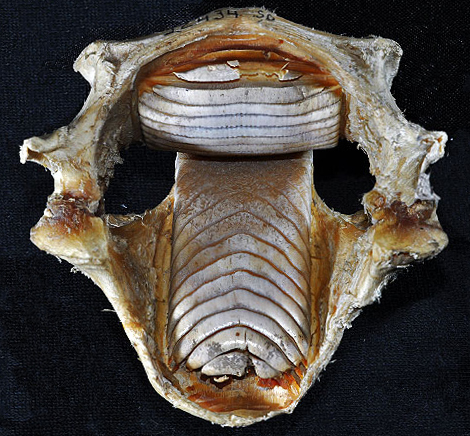
Jaws

=== Reproduction ===
One male, or sometimes several, will pursue a female. When one of the males approaches the female, he uses his upper jaw to grab her dorsum. The male will then roll the female over by grabbing one of her pectoral fins, which are located on either side of her body. Once he is on her ventral side, the male puts a clasper into the female, connecting them venter to venter, with both undersides together. The mating process lasts for 30–90 seconds.

The spotted eagle ray develops ovoviviparously; the eggs are retained in the female and hatch internally, feeding off a yolk sac until live birth. After a gestation period of one year, the mother ray will give birth to a maximum of four pups. When the pups are first born, their discs measure from 17–35 centimeters (6.7–13.8 in) across. The rays mature in 4 to 6 years. Genetic evidence indicates that the spotted eagle ray can undergo consecutive parthenogenesis.

=== Feeding and diet ===
Spotted eagle ray preys mainly upon bivalves, crabs, whelks and other benthic infauna. They also feed on mollusks (such as the queen conch) and other crustaceans, particularly malacostracans, as well as echinoderms, polychaete worms, hermit crabs, shrimp, octopuses, and some small fish.

The spotted eagle ray's specialized chevron-shaped tooth structure helps it to crush the mollusks' hard shells. The jaws of these rays have developed calcified struts to help them break through the shells of mollusks, by supporting the jaws and preventing dents from hard prey. These rays have the unique behavior of digging with their snouts in the sand of the ocean. While doing this, a cloud of sand surrounds the ray and sand spews from its gills. One study has shown that there are no differences in the feeding habits of males and females or in rays from different regions of Australia and Taiwan.

=== Behavior ===
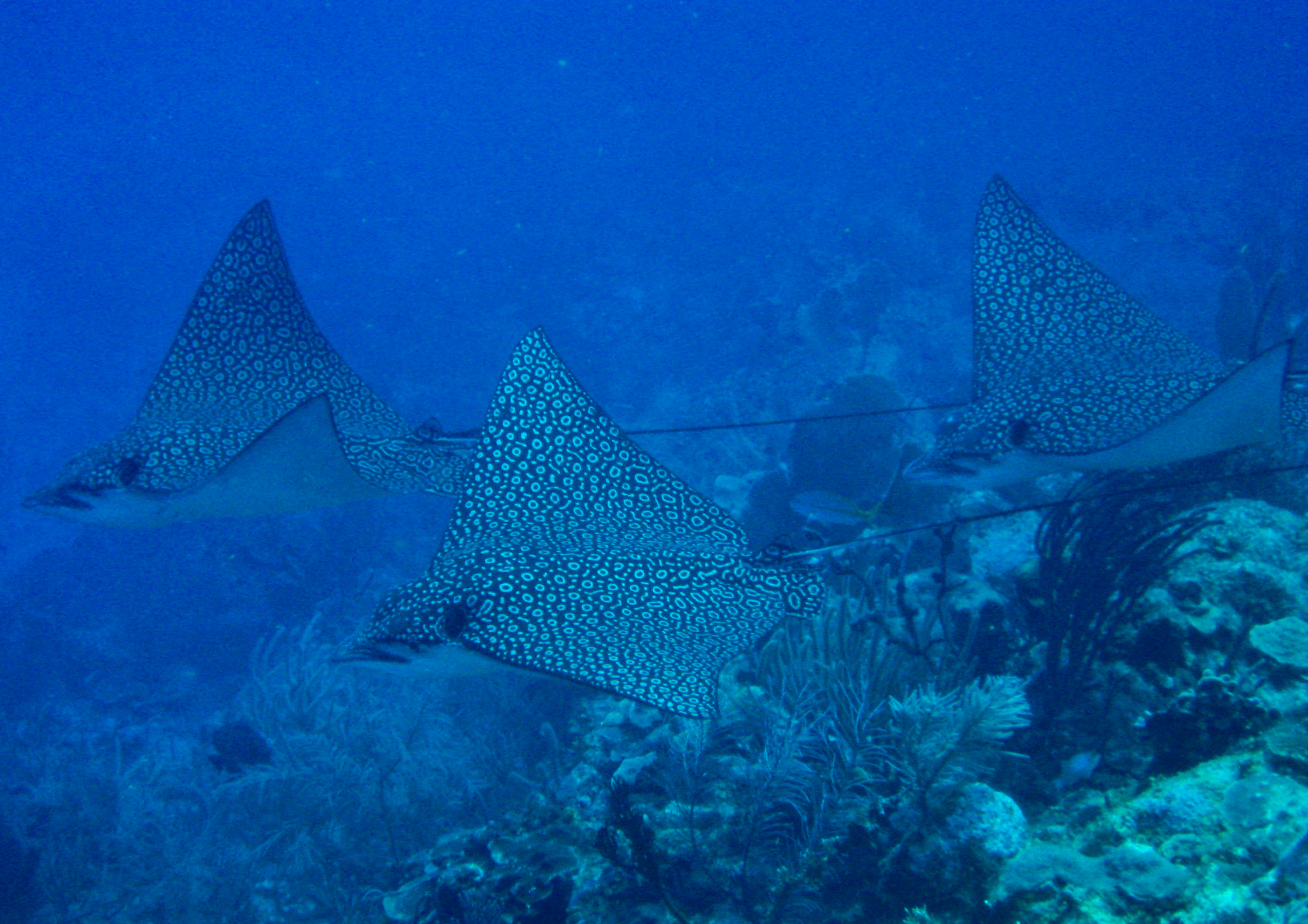
Three individuals off Belize. Spotted eagle rays are social and often occur in groups.

Spotted eagle rays prefer to swim in waters of 24 to 27 °C (75 to 81 °F). Their daily movement is influenced by the tides; one tracking study showed that they are more active during high tides. Uniquely among rays they dig with their snouts in the sand, surrounding themselves in a cloud of sand that spews from their gills. They also exhibit two motions in which the abdomen and the pectoral fins are moved rapidly up and down: the pelvic thrust and the extreme pelvic thrust. The pelvic thrust is usually performed by a solitary ray, and repeated four to five times rapidly. The extreme pelvic thrust is most commonly observed when the ray is swimming in a group, from which it will separate itself before vigorously thrusting with its pectoral fins. The rays also performs dips and jumps; in a dip the ray will dive and then come back up rapidly, perhaps as many as five times consecutively. There are two main types of jump: in one, the ray propels itself vertically out of the water, to which it returns along the same line; the other is when the ray leaps at a 45° angle, often repeated multiple times at high speeds. When in shallow waters or outside their normal swimming areas, the rays are most commonly seen alone, but they do also congregate in schools. One form of travelling is called loose aggregation, which is when 3 to 16 rays are swimming in a loose group, with occasional interactions between them. A school commonly consists of 6 or more rays swimming in the same direction at exactly the same speed.

== Human interaction ==
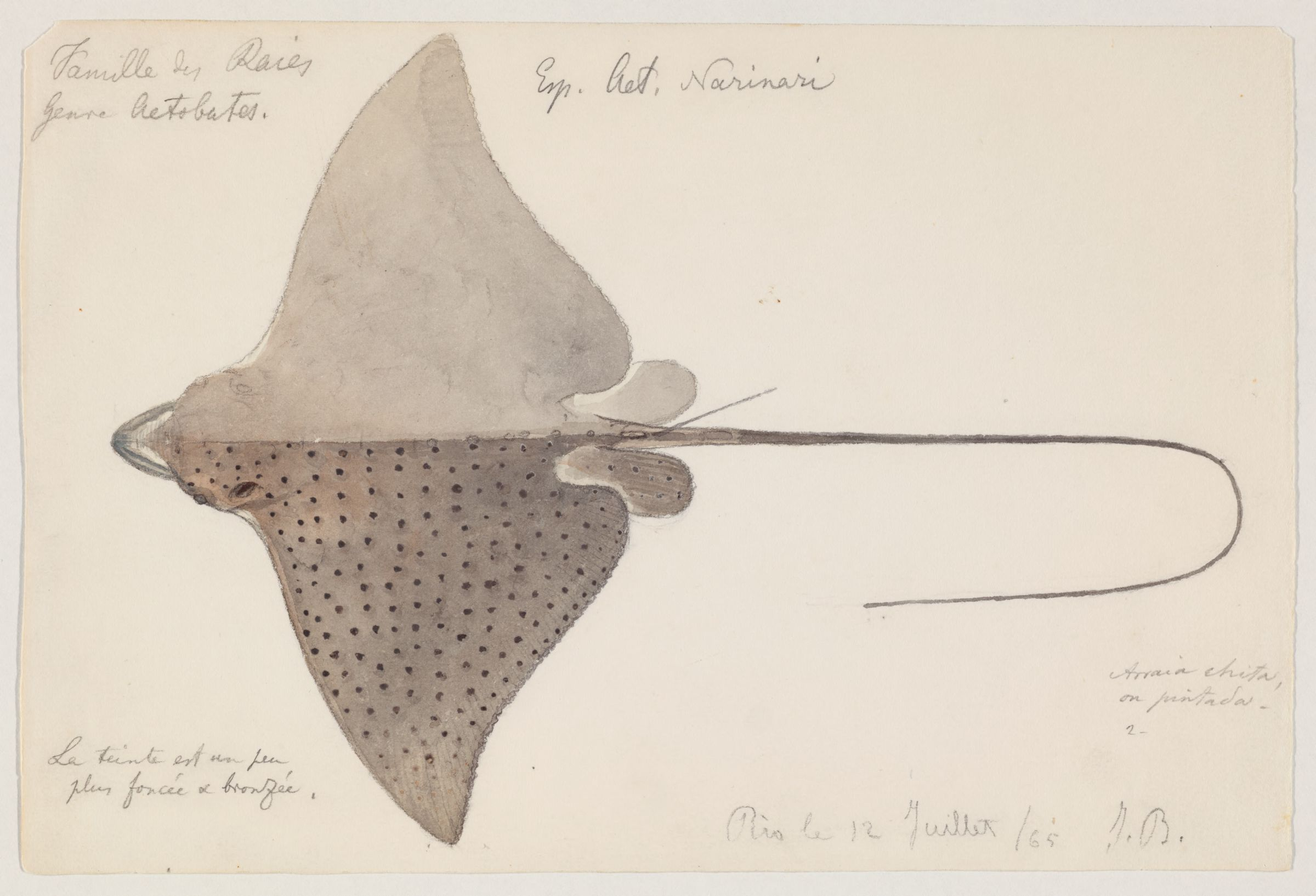
Watercolor of a spotted eagle ray from 1865 by Jacques Burkhardt.

The dorsal spots make the spotted eagle ray an aquarium attraction, although because of its large size it is likely kept only at public aquariums. There are no target fisheries for the spotted eagle ray, but it is often eaten after being caught unintentionally as bycatch. There have been several reported incidents of spotted eagle rays leaping out of the water onto boats and landing on people. Nevertheless, spotted eagle rays do not pose a significant threat to humans, as they are shy and generally avoid human contact. Interactions with an individual snorkeler in the Caribbean has been reported especially in Jamaica involving one, two and even three spotted eagle rays. The rays may exhibit a behavior similar to human curiosity which allows the snorkeler to observe the eagle ray who may slow down so as to share more time with the much slower human observer if the human observer appears to be unthreatening or interesting to the spotted eagle ray.

== Predators and parasites ==
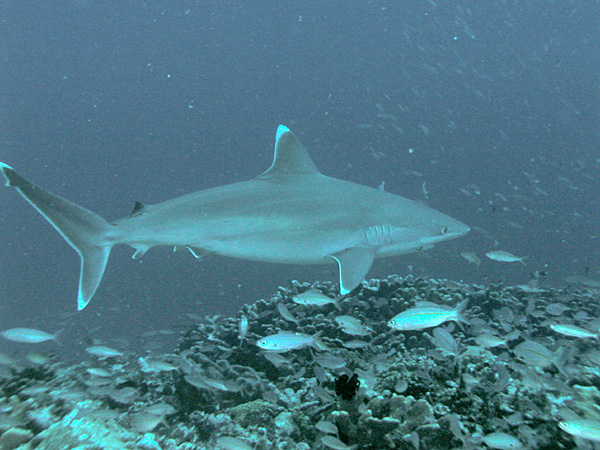
The silvertip shark is a predator of the spotted eagle ray.

Spotted eagle rays, in common with many other rays, often fall victim to sharks such as the tiger shark, the lemon shark, the bull shark, the silver tip shark, and the great hammerhead shark. A great hammerhead shark has been observed attacking a spotted eagle ray in open water by taking a large bite out of one of its pectoral fins, thus incapacitating the ray. The shark then used its head to pin the ray to the bottom and pivoted to take the ray in its jaws, head first. Sharks have also been observed to follow female rays during the birthing season, and feed on the newborn pups.

As other rays, spotted eagle rays are host to a variety of parasites. Internal parasites include the gnathostomatid nematode Echinocephalus sinensis in the spiral intestine. External parasites include the monocotylid monogeneans Decacotyle octona, D. elpora, and Thaumatocotyle pseudodasybatis on the gills.

== Distribution and habitat ==
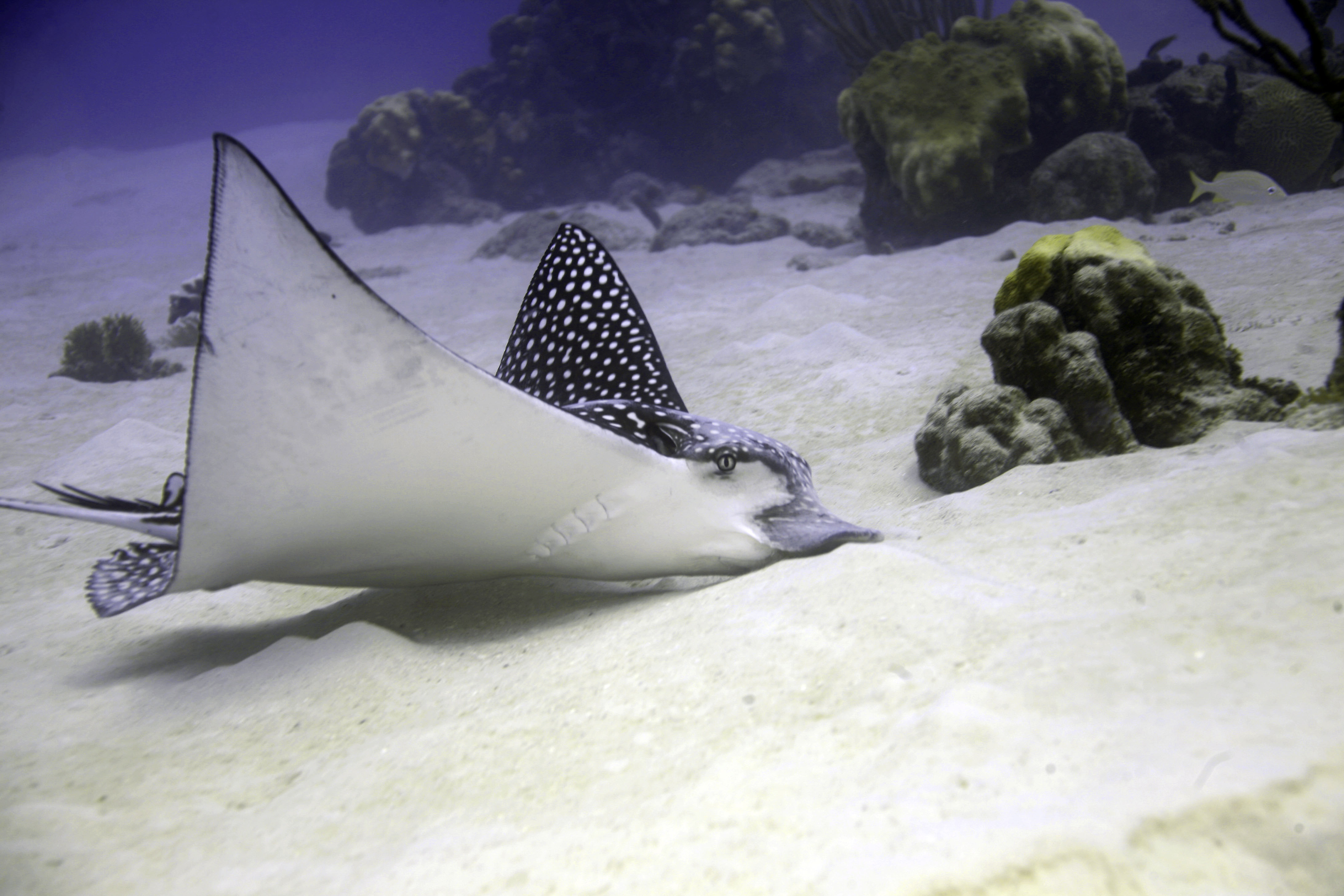
An eagle ray searching the bottom for food at Curaçao

As traditionally defined, spotted eagle rays are found globally in tropical regions from the Indo-Pacific region from the western Pacific Ocean, the Indian Ocean, and the western Atlantic Ocean. They are found in shallow coastal water by coral reefs and bays, in depths down to 80 meters (262 ft).

Spotted eagle rays are found in warm and temperate waters worldwide. In the western Atlantic Ocean it is found off the eastern coast of United States of America, the Gulf Stream, the Caribbean, and down past the southern part of Brazil. In the Indian Ocean, it is found from the Red Sea down to South Africa and eastward to the Andaman Sea. In the Western Pacific Ocean it can be found near Japan and north of Australia. In the Central Pacific Ocean, it can be found throughout the Hawaiian Islands. In the Eastern-Pacific Ocean, it is found in the Gulf of California down through Puerto Pizarro, an area that includes the Galapagos Islands. Spotted eagle rays are most commonly seen in bays and reefs. They spend much of their time swimming freely in open waters, generally in schools close to the surface, and can travel long distances in a day.

Within these regions, there are significant variations in genetics and morphology. As a consequence, recent authorities have split it into three: This restricts the true spotted eagle ray (A. narinari) to the Atlantic, while the Indo-Pacific population is the ocellated eagle ray (A. ocellatus) and the East Pacific is the Pacific white-spotted eagle ray (A. laticeps).

== Conservation ==
The spotted eagle ray is included in the IUCN's Red List as "near threatened". The rays are caught mainly in Southeast Asia and Africa. They are also common in commercial marine life trade and are displayed in aquariums. Among the many efforts to help protect this species, South Africa's decision to deploy fewer protective shark nets has reduced the number of deaths caused by entanglement. South Africa has also placed restrictions on the number of rays that can be bought per person per day. In the U.S. state of Florida, the fishing, landing, purchasing and trading of spotted eagle ray are outlawed. This ray is also protected in the Great Barrier Reef on the eastern coast of Australia.

In Europe there is a breeding program managed by the EAZA for spotted eagle rays to reduce the amount of wild caught individuals needed by public aquaria. From the start until 2018 Burgers' Zoo in the Netherlands kept the studbook. Since 2018, Wroclaw Zoo in Poland is the new studbook keeper. Burgers' Zoo was also the first place in Europe to breed with the species and in 2018 was the most successful breeder worldwide with over 55 births.

== Bibliography ==
- Carpenter, Kent E.; Niem, Volker H. (1999). "Batoid fishes". The Living Marine Resources of the Western Central Pacific. Batoid fishes, chimaeras and bony fishes. Vol. 3. pp. 1511, 1516. ISBN 92-5-104302-7.
- Chapman, D.D.; Gruber, S.H. (May 2002). "A further observation of the prey-handling behavior of the great hammerhead shark, Sphyrna mokarran: predation upon the spotted eagle ray, Aetobatus narinari". Bulletin of Marine Science. 70 (3): 947–952. Archived from the original (PDF) on 31 July 2013.
- Silliman, William R.; Gruber, S.H. (1999). "Behavioral Biology of the Spotted Eagle Ray, Aetobatus narinari (Euphrasen, 1790), in Bimini, Bahamas; an Interim Report". Archived from the original (PDF) on 31 July 2013.
- Tee-Van, John (1953). "Family Myliobatidae, Genus Aetobatus". Fishes of the western North Atlantic, part two. New Haven, Sears Foundation for Marine Research, Yale Univ. pp. 253–263.
