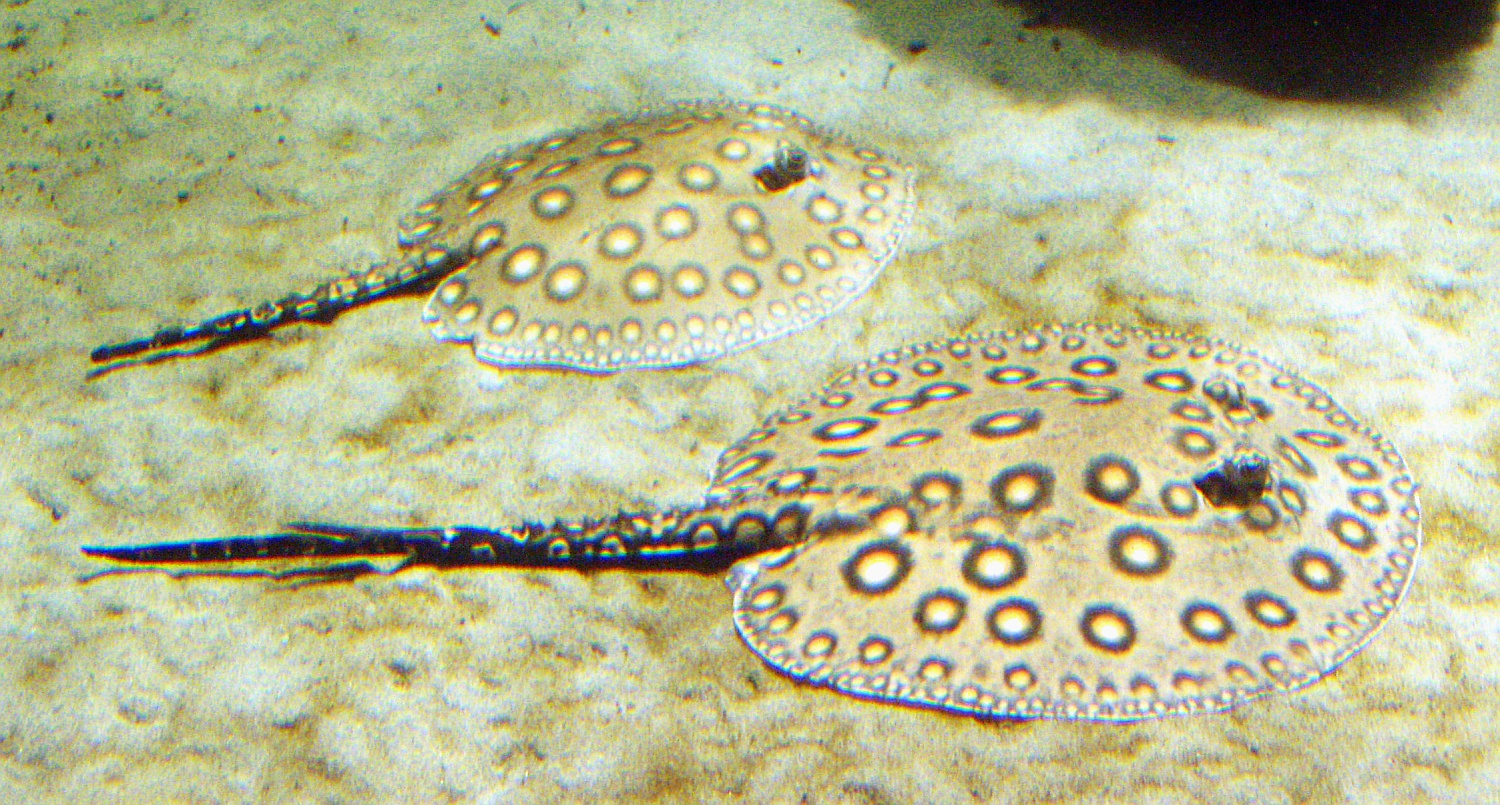
- A pair at the Duisburg Zoo, Germany
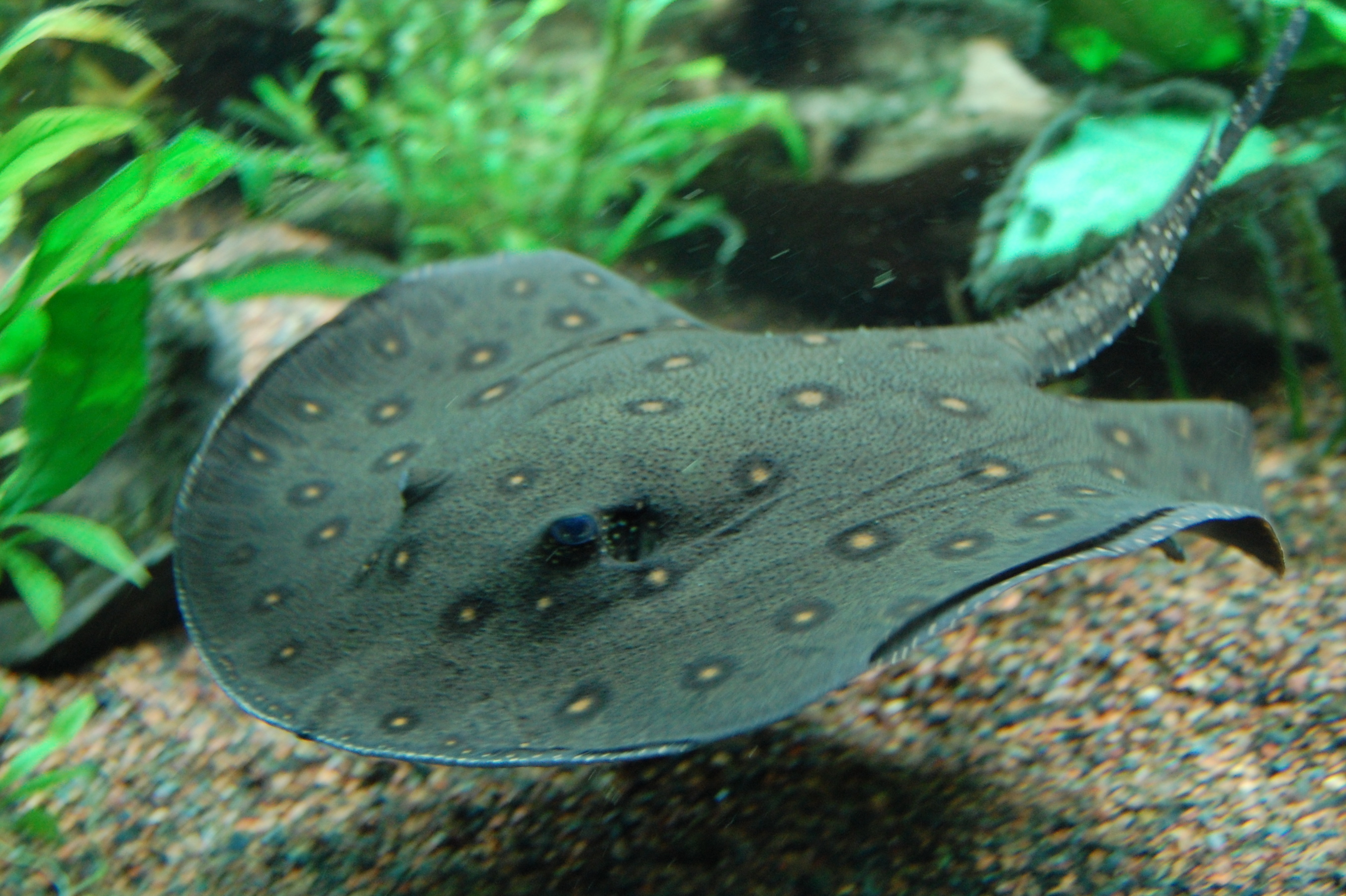
- At the New England Aquarium, Boston

Conservation status
- Least Concern (IUCN 3.1)

Scientific classification
- Kingdom: Animalia
- Phylum: Chordata
- Class: Chondrichthyes
- Subclass: Elasmobranchii
- Order: Myliobatiformes
- Family: Potamotrygonidae
- Genus: Potamotrygon
- Species: P. motoro

Binomial name
- Potamotrygon motoro (J. P. Müller & Henle, 1841)

Synonyms
- Paratrygon laticeps Garman 1913; Potamotrygon alba Castex 1963; Potamotrygon circularis Garman 1913; Potamotrygon labradori Castex 1963; Potamotrygon laticeps Garman 1913; Potamotrygon pauckei Castex 1963; Taeniura motoro Müller & Henle 1841; Trygon garrapa Jardine 1843; Trygon mulleri Castelnau 1855

= Ocellate river stingray =

Species of cartilaginous fish

The ocellate river stingray (Potamotrygon motoro), also known as the peacock-eye stingray or black river stingray, is a species of freshwater stingray in the family Potamotrygonidae. It was the first species to be described in the family and is also the most widespread, ranging throughout much of the Río de la Plata, Amazon, Mearim and Orinoco basins in tropical and subtropical South America. It is sometimes kept in aquaria.

== Taxonomy ==
Potamotrygon motoro varies significantly in appearance and morphology over its large range, and a taxonomic review of the Amazonian populations is expected. The taxonomy of the populations in the Río de la Plata Basin was reviewed in 2013, leading to the finding that P. motoro is found virtually throughout (absent from the Paraná Basin upriver from Itaipu Dam), but also that there are two additional members of this species complex: P. amandae (widespread in Río de la Plata Basin) and P. pantanensis (northern Pantanal). Two highly distinctive Amazonian types completely lack black-edged yellow-orange spots: The so-called "mantilla ray", CD4, in Peru and adjacent parts of Brazil, and the similar but paler CD5 from rivers near Marajó. Both CD4 and CD5 co-occur with normal variants of P. motoro. In 2019, they were described as a new species, P marquesi.

Currently recognized members of the species complex found elsewhere are P. boesemani (Corantijn River; P. motoro absent), P. jabuti (mid and upper Tapajós Basin; P. motoro in the lower), and P. ocellata (lower Amazon Basin), but the last may be a synonym of P. motoro.

== Appearance ==
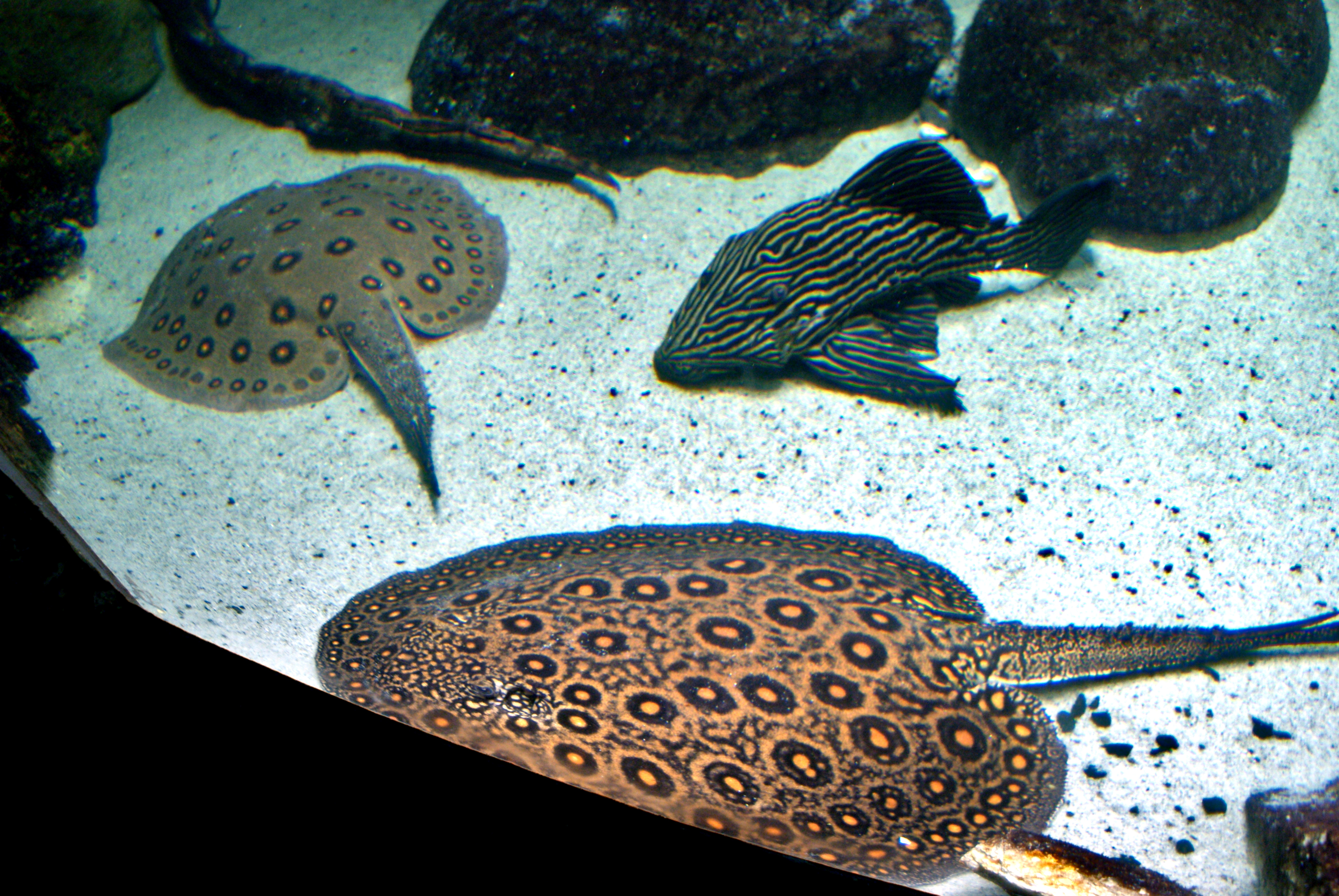
Two variants of P. motoro, the nearest being a "marbled" type, alongside royal panaque.

Potamotrygon motoro can grow up to 50 cm (1.6 ft) in disc width, 1 m (3.3 ft) in total length, and 34.2 kilograms (75 lb 6 oz) in weight. (though the official IGFA record is only 12.59 kg (27 lb 12 oz)) Its disk is roughly circular in shape, and its eyes are raised from the dorsal surface. The dorsal coloration is typically beige or brown, with numerous yellow-orange spots with dark rings. Its exact color, and the arrangement and size of the spots can vary significantly, both from individual to individual and depending on location. Three primary types have been identified in the Amazon basin, but each of these include a number of subtypes (two additional main types now are considered a separate species, P. marquesi). The two main Amazonian types, informally known as CD1 and CD2, are found throughout much of the Amazon (except most of the Rio Negro basin) and they often occur together. Those from the Río de la Plata Basin and Mearim River resemble CD1. Individuals from the Rio Negro and Orinoco basins (which are connected by the Casiquiare canal) are similar to each other and informally known as CD3, but differ from P. motoro elsewhere. Some individuals of CD3 have spots near the rim of the disc that are connected, forming a chain-like pattern. However, the "marbled" type is generally only reported from the Orinoco basin, including the Ventuari River.

== In aquaria ==
Ocellate river stingrays are sometimes kept in captivity, with requirements similar to other members of Potamotrygon. It is one of the most popular species of freshwater stingrays, but requires a very large tank. This species breeds readily in captivity and give birth to live pups.
