= Septesinus =

Scientific classification
- Kingdom: Animalia
- Phylum: Platyhelminthes
- Class: Monogenea
- Order: Monocotylidea
- Family: Monocotylidae
- Genus: Septesinus; Chisholm, 2013
- Species: S. gibsoni

Binomial name
- Septesinus gibsoni Chisholm, 2013

Genus of flatworms

Septesinus is a genus of monopisthocotylean monogeneans which currently comprises a single species, Septesinus gibsoni

== Etymology ==
The generic name is derived from the Latin septem ("seven") and sinus ("cavity"), in reference to the seven peripheral loci of the haptor. The specific epithet was given in honor of Dr. David Gibson "in recognition of his many years of outstanding service to Systematic Parasitology and for his ongoing support to the authors publishing in this journal."
