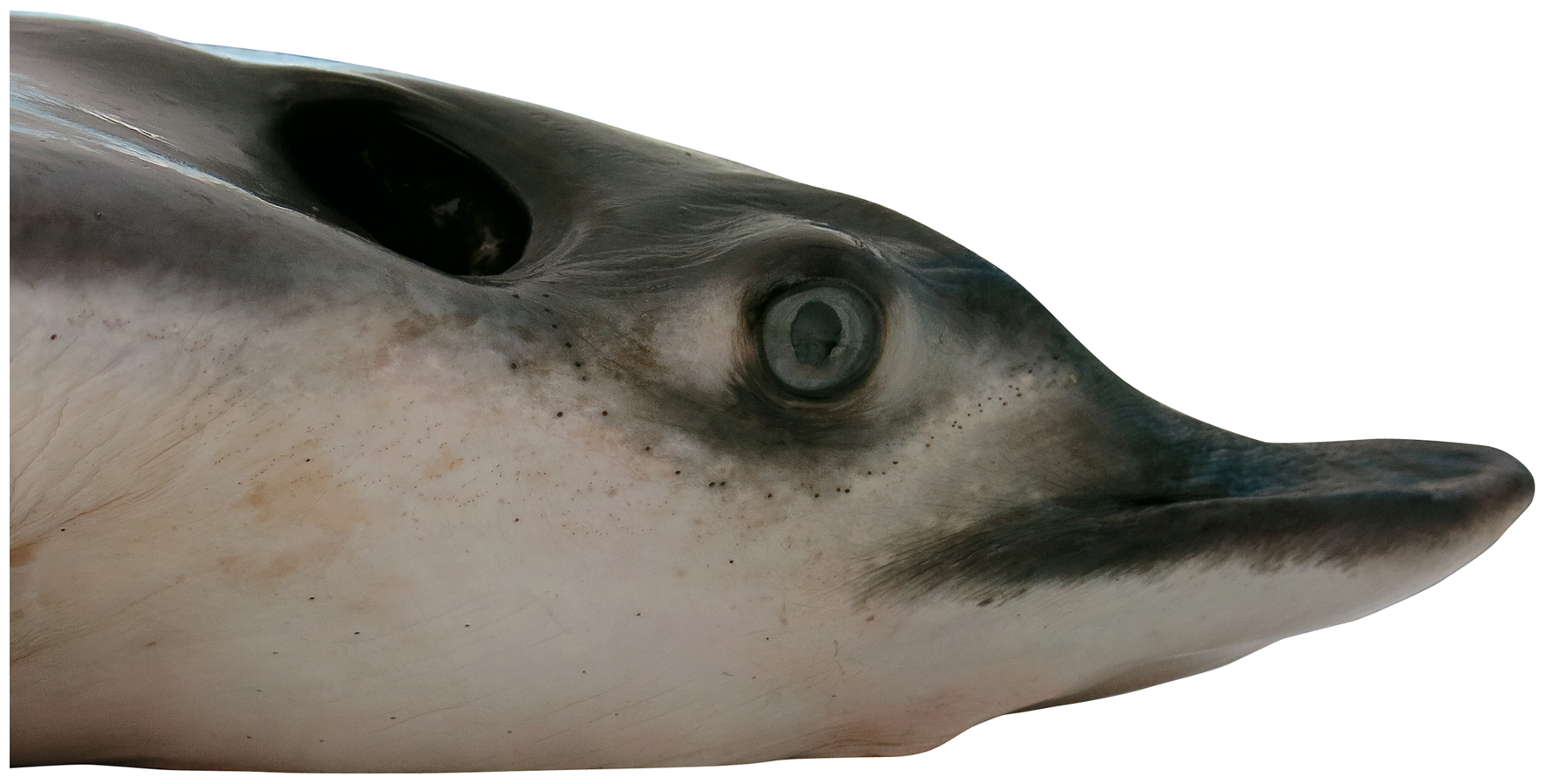

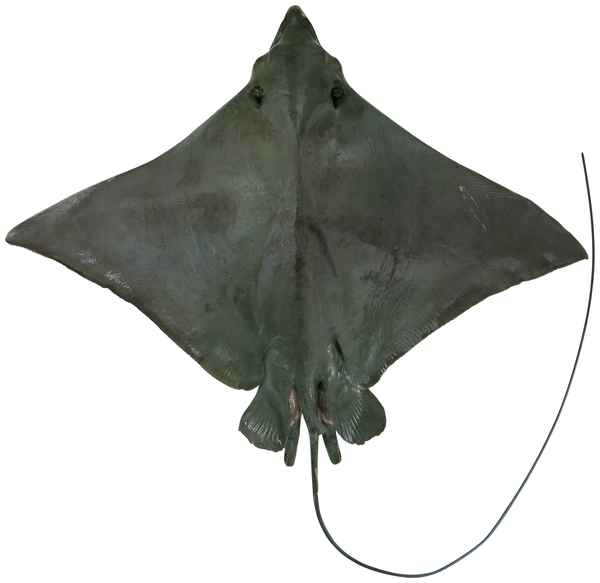

Conservation status
- Vulnerable (IUCN 3.1)

Scientific classification
- Kingdom: Animalia
- Phylum: Chordata
- Class: Chondrichthyes
- Subclass: Elasmobranchii
- Order: Myliobatiformes
- Family: Aetobatidae
- Genus: Aetobatus
- Species: A. narutobiei

Binomial name
- Aetobatus narutobiei White, Yamaguchi, and Furumitsu, 2013

= Aetobatus narutobiei =

Species of cartilaginous fish

Aetobatus narutobiei, the Naru eagle ray, is a species of cartilaginous fish of the eagle ray family, Myliobatidae. It is found in the northwest Pacific off south Japan, South Korea, China, Hong Kong and Vietnam. It occurs from shallow, coastal flats to a depth of 59 m (194 ft), but always in water warmer than 15 °C (59 °F).

Until 2013, this species was included in the longheaded eagle ray (Aetobatus flagellum), but the two differ in genetics, morphology, size and range (the smaller longhead eagle ray is from the Indian Ocean). The Naru eagle ray is up to 1.5 m (4.9 ft) in width and its upperparts are uniformly greenish grey to brownish. Although little information exists for this species throughout most of its range, the life history and ecology has been reasonably well studied in Japanese waters. In the Ariake Bay region of Kyushu Island where it is numerous, it is considered a pest that preys on commercially valuable farmed bivalves and large numbers are culled every year. Findings from recent studies show that females take around twice the time to reach full maturity compared to that of a male Naru eagle ray. The prenatal period of the female eagle ray lasts for 12 months with diapause lasting from a wide range of 4 to 10 months. This makes them an easy target for overfishing.
