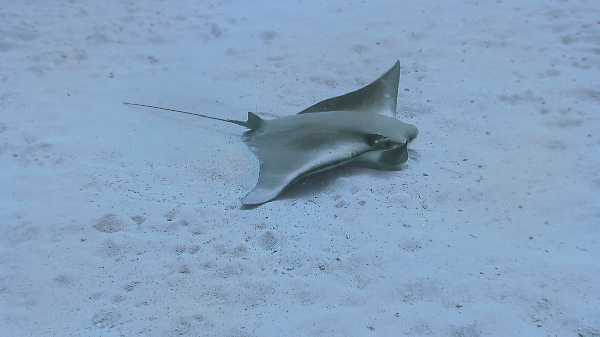

Conservation status
- Critically Endangered (IUCN 3.1)

Scientific classification
- Kingdom: Animalia
- Phylum: Chordata
- Class: Chondrichthyes
- Subclass: Elasmobranchii
- Order: Myliobatiformes
- Family: Rhinopteridae
- Genus: Rhinoptera
- Species: R. marginata

Binomial name
- Rhinoptera marginata (Saint-Hilaire, 1817)

= Rhinoptera marginata =

Species of eagle ray

Rhinoptera marginata, the Lusitanian cownose ray, is a species of ray found along the western coast of Africa and Mediterranean Sea. It is apparently rare in the Mediterranean Sea, but is common in shallow waters off the western Africa.

In February 2024, the species was added to the appendices of the Convention on the Conservation of Migratory Species of Wild Animals, with the species added to Appendix II, and the Mediterranean Sea population of the same species added to Appendix I.

== Description ==
Its maximum width is 2 m (6.6 ft).

== Distribution ==
It is found in the eastern Atlantic from Portugal to the Central African coast and in the eastern part of the Mediterranean Sea.

== Life cycle ==
They exhibit ovoviviparity (aplacental viviparity), with embryos feeding initially on yolk, then receiving additional nourishment from the mother by indirect absorption of uterine fluid enriched with mucus, fat or protein through specialised structures. They are supposedly k-selective, meaning they produce offspring once or so yearly, which is not a good thing for this heavily hunted animal.
