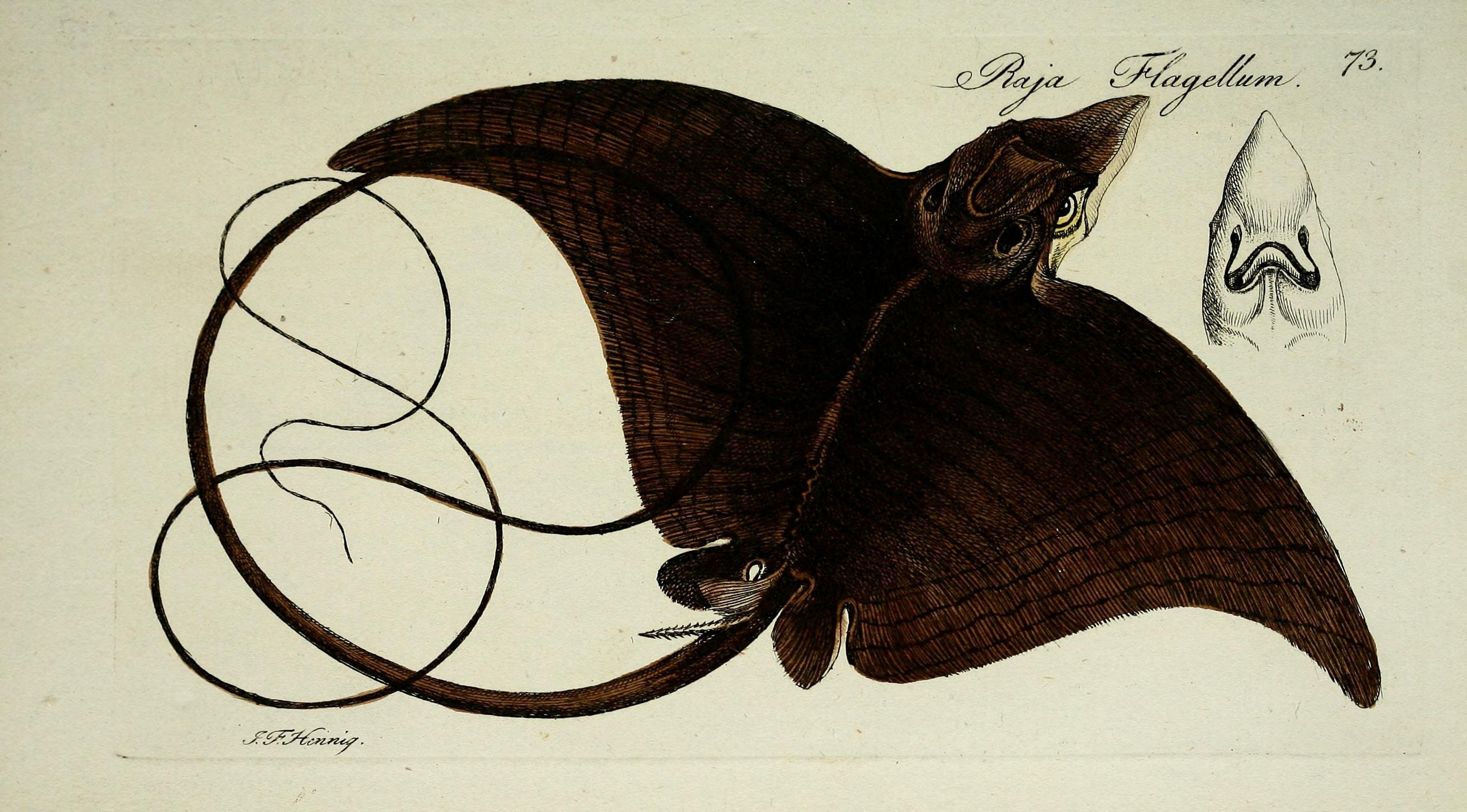

Conservation status
- Endangered (IUCN 3.1)

Scientific classification
- Kingdom: Animalia
- Phylum: Chordata
- Class: Chondrichthyes
- Subclass: Elasmobranchii
- Order: Myliobatiformes
- Family: Aetobatidae
- Genus: Aetobatus
- Species: A. flagellum

Binomial name
- Aetobatus flagellum (Bloch & J. G. Schneider, 1801)

Synonyms
- Raja flagellum Bloch & Schneider, 1801

= Longheaded eagle ray =

Species of cartilaginous fish

The longheaded eagle ray (Aetobatus flagellum) is a species of eagle ray in the family Myliobatidae. The longheaded eagle ray, like other members of the genus Aetobatus, is characteristically different from other genera of eagle rays, distinguished by their notched nasal curtain; complete, singular set of upper and lower teeth; and v-shaped teeth in the lower jaw. It is found in the tropical and warm temperate Indo-West Pacific. It formerly included populations in the northwest Pacific, but these were recognized as a separate species, Aetobatus narutobiei, in 2013. Longheaded eagle rays are benthopelagic fishes that feed on crustaceans, cephalopods, echinoderms, and small bony fishes. It is a poorly known species, but generally uncommon and considered endangered by the IUCN.

== Description ==
Longheaded eagle rays have a prominent cephalic fin attached to the snout, projecting up and away from the head. Eyes are located laterally on the dorsal side of the head. Spiracles are located posterior to the eyes. Pectoral fins are separate from, and posterior to the head. Longheaded eagle rays have a diamond-shaped disc with relatively large, narrowly triangular pectoral fins that round near the rear tips. The dorsal fin is located between the pectoral fins. The longheaded eagle ray lacks a caudal fin. The tail of the longheaded eagle ray is one of their distinguishing features, measuring up to three times their body length, tapering from base to spine.

=== Color ===
Longheaded eagle rays are unique in the genus Aetobatus in that they have no spotted coloration on their dorsal plane. The dorsal side of their disc is uniformly greenish-brown, with no apparent spotting. The ventral side of the disc is primarily white with green-brown mottling along the perimeter of the disc. Eyes are blueish-black in color.

=== Size ===
The disc width (DW) of male longheaded eagle rays range in size from 233 to 543 millimeters. Females have a disc width of approximately 243-578 millimeters. The smallest free-swimming specimen observed was 233 mm. In Northeast India, two specimens measuring 790 and 830 mm DW were recorded. A specimen collected in North Kuwait measured 900 mm DW.

== Distribution and habitat ==
=== Range ===
Longheaded eagle rays have been observed in the tropical and warm temperate Indo-West Pacific, including the Western and Eastern Indian Ocean, Western Central and Northwest Pacific Ocean, the Red Sea, and the Japan Sea. They are native to China, India, Indonesian, Pakistan, and Japan.

=== Habitat ===
The longheaded eagle ray inhabits coastal shallow waters on the interior continental shelf. They typically inhabit brackish waters and tropical and subtropical estuarine environments. Longheaded eagle rays are benthopelagic, meaning they live and feed near or on the ocean floor. They consume crustaceans, cephalopods, echinoderms, and small bony fish. Using their shovel-shaped snout, they can excavate mud and sand when hunting for benthic invertebrates. Their dentition and papillae allow them to crush prey and separate shell from flesh before consumption.

== Threats ==
Due to the over-exploitation of other fish and marine organisms in coastal habitats, longheaded eagle rays are classified as endangered on the IUCN red list. Commercial fisheries that net and trawl in these habitats will often inadvertently catch longheaded eagle rays but will seldom release them back into their environment. By-catch will often be discarded or sold at local fish markets. Additionally, because longheaded eagle rays are so common in estuarine habitats, they are particularly susceptible to the anthropogenic pollutants - toxic chemicals, heavy metals, and pathogens - that accumulate there as a result of discarded by-products of civilization. Estuaries are also subject to large-scale construction activities like damming, dredging, filling, and draining, resulting in direct and immediate habitat loss. Another reason the longheaded eagle ray is a concern to conservationist in their low fecundity. Similar to other Myliobatid rays, longheaded eagle rays produce small litters, ranging from 1-4 pups, which typically reach sexual maturity at 4–6 years old.
