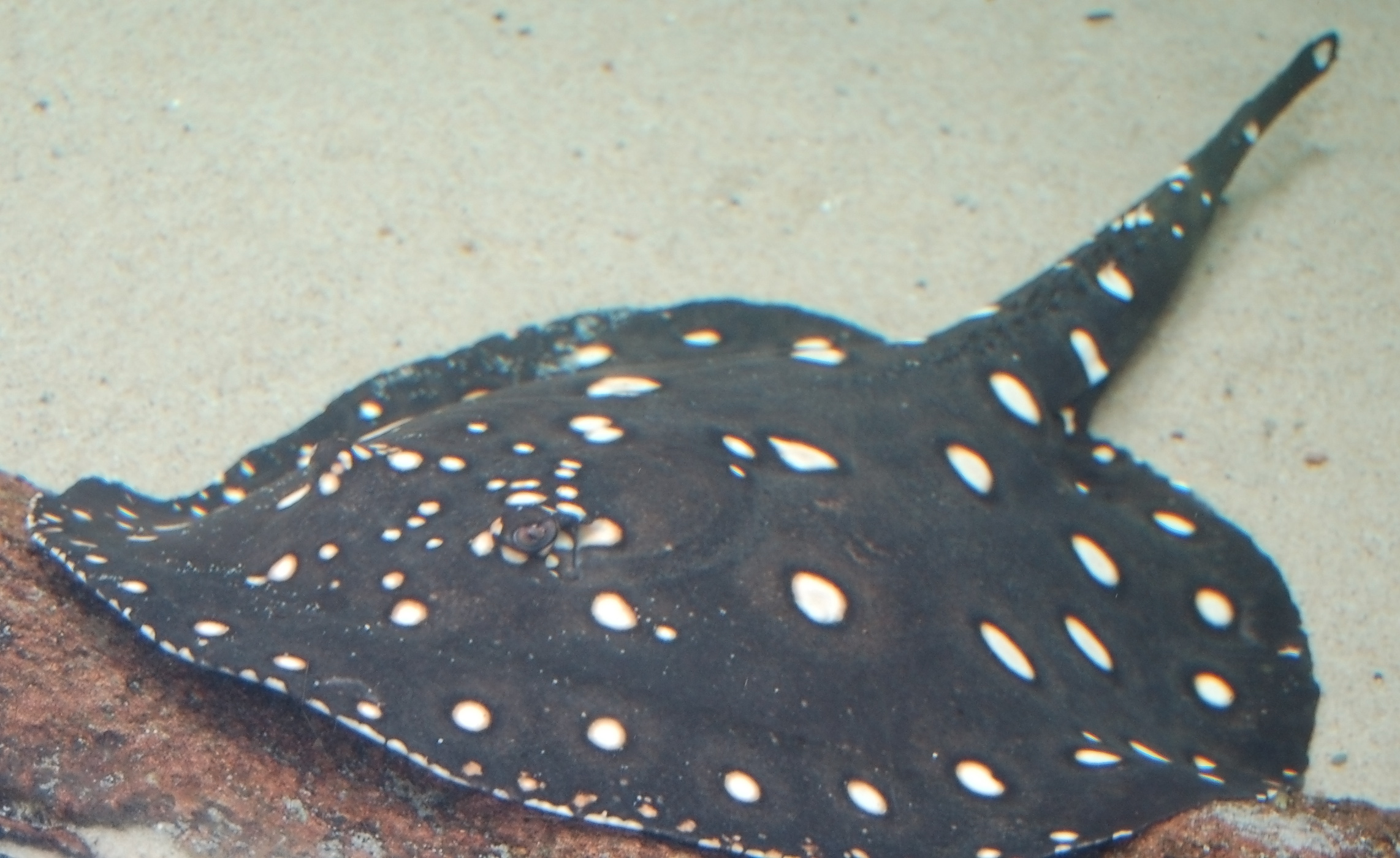

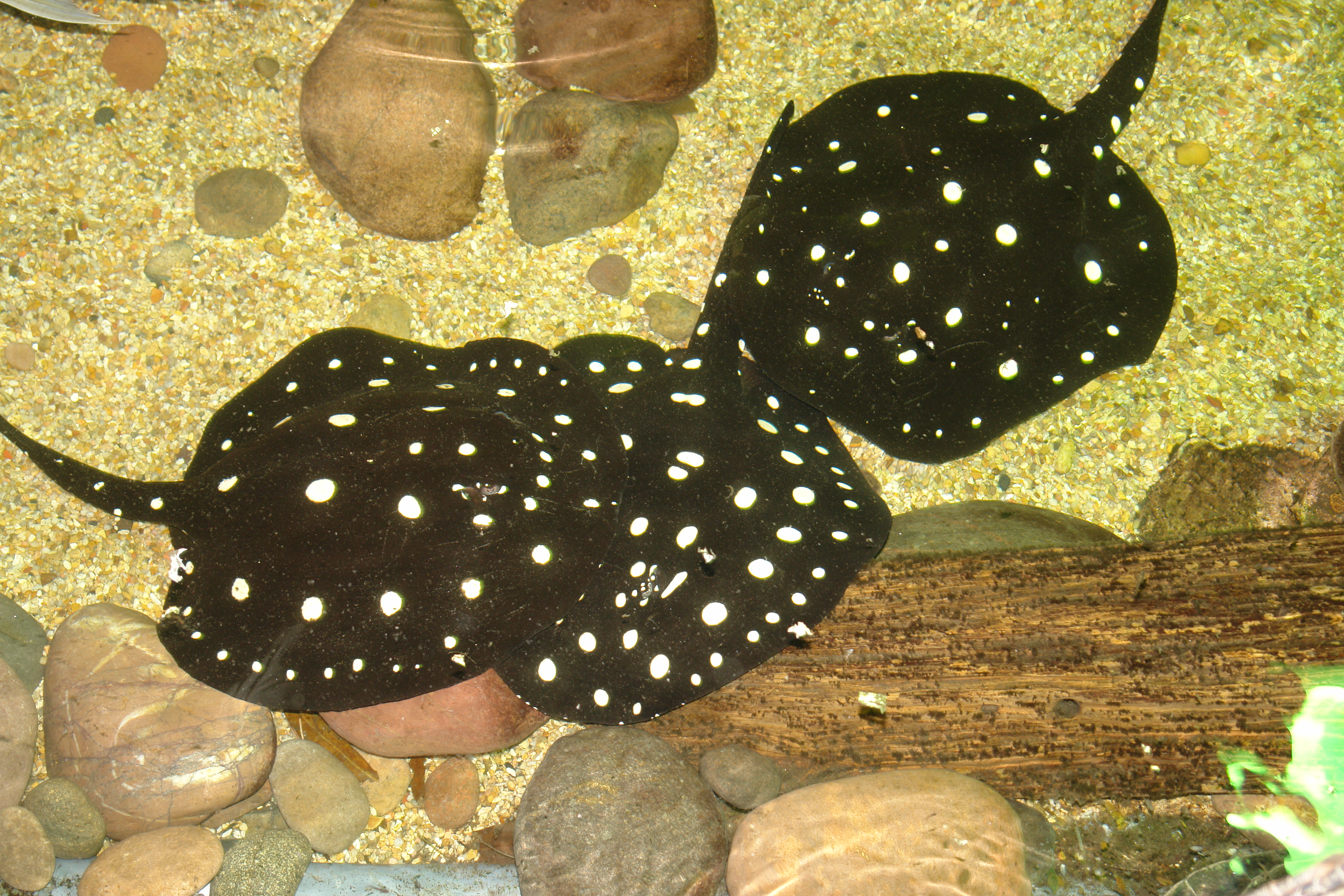

Conservation status
- Vulnerable (IUCN 3.1)
- CITES Appendix II (CITES)

Scientific classification
- Kingdom: Animalia
- Phylum: Chordata
- Class: Chondrichthyes
- Subclass: Elasmobranchii
- Order: Myliobatiformes
- Family: Potamotrygonidae
- Genus: Potamotrygon
- Species: P. leopoldi

Binomial name
- Potamotrygon leopoldi Castex & Castello, 1970

= Xingu River ray =

Species of cartilaginous fish

The Xingu River ray, River stingray, white-blotched river stingray, or polka-dot stingray (Potamotrygon leopoldi) is a species of freshwater fish in the family Potamotrygonidae. It is endemic to the Xingu River basin in Brazil and as such prefers clear waters with rocky bottoms. It is sometimes kept in aquaria, like its more common relative the Motoro.

== Etymology ==
The fish is named in honor of King Leopold III (1901–1983) of Belgium, who sponsored many scientific studies at the Institut Royal des Sciences Naturelles de Belgique.

== Description ==
Potamotrygon leopoldi in the wild

Potamotrygon leopoldi reaches up to 40 cm (16 in) in disc width, 75 cm (30 in) in total length and 20 kg (44 lb) in weight. Females grow larger than males. It is closely related to the similar P. henlei from the Tocantins River basin and P. albimaculata from the Tapajós River basin. Compared to P. henlei, P. leopoldi is deeper black above and its underparts are mostly brownish-dusky (large white center to underparts of P. henlei). Compared to P. albimaculata, P. leopoldi has fewer and larger yellowish-white spots above.

The River stingray is a venomous stingray that contains venom localized at its dentine spine in its tail. While the ray's venom composition does not change with maturation, the venom toxicity decreases as rays get older. On the other hand, rays' jaw shape, stiffness, and mineralization are strengthened with age, which allows mature rays the ability to consume hard-shelled invertebrates. These changes in traits with maturation reflect the different pressures rays experience in terms of functions such as feeding and avoiding predation during different maturity stages.
