= Potamotrygon marinae =

Conservation status
- Near Threatened (IUCN 3.1)

Scientific classification
- Kingdom: Animalia
- Phylum: Chordata
- Class: Chondrichthyes
- Subclass: Elasmobranchii
- Order: Myliobatiformes
- Family: Potamotrygonidae
- Genus: Potamotrygon
- Species: P. marinae

Binomial name
- Potamotrygon marinae Deynat, 2006

Species of fish

Potamotrygon marinae, the French guiana freshwater stingray or gold dust stingray, is a type of freshwater tropical ray found exclusively in Suriname and French Guiana.

== Description ==
Little is known of its biology. It is believed to reach a maximum size of 42 cm (17 in) disc width (DW), with mature male specimens usually reach 24 cm (9.4 in) DW and mature female specimens reach 30 cm (12 in) DW in average.

== Habitat & distribution ==
This stingray is endemic to the rivers of Guiana Shield in Suriname and French Guiana. Two direct major threats to this species are exploitation for international exotic fish market and habitat degradation resulted of nearby river mining activities.
