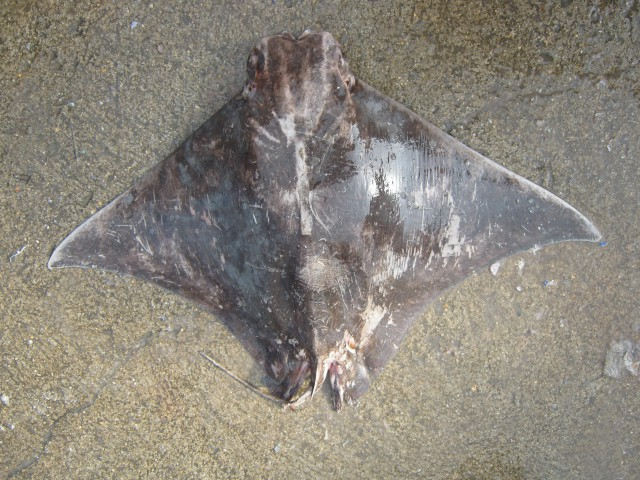

Conservation status
- Endangered (IUCN 3.1)

Scientific classification
- Kingdom: Animalia
- Phylum: Chordata
- Class: Chondrichthyes
- Subclass: Elasmobranchii
- Order: Myliobatiformes
- Family: Rhinopteridae
- Genus: Rhinoptera
- Species: R. javanica

Binomial name
- Rhinoptera javanica J. P. Müller & Henle, 1841

= Flapnose ray =

Species of fish

The flapnose ray or Javanese cownose ray (Rhinoptera javanica) is a species of fish in the family Rhinopteridae. It is found in the Indo-Pacific off China, India, Indonesia, Iran, Japan, Madagascar, Malaysia, Mozambique, Pakistan, the Philippines, Seychelles, Somalia, South Africa, Sri Lanka, Taiwan, Tanzania, Thailand, Vietnam and possibly Australia. Its natural habitats are open seas, shallow seas, subtidal aquatic beds, coral reefs, estuarine waters, and coastal saline lagoons.

== Conservation ==
The Javanese cownose ray's population has undergone alarming declines throughout its range. In various regions, substantial population reductions have been observed, ranging from 50% to 79% over the last three generation lengths (44 years). High exploitation levels and significant declines in elasmobranchs, rays, and whiprays indicate a dire situation. Overfishing, particularly in Chinese and Vietnamese waters, has raised concerns about the species' survival.

== Threats ==
=== Fishing pressures and overexploitation ===
The Javanese cownose ray faces extensive fishing pressures, with both targeted and bycatch capture, across the entirety of its range. These pressures originate from various fishing methods, including demersal trawl, purse seines, tangle nets, set nets, gill nets, droplines, longlines, and Danish seine. The rays are often retained for human consumption or processed into fishmeal.

=== Decline in fish stocks and overfishing ===
In specific regions like the northern South China Sea, intense overfishing has led to a drastic decline in fish stocks over the years. The use of modern fishing gear, the increase in the number of fishing vessels, and changes in catch composition have added to this problem. With the demand for seafood on the rise, particularly in countries like China, the pressures on fish stocks are growing.

=== Illegal, unreported, and unregulated (IUU) fishing ===
Illegal, unreported, and unregulated (IUU) fishing is a pervasive issue in the Indo-Pacific region. Reported catch figures often represent only a fraction of the actual catch, exacerbating the problem of overfishing and depletion of shark and ray populations. Some marine protected areas (MPAs) are also affected by high levels of IUU fishing.
