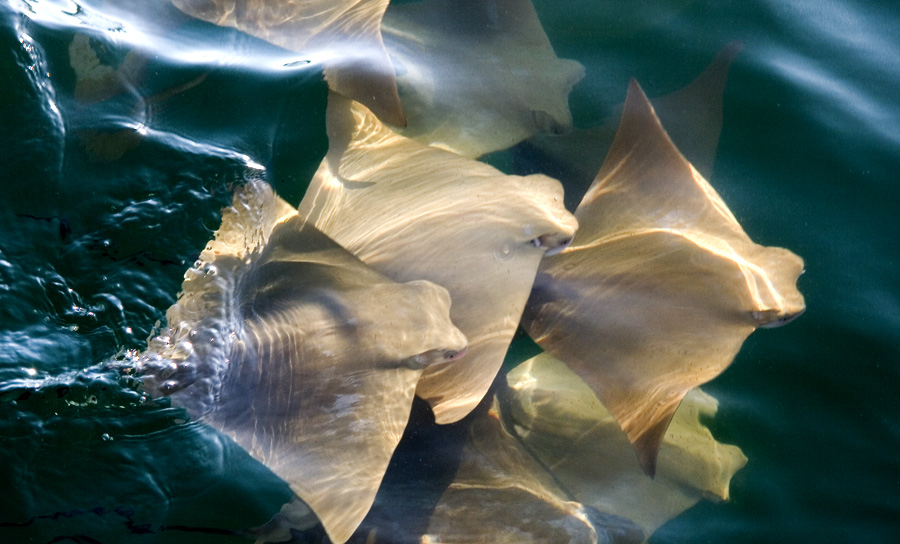
- Rhinoptera steindachneri

Scientific classification
- Kingdom: Animalia
- Phylum: Chordata
- Class: Chondrichthyes
- Subclass: Elasmobranchii
- Division: Batomorphi
- Order: Myliobatiformes
- Family: Rhinopteridae; D. S. Jordan & Evermann, 1896
- Genus: Rhinoptera van Hasselt, 1824

Type species
- Myliobatis marginata Geoffroy St. Hilaire, 1817

= Rhinoptera =

Rhinoptera Temporal range: Thanetian–recent

Genus of cartilaginous fishes

Rhinoptera is a genus of ray commonly known as the cownose rays. This genus is the only member of the family Rhinopteridae.

These rays feed on mollusks and various other benthic prey.

Their low fecundity rate and late maturity makes them susceptible to overfishing. All species of this genus are included in the IUCN Red List of Threatened species.

== Species ==
There are currently 7 recognized extant (living) species in this genus:

Image	Scientific name	Distribution
	Rhinoptera bonasus (Mitchill, 1815) (cownose ray)	western Atlantic and Caribbean, from New England to southern Brazil
	Rhinoptera brasiliensis J. P. Müller, 1836 (Brazilian cownose ray)	southern tip of Brazil to western Florida.
	Rhinoptera javanica J. P. Müller & Henle, 1841 (flapnose ray)	Indo-Pacific off China, India, Indonesia, Iran, Japan, Madagascar, Malaysia, Mozambique, Pakistan, the Philippines, Seychelles, Somalia, South Africa, Sri Lanka, Taiwan, Tanzania, Thailand, Vietnam and possibly Australia
	Rhinoptera jayakari Boulenger, 1895 (Oman cownose ray)	from South Africa to the Philippines; north to Ryukyu Is. and south to eastern Indonesia.
	Rhinoptera marginata (É. Geoffroy Saint-Hilaire, 1817) (Lusitanian cownose ray)	Eastern Atlantic
	Rhinoptera neglecta J. D. Ogilby, 1912 (Australian cownose ray)	Western Pacific Ocean from Queensland to New South Wales in Australia.
	Rhinoptera steindachneri Evermann & O. P. Jenkins, 1891 (Pacific cownose ray)	East Pacific along the coast of Colombia, Costa Rica, Ecuador, El Salvador, Guatemala, Honduras, Mexico, Nicaragua, Panama, and Peru.

There are several other extinct species that only are known from fossil remains:

- †Rhinoptera prisca Woodward, 1907
- †Rhinoptera rasilis Böhm, 1926
- †Rhinoptera raeburni White, 1934
- †Rhinoptera schultzi Hiden, 1995
- †Rhinoptera sherborni White, 1926
- †Rhinoptera smithii Jordan & Beal, 1913
- †Rhinoptera studeri Agassiz, 1843
- †Rhinoptera woodwardi Agassiz, 1843

== See also ==
- List of prehistoric cartilaginous fish
