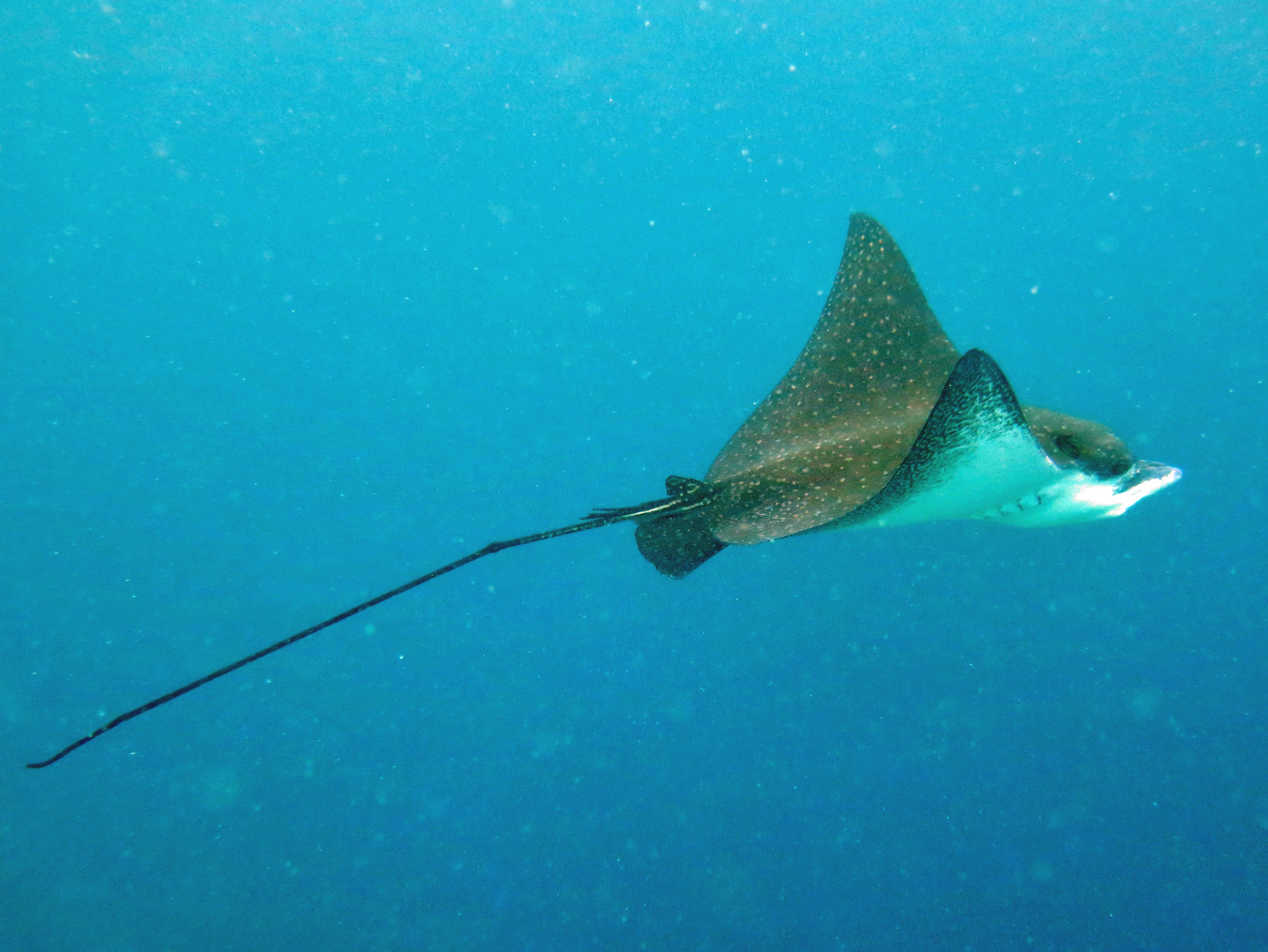
- In the Maldives

Conservation status
- Endangered (IUCN 3.1)

Scientific classification
- Kingdom: Animalia
- Phylum: Chordata
- Class: Chondrichthyes
- Subclass: Elasmobranchii
- Order: Myliobatiformes
- Family: Aetobatidae
- Genus: Aetobatus
- Species: A. ocellatus

Binomial name
- Aetobatus ocellatus (Kuhl, 1823)

= Aetobatus ocellatus =

Species of fish

The ocellated eagle ray or the whitespotted eagle ray, Aetobatus ocellatus, is a species of cartilaginous fish in the eagle ray family Myliobatidae. It is found in the tropical Indo-West Pacific region. In the past it was included in the spotted eagle ray (A. narinari), a species restricted to the Atlantic after the split.

== Description and behavior ==
In the Seychelles

Compared to the spotted eagle ray, A. ocellatus has a longer tail (mean total length 281 vs. 263% DW) and a longer stinging spine (mean length 9.7 vs. 8.9% DW). The background coloration of the dorsal surface in A. ocellatus is dark greenish/greying to almost blackish whereas A. narinari is much paler, medium yellowish to brownish. Their foraging range is based on anthropogenic noises with populations structured according to ontogenetic stage.

=== Reproduction ===
The ocellated eagle ray exhibits ovoviviparity with embryos feeding on yolk initially, then receiving additional nutrients from the mother through indirect absorption of enriched uterine fluid. The gestation period lasts over 12 months and only produces a few pups.

=== Diet ===
The ocellated eagle ray feeds primarily on gastropod, bivalve molluscs, crustaceans, worms, octopuses and fishes.
