= Potamotrygon boesemani =

Conservation status
- Vulnerable (IUCN 3.1)

Scientific classification
- Kingdom: Animalia
- Phylum: Chordata
- Class: Chondrichthyes
- Subclass: Elasmobranchii
- Order: Myliobatiformes
- Family: Potamotrygonidae
- Genus: Potamotrygon
- Species: P. boesemani

Binomial name
- Potamotrygon boesemani Rosa, Carvalho & Almeida Wanderley, 2008

Species of cartilaginous fish

Potamotrygon boesemani, the Suriname freshwater stingray or Boeseman's river stingray, is a type of freshwater tropical ray found exclusively in a river shared by Suriname and Guyana.

== Description ==
This species can be distinguished from its congeners through several characteristics, such as the darker brown dorsal region, with irregular deep orange-red ocellated spots and encircled by irregular broad black rings; more intensely colored irregular ocelli; and the absence of ocelli on the tail. The largest documented female specimen has a size of 42.7 cm (16.8 in) disc width.

== Habitat & distribution ==
This stingray is endemic to Courantyne River in Suriname and Guyana. There are no details about its habitat's depth, but it is suggested to inhabit shallow regions due to its discovery in the river drainage. This species is sometimes captured and sold in either local or international exotic fish shop.
