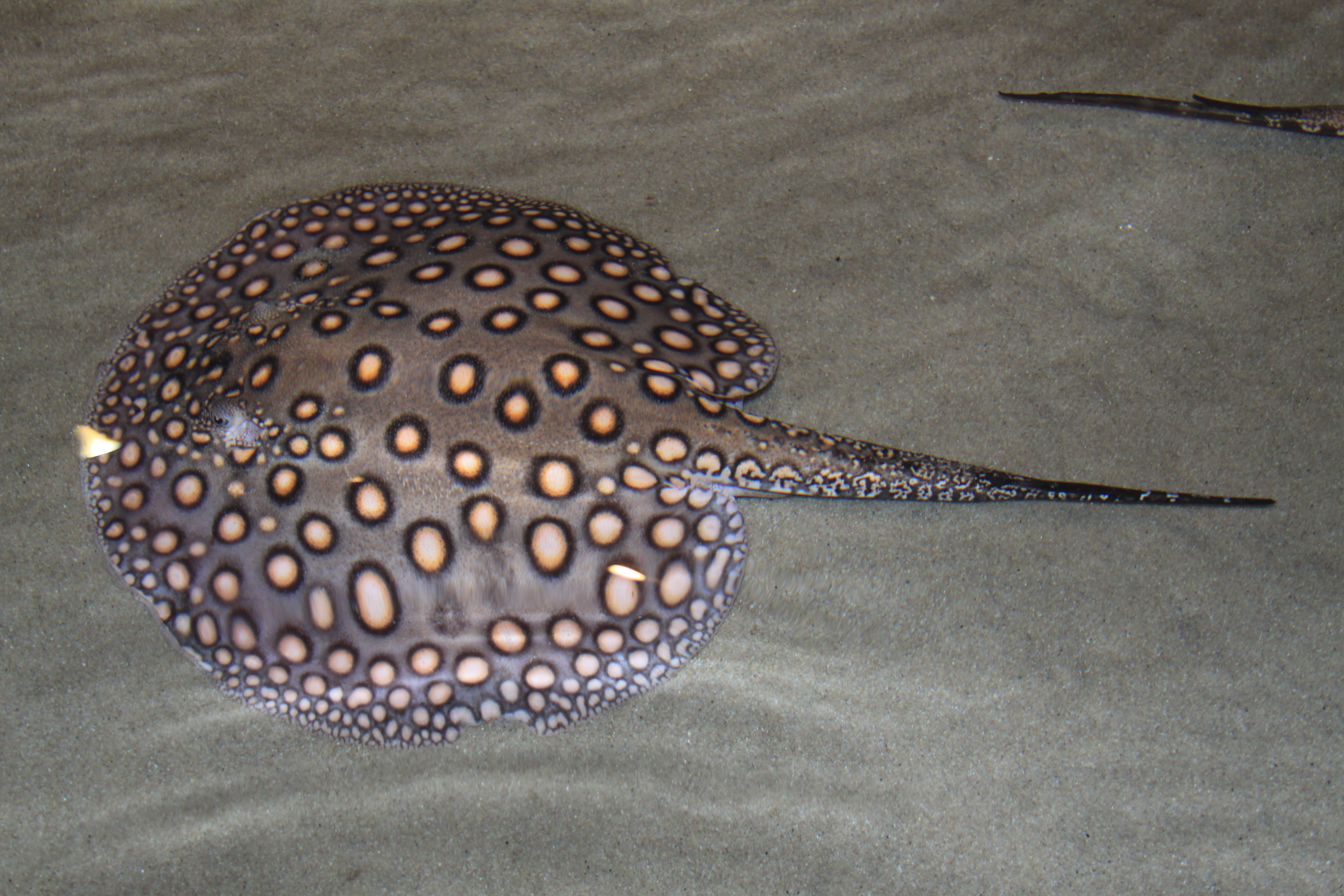
- Potamotrygon motoro

Scientific classification
- Kingdom: Animalia
- Phylum: Chordata
- Class: Chondrichthyes
- Subclass: Elasmobranchii
- Order: Myliobatiformes
- Family: Potamotrygonidae
- Subfamily: Potamotrygoninae
- Genus: Potamotrygon; Garman, 1877

Type species
- Trygon hystrix J. P. Müller & Henle, 1841

= Potamotrygon =

Potamotrygon Temporal range: Middle Eocene–present

Genus of cartilaginous fishes

Potamotrygon is a genus of freshwater stingrays in the family Potamotrygonidae native to the rivers of South America, and sometimes seen in the aquarium trade. It inhabits rivers of tropical and subtropical climates, especially those of the Amazon basin and is virtually present in all South American countries, except for Chile.

Like other stingrays, the fishes of this genus have venomous barbs at the base of their tails, and their stings are dangerous to humans. It is said that the natives of South America fear the stingray more than they do fear the piranha.

Potamotrygon vary considerably in color, pattern and size, with the maximum disc width ranging from 31 cm (1 ft) in P. wallacei to 1.5 m (5 ft) in P. brachyura.

== In the aquarium ==
Though freshwater stingray of other genera do appear in the trade, most are from Potamotrygon. They are best kept with a deep, sandy substrate, in which they bury themselves, often with only the eyes visible. They are not territorial with other animals and can be kept in groups, provided a large enough aquarium is provided. They are carnivorous bottom feeders and require strong filtration as they are rather sensitive to water conditions. Many species of stingray have been bred in captivity and males can be determined by the presence of claspers as in other Chondrichthyans.

== Species ==
There are currently more than 30 recognized extant (living) species in this genus:

- Potamotrygon adamastor Fontenelle, J. P. & de Carvalho, M. R., 2017 (Branco river stingray)
- Potamotrygon albimaculata M. R. de Carvalho, 2016 (Itaituba river stingray, Tapajós river stingray, "P14")
- Potamotrygon amandae Loboda & M. R. de Carvalho, 2013 (Amanda's river stingray)
- Potamotrygon amazona Fontenelle, J. P. & de Carvalho, M. R., 2017 (Upper Amazon raspy river stingray)
- Potamotrygon boesemani R. S. Rosa, M. R. de Carvalho & Wanderley, 2008 (Boeseman's river stingray)
- Potamotrygon brachyura (Günther, 1880) (Short-tailed river stingray)
- Potamotrygon constellata (Vaillant, 1880) (Rough freshwater stingray)
- Potamotrygon falkneri Castex & Maciel, 1963 (Large-spot river stingray)
- Potamotrygon garmani Fontenelle, J. P. & de Carvalho, M. R., 2017 (Garman's river stingray)
- Potamotrygon henlei (Castelnau, 1855) (Big-tooth river stingray)
- Potamotrygon histrix (J. P. Müller & Henle, 1834) (Porcupine river stingray)
- Potamotrygon humerosa Garman, 1913 (False reticulate freshwater stingray)
- Potamotrygon jabuti M. R. de Carvalho, 2016 (Pearl river stingray)
- Potamotrygon leopoldi Castex & Castello, 1970 (White-blotched river stingray)
- Potamotrygon limai Fontenelle, J. P. C. B. Silva & M. R. de Carvalho, 2014 (Zé Lima river stingray)
- Potamotrygon magdalenae (A. H. A. Duméril, 1865) (Magdalena river stingray)
- Potamotrygon marinae Deynat, 2006 (Gold dust stingray)
- Potamotrygon marquesi Silva & Loboda, 2019 (Marques' freshwater stingray)
- Potamotrygon motoro (J. P. Müller & Henle, 1841) (Ocellate river stingray)
- Potamotrygon ocellata (Engelhardt, 1912) (Red-blotched river stingray)
- Potamotrygon orbignyi (Castelnau, 1855) (Smooth-back river stingray)
- Potamotrygon pantanensis Loboda & M. R. de Carvalho, 2013 (Pantanal river stingray)
- Potamotrygon rex M. R. de Carvalho, 2016 (Great river stingray)
- Potamotrygon schroederi Fernández-Yépez, 1958 (Flower ray or rosette river stingray)
- Potamotrygon schuhmacheri Castex, 1964 (Parana river stingray)
- Potamotrygon scobina Garman, 1913 (Raspy river stingray)
- Potamotrygon signata Garman, 1913 (Parnaiba river stingray)
- Potamotrygon siponinmorok Hemraj-Naraine, Fontenelle, Acosta-Santos, Lovejoy, Liverpool & Kolmann, 2026 (Demerara River Stingray)
- Potamotrygon tatianae J. P. C. B. Silva & M. R. de Carvalho, 2011 (Tatiana's river stingray)
- Potamotrygon tigrina M. R. de Carvalho, Sabaj Pérez & Lovejoy, 2011 (Tiger river stingray)
- Potamotrygon wallacei M. R. de Carvalho, R. S. Rosa & M. L. G. Araújo, 2016 (Cururu ray or Wallace's freshwater stingray)
- Potamotrygon yepezi Castex & Castello, 1970 (Maracaibo river stingray)

=== Extinct (fossil) species ===
These species are extinct and only known from Tertiary fossil remains:

- †Potamotrygon canaanorum
- †Potamotrygon contamanensis
- †Potamotrygon rajachloeae
- †Potamotrygon ucayalensis
