= Pascal Deynat =

French naturalist

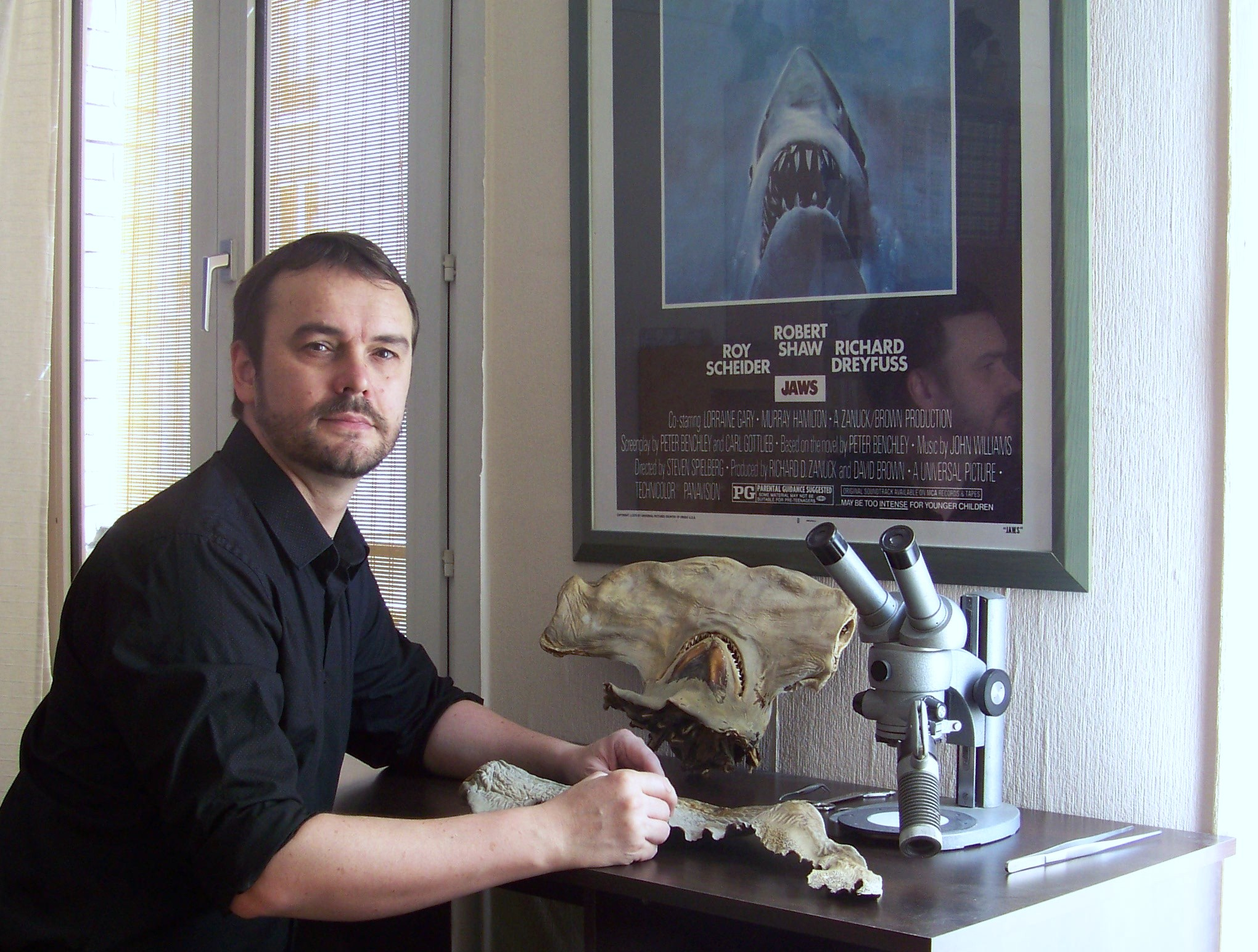
- Pascal Deynat studying the skin coating of a sixgill shark
- Born: January 15, 1965 (age 61); Amiens, Hauts-de-France, France
- Title: Ichthyologist

Pascal Deynat is a French naturalist from the Paris Diderot University. An Ichthyologist by training, he is a specialist in the study of skin coating of cartilaginous fishes as part of the Odontobase Project.

== Biography ==
In 1994, he wrote his first article on the loops of Potamotrygonidae's fossil along with his friend, a Brazilian paleontologist Paulo Brito. His first work on the relationship between the cutaneous denticles of sharks and their ecology was presented at the 7th International Congress of Ichthyology at The Hague.

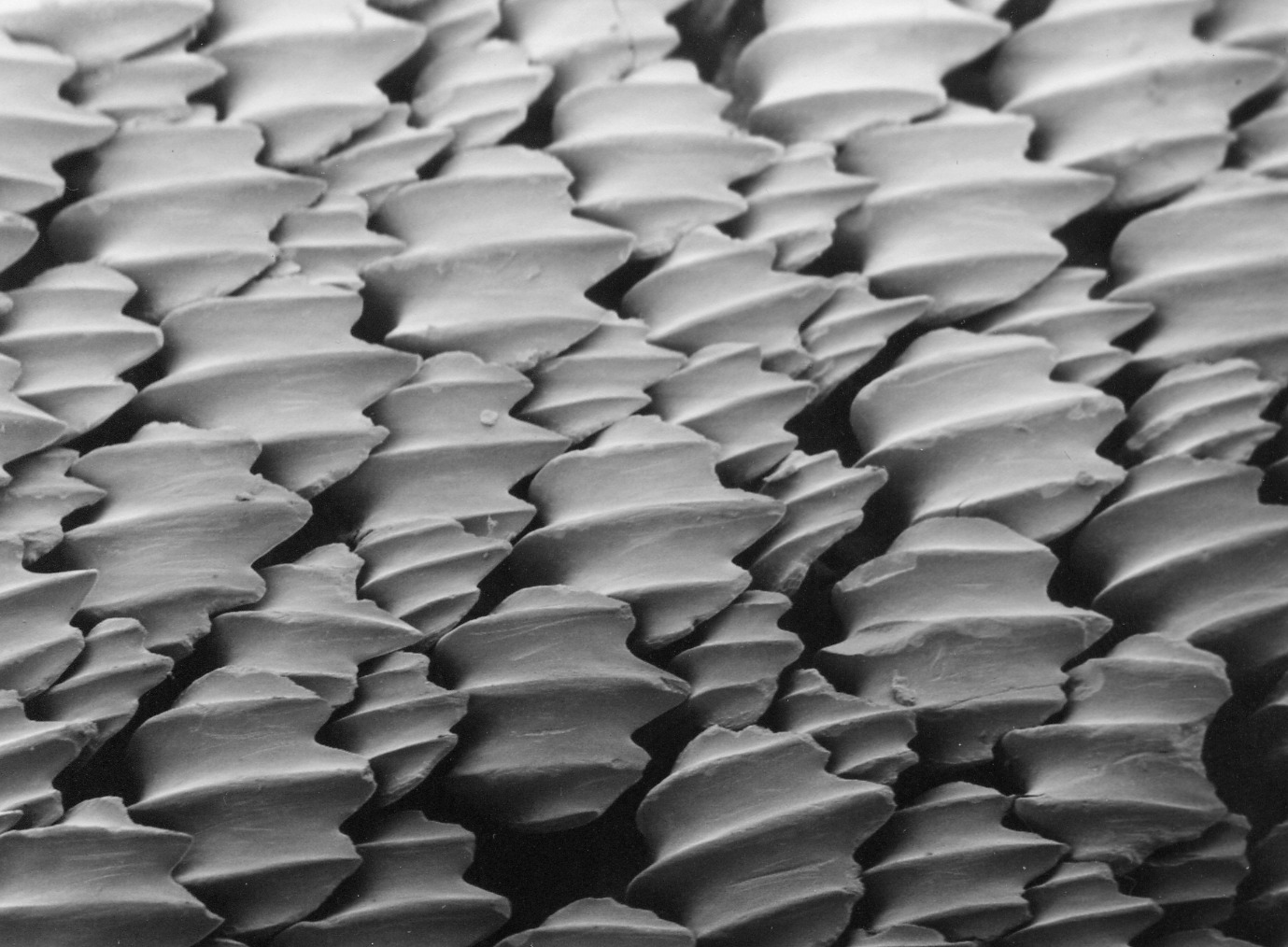
Lemon shark dermal denticles

In 1994, Deynat continued his doctoral research on the systematic and taxonomic applications of the skin covering of Pristiformes and Rajiformes, which he completed with a 15-day stay at the American Museum of Natural History in New York City and at the Smithsonian Institution in Washington.

In 1997, he participated in the production of a poster for Overseas Scientific and Technical Research Office. In the same year, Professor Guy Duhamel offered him a job as a fisheries controller in the Kerguelen Islands without sufficient preparations. Deynat's aquaphobia caused the mission to fail, and he was then forced to leave his host laboratory to find work as a salesman with the bookstore Gibert Joseph.

In 2000, while handling the CD-ROMs of a paleontology database named Paleobase, Deynat had the idea of creating Odontobase to identify and catalog the odontodes (cutaneous denticles, spines and loops) of all species of chondrichthyans. He was working on the project while presenting the subject of his original research to the media. The detailed study of the variations of the cutaneous coating allowed him to discover a new type of denticles, the myrmecoid denticles, typical of tha Raja of the eastern Atlantic. In parallel with his activities, the Gibert Joseph bookstore authorized him to present a photographic exhibition of electron microscopy called "Shark on edge", produced jointing with the National Museum of Natural History.

In 2005, based solely on the characteristics of the skin covering, Deynat demonstrated that saw-fish of the genus Pristis, can be divided into two groups according to the characteristics of their denticles, and the conclusion was identical to a genetic study carried out a few months later. At the end of 2006, he was given the opportunity to use the characteristics of the skin covering for a practical purpose, that of identifying the isolated fins of sharks. This project was done in collaboration with the World Wide Fund for Nature, Shark Alliance and QUAE for fighting against shark finning. While continuing to work on it, his revision work on the skin covering of Potamotrygonidae enabled him to discover a new species from Guyana, which he named with the first name of his daughter Marina, Potamotrygon Marinae. This discovery allowed him to re-emphasize his research with the mainstream press, and raise public awareness of pinning by participating in a debate organized in 2007 as part of the Jules Verne Aventures Festival. He continued his work alone, and in 2009 he published a book for the general public on fish and marine mammals.

In 2010, Deynat's work on the identification of fins was published, which earned him many congratulations without having much concrete effects on the fate of sharks. By continuing the general study of cartilaginous fishes, the Odontobase was completed, which sheded light on the shark attacks that occurred in Réunion in 2011 and 2012. In 2012, he won a legal case against the Encyclopædia Universalis, but lost a case against the marked posts of the National Museum of Natural History in Paris. He therefore continued his research on the applications of Odontobase in the identification of objects covered with stingray, but also in the identification of shark fins for customs services. His specialty allowed him to contribute to various exhibitions, including that of the Oceanographic Museum of Monaco, where he became a leading expert on skin coverings. In 2015, he participated in the short films of La Belle Société Production.

Since 2016, Deynat has been working on writing articles that he had left pending, and continuing his collaborations with scientific organizations in the enrichment of Odontobase and the identification of objects covered with skins of sharks and rays. As of 2020, a new database on the characteristics of the skin covering of bony fish was set up to help refine the identification of ethnological objects.

== Awards ==
In 1991, Deynat obtained a scholarship from the Fondation Marcel Bleustein-Blanchet, whose sponsor was the Prince of Monaco, Rainier III.

In 2016, he was proposed to join the jury for the "taste of science" prize, organized since 2009 by the Minister of Higher Education, Research and Innovation, alongside biologist Pierre-Henri Guyon and prehistorian Marylène Pathou-Mathis. He met the Secretary of State for Research, Thierry Mandon. In 2017, he also met the Minister of Research Frédérique Vidal during the "science for all" operation at the Gibert Joseph bookstore.

In 2020, he was a member of the jury of the Parish Shark Fest, and participated there every year as a guest ever since.

== Additional Activities ==
Deynat also became involved in scientific dissemination and the fight against the trafficking of endangered species. During his years in Amiens, he participated in the Culture and Sciences association, housed in the former house of Jules Verne, down the rue Charles Dubois where he himself lived. During these years, he co-directed a biology-geology workshop, developed an exhibition on sea creatures, and was the editor-in-chief of the association's journal.

Deynat also participated in a number of radio programs, and wrote several articles in the press. He also participated in some written interviews.
