= Potamotrygon amazona =

Conservation status
- Least Concern (IUCN 3.1)

Scientific classification
- Kingdom: Animalia
- Phylum: Chordata
- Class: Chondrichthyes
- Subclass: Elasmobranchii
- Order: Myliobatiformes
- Family: Potamotrygonidae
- Genus: Potamotrygon
- Species: P. amazona

Binomial name
- Potamotrygon amazona Fontenelle & Carvalho, 2017

Species of fish

Potamotrygon amazona, the Upper Amazon raspy freshwater stingray, is a type of freshwater tropical stingray found in the state of Amazonas and Roraima, Brazil.

== Description ==
This species can be distinguished from its congeners through several characteristics: sturdy and thick disc; dark brown to gray dorsal color; body covered with many small whitish-beige irregular spots with small ocelli sometimes present; disc entirely covered by denticles; very prickly robust, wide, and long tail; and relatively short cartilaginous rod. It can reach the maximum size of 40–58 cm (16–23 in) disc width (DW).

== Habitat and distribution ==
This stingray is endemic to the freshwater basins of Rio Jutai and Rio Juruá in Amazonas, and Rio Branco in Roraima. Major threats might include illegal deforestations, albeit not significant yet due to its remote habitats.
