= Potamotrygon amandae =

Conservation status
- Least Concern (IUCN 3.1)

Scientific classification
- Kingdom: Animalia
- Phylum: Chordata
- Class: Chondrichthyes
- Subclass: Elasmobranchii
- Order: Myliobatiformes
- Family: Potamotrygonidae
- Genus: Potamotrygon
- Species: P. amandae

Binomial name
- Potamotrygon amandae Loboda & Carvalho, 2013

Species of cartilaginous fish

Potamotrygon amandae, or Amanda's freshwater stingray, is a type of freshwater tropical ray found in Paraná River, South America.

== Description ==
This species can be distinguished from its congeners on the same genus through several characteristics, such as grayish-dark brown dorsal color, occasional presence of bicolored (white-light gray/light yellow) ocelli on dorsal disc surrounded by black peripheral ring, grayish ventral disc, greater spiracular length, and relatively longer slender tail. The largest maximum size of this ray is believed to be around 34 cm disc width.

== Habitat & distribution ==
This stingray is found mainly in Paraná-Paraguay River basin, encompassing Argentina, Paraguay, Brazil, and a small area in Bolivia. It is currently experiencing a population increase due to its expanding geographic distribution towards new regions of the upper Paraná River, southeastern Brazil. However, it is also sometimes targeted and captured for international exotic fish market.
