= Potamotrygon adamastor =

Conservation status
- Endangered (IUCN 3.1)

Scientific classification
- Kingdom: Animalia
- Phylum: Chordata
- Class: Chondrichthyes
- Subclass: Elasmobranchii
- Order: Myliobatiformes
- Family: Potamotrygonidae
- Genus: Potamotrygon
- Species: P. adamastor

Binomial name
- Potamotrygon adamastor Fontenelle & Carvalho, 2017

Potamotrygon adamastor, the Branco River freshwater stingray, is a type of freshwater tropical ray found exclusively in the state of Roraima, Brazil.

== Description ==
This species can be distinguished from its congeners through several characteristics, such as dark gray dorsal disc; body covered with small yellow-white ocelli with a slender dark contour; small irregular spots on disc margin (sometimes); and robust and wide tail base.The size of this tropical stingray ranges from 45 to 62 cm (18 to 24 in) disc width (DW).

== Habitat & distribution ==
It is endemic to a single locality of Uriracuera river, an upper branch of Rio Branco river system, Roraima, Brazil. This demersal species tends to inhabit the turbid wetlands with sandy sediments. The only threat to this species might be water contamination resulted from nearby illegal mining activities, as there are no records about its capture by fisheries.
