= Potamotrygon limai =

Conservation status
- Near Threatened (IUCN 3.1)

Scientific classification
- Kingdom: Animalia
- Phylum: Chordata
- Class: Chondrichthyes
- Subclass: Elasmobranchii
- Order: Myliobatiformes
- Family: Potamotrygonidae
- Genus: Potamotrygon
- Species: P. limai

Binomial name
- Potamotrygon limai Fontenelle, Da Silva & Carvalho, 2014

Potamotrygon limai is a type of tropical freshwater stingray found exclusively in the state of Rondônia, Brazil. This species is prone to local deforestation activities instead of fishing.

== Description ==
This species can be distinguished from its congeners through several characteristics, such as darker brownish dorsal disc covered with beige to whitish, small spots arranged into concentric patterns, possibility of whitish spots forming vermicular patterns, simpler rostral dermal denticles, and absence of any form of discrete dorsal ocelli. The largest male specimen ever caught is around 65 cm (26 in) disc width.

== Habitat & distribution ==
This tropical ray has been recorded only from Jamari River, a part of Madeira River system in northern area of Rondônia. It is a river fully dammed by Samuel Hydroelectric Dam, which causes a direct threat to this species aside of deforestation around its distribution range.
