= Rhinoptera neglecta =

Conservation status
- Data Deficient (IUCN 3.1)

Scientific classification
- Kingdom: Animalia
- Phylum: Chordata
- Class: Chondrichthyes
- Subclass: Elasmobranchii
- Order: Myliobatiformes
- Family: Rhinopteridae
- Genus: Rhinoptera
- Species: R. neglecta

Binomial name
- Rhinoptera neglecta J. D. Ogilby, 1912

Species of fish

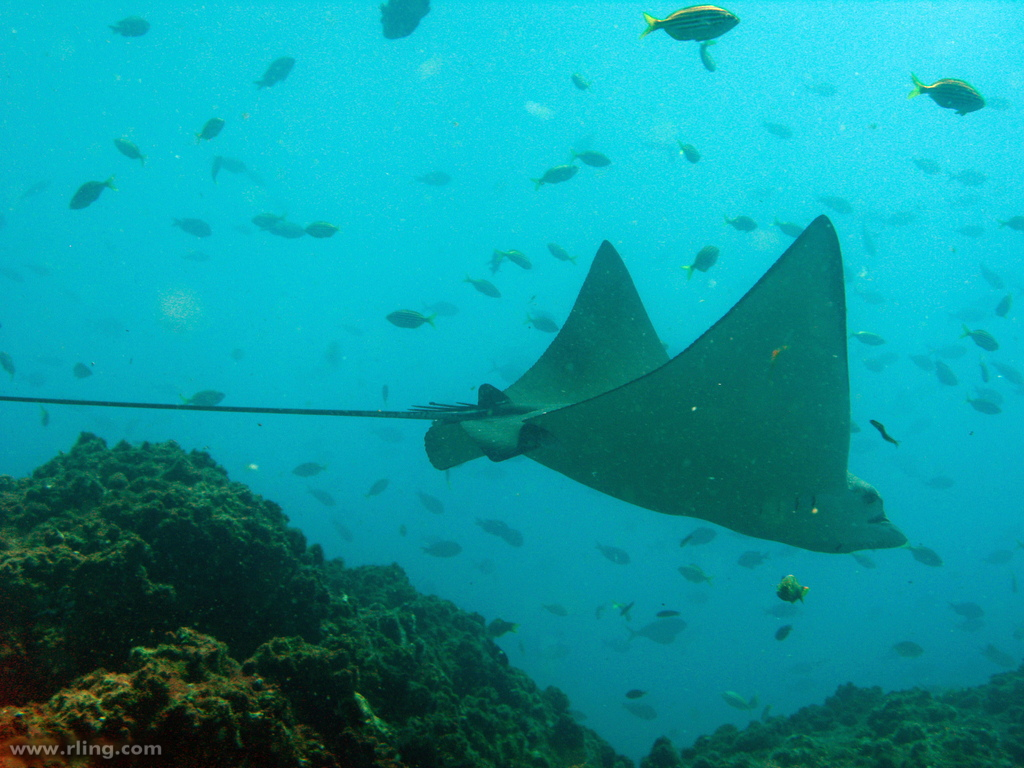
image of Australian Cownose Ray

Rhinoptera neglecta, the Australian cownose ray, is a species of the Rhinopteridae family. It is found in the Western Pacific Ocean from Queensland to New South Wales in Australia. The species is 86 centimeters long.

== Status ==
As of 2015, the IUCN listed Rhinoptera neglecta as Data Deficient.
