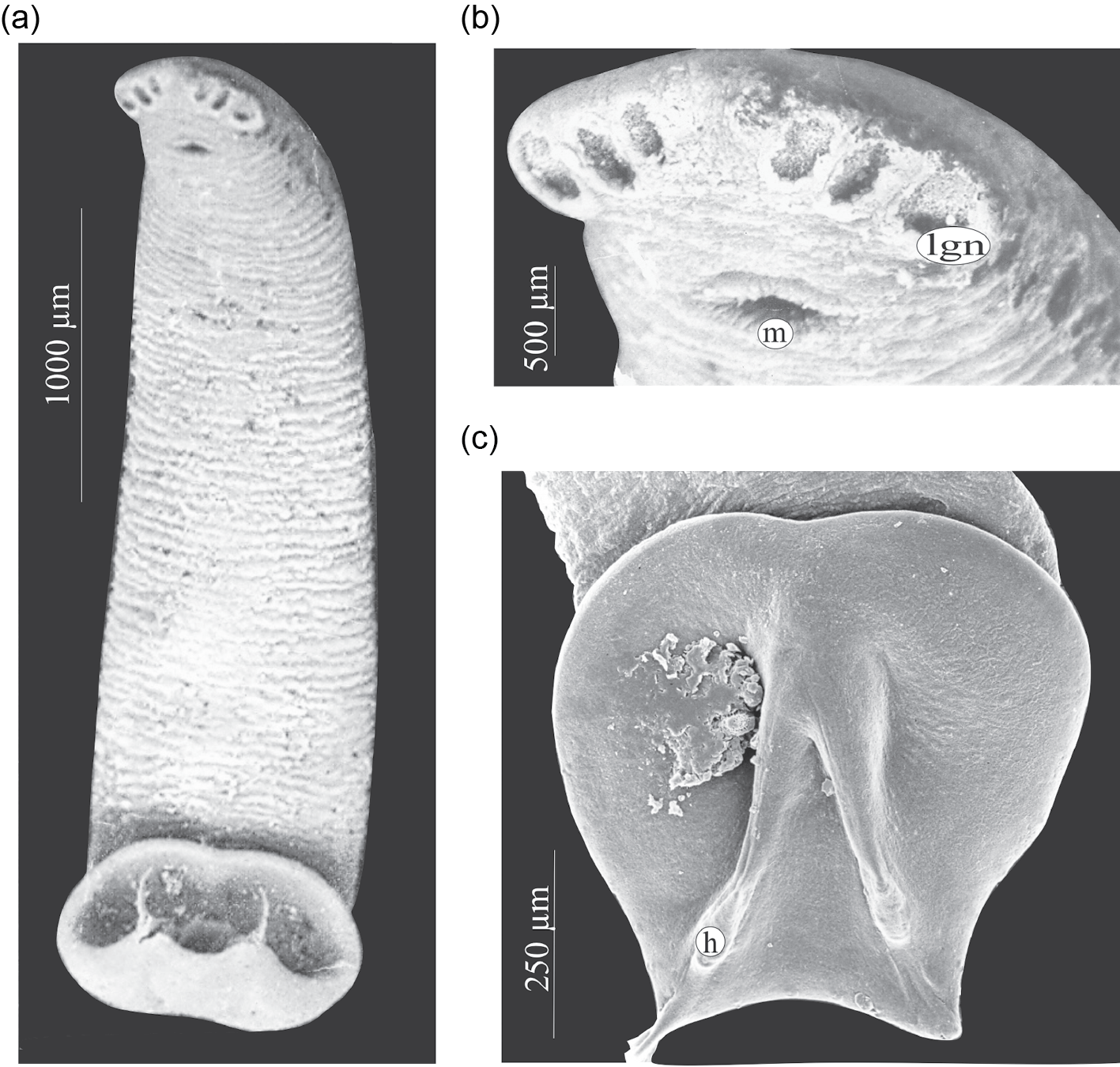
- Triloculotrema euzeti

Scientific classification
- Kingdom: Animalia
- Phylum: Platyhelminthes
- Class: Monogenea
- Order: Monocotylidea
- Family: Monocotylidae; Taschenberg, 1879

= Monocotylidae =

Family of flatworms

Monocotylidae is a family of monogenean flatworms.

== Genera ==
- Anoplocotyloides
- Calicotyle
- Cathariotrema
- Clemacotyle
- Dasybatotrema
- Decacotyle
- Dendromonocotyle
- Dictyocotyle
- Empruthotrema
- Euzetia
- Heliocotyle
- Heterocotyle
- Holocephalocotyle
- Mehracotyle
- Merizocotyle
- Monocotyle
- Mycteronastes
- Myliocotyle
- Neoheterocotyle
- Papillocotyle
- Potamotrygonocotyle
- Septesinus
- Spinuris
- Squalotrema
- Thaumatocotyle
- Triloculotrema
