= Franz Werner =

Austrian zoologist and explorer

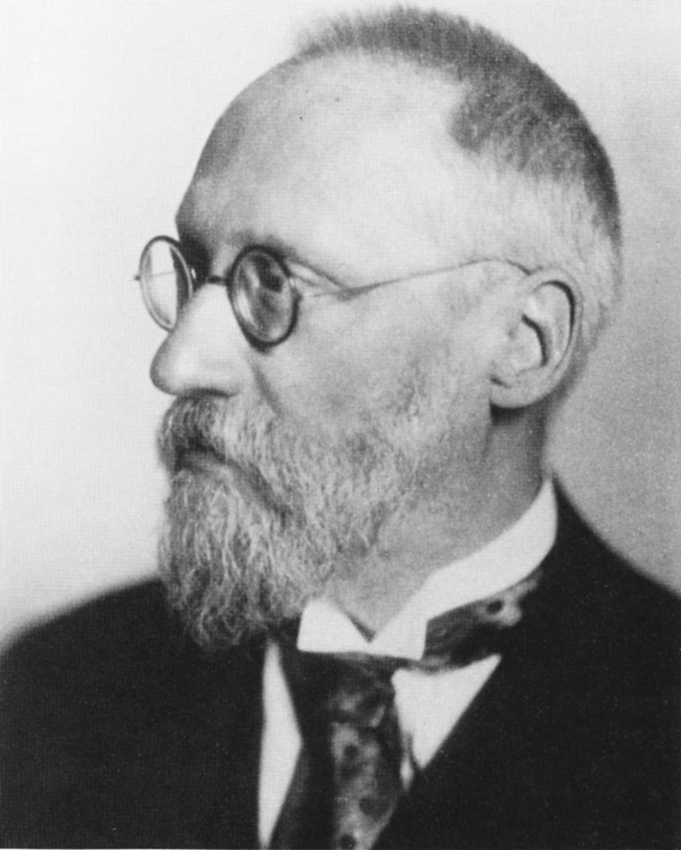
- Franz Werner.
- Born: 15 August 1867; Vienna
- Died: 28 February 1939 (aged 71); Vienna
- Known for: Binomial nomenclature; Scientific classification; Taxonomy
- Scientific career
- Fields: Biology; Zoology
- Institutions: Vienna Natural History Museum
- Author abbrev. (zoology): Werner

Franz Josef Maria Werner (15 August 1867 in Vienna – 28 February 1939 in Vienna) was an Austrian zoologist and explorer. Specializing as a herpetologist and entomologist, Werner described numerous species and other taxa of frogs, snakes, insects, and other organisms.

His father introduced him at age six to reptiles and amphibians. A brilliant student, he corresponded often with George Albert Boulenger (1858–1937) and Oskar Boettger (1844–1910) who encouraged his studies with these animals. Werner obtained his doctorate in Vienna in 1890 and then after spending a year in Leipzig, began to teach at the Vienna Institute of Zoology. In 1919, he became tenured as a professor, maintaining this title until his retirement in 1933.

Although working close to the Vienna Natural History Museum, he could not use their herpetological collections, after the death of its director, Franz Steindachner (1834–1919), who did not like Werner, and had barred him from accessing the collections.

Werner succeeded in constituting an immense personal collection, and published more than 550 publications principally on herpetology. He named many new species of reptiles, amphibians, and arthropods, of which he specialized in orthopterans and scorpions.

He published in 1931, Dritte Klasse der Craniota: dritte und zugleich letzte Klasse der Ichthyopsida: Amphibia, Lurche: allgemeine Einleitung in said Naturgeschichte der Amphibia. His book, Amphibien und Reptilien (1910), contributed to the popularization of terraphilia, or raising pet reptiles and amphibians in terraria.

Nota bene: Franz Werner should not be confused with Israeli herpetologist Yehudah L. Werner (born 1931).

== List of taxa described by Franz Werner ==
=== higher order taxa ===
- Family: Leptodactylidae (Werner, 1896) (49 genera of Southern frogs or tropical frogs)
- Subfamily: Leptodactylinae (Werner, 1896)
- Genus: Astylosternus (Werner, 1898)

=== Species ===
==== Fishes ====
- Himantura schmardae (Werner, 1904) (Chupare Stingray)
- Neobola nilotica Werner, 1919

==== Amphibians ====
===== Frogs and Toads =====
- Turkish Frog, Rana holtzi (Werner, 1898)
- Rana leporipes (Werner, 1930)
- Nikkō Frog, Rana ornativentris (Werner, 1903)
- Garman New Guinea Tree Frog, Litoria jeudii (Werner, 1901)
- Humming Frog, Neobatrachus pelobatoides (Werner, 1914)
- Eleutherodactylus affinis (Werner, 1899)
- Eleutherodactylus appendiculatus (Werner, 1894)
- Eleutherodactylus bisignatus (Werner, 1899)
- Eleutherodactylus frater (Werner, 1899)
- Eleutherodactylus laevissimus (Werner, 1896)
- Eleutherodactylus rostralis (Werner, 1896)
- Rheobates palmatus (Werner, 1899)
- Astylosternus diadematus (Werner, 1898)
- Leptopelis boulengeri (Werner, 1898)
- Leptopelis brevirostris (Werner, 1898)
- Leptopelis modestus (Werner, 1898)
- Craugastor laevissimus (Werner, 1896)
- Craugastor rostralis (Werner, 1896)
- Eleutherodactylus affinis (Werner, 1899)
- Eleutherodactylus appendiculatus (Werner, 1894)
- Eleutherodactylus bisignatus (Werner, 1899)
- Eleutherodactylus frater (Werner, 1899)
- Phrynopus columbianus (Werner, 1899)
- Atelopus subornatus (Werner, 1899)
- Chaunus limensis (Werner, 1901)
- Chaunus schneideri (Werner, 1894)
- Rhaebo nasicus (Werner, 1903)
- Wolterstorffina parvipalmata (Werner, 1898)
- Telmatobius verrucosus (Werner, 1899)
- Cycloramphus asper (Werner, 1899)
- Cycloramphus bolitoglossus (Werner, 1897)
- Fejervarya schlueteri (Werner, 1893)
- Hypsiboas pellucens (Werner, 1901)
- Osteocephalus verruciger (Werner, 1901)
- Scinax dolloi (Werner, 1903)
- Sphaenorhynchus platycephalus (Werner, 1894)
- Litoria jeudii (Werner, 1901)
- Afrixalus quadrivittatus (Werner, 1908)
- Incertae sedis: Hyperolius papyri (Werner, 1908)
- Hyperolius balfouri (Werner, 1908)
- Neobatrachus pelobatoides (Werner, 1914)
- Oreophryne brachypus (Werner, 1898)
- Oreophryne wolterstorffi (Werner, 1901)
- Plethodontohyla angulifera (Werner, 1903)
- Phrynomantis annectens (Werner, 1910)
- Ptychadena aequiplicata (Werner, 1898)
- Ptychadena schillukorum (Werner, 1908)
- Incertae Sedis: Rana temporaria var. nigromaculata (Werner, 1897)
- Huia leporipes (Werner, 1930)
- Rana holtzi (Werner, 1898)
- Rana ornativentris (Werner, 1903)
- Buergeria pollicaris (Werner, 1914)

===== Salamanders =====
- Bolitoglossa dofleini (Werner, 1903)
- Bolitoglossa palmata (Werner, 1897)

===== Caecilians =====
- Crotaphatrema bornmuelleri (Werner, 1899)

==== Reptiles ====
===== Snakes =====
- Vipera bornmuelleri (Werner, 1898)
- Daboia palaestinae (Werner, 1938)
- Bothrops oligolepis (Werner, 1901)
- Atheris ceratophora (Werner, 1895)
- Macrovipera schweizeri (Werner, 1935)
- Paranaja multifasciata (Werner, 1902)
- Elaphe persica (Werner, 1913)
- Elapsoidea laticincta (Werner, 1919)
- Coluber andreanus (Werner, 1917)
- Lampropeltis triangulum arcifera (Werner, 1903)
- Leptotyphlops rubrolineatus (Werner, 1901)
- Micrurus diastema alienus (Werner, 1903)
- Micrurus diastema sapperi (Werner, 1903)
- Micrurus frontifasciatus (Werner, 1927)
- Micrurus lemniscatus frontifasciatus (Werner, 1927)
- Micrurus multifasciatus hertwigi (Werner, 1897)
- Micrurus steindachneri steindachneri (Werner, 1901)
- Morelia spilota macrospila (Werner, 1910)
- Chrysopelea ornata ornatissima (Werner, 1925)

===== Lizards =====
- Werner's Leaf-toed Gecko, Asaccus elisae
- Ebner's Skink, Chalcides ebneri ( Werner, 1931)
- Gastropholis prasina ( Werner, 1904)

===== Amphibaenians =====
- Monopeltis leonhardi Werner, 1910

==== Insects ====
- Creobroter fasciatus (Werner, 1927) (a west Asian mantid)
- Hebardiella karnyi (Werner, 1924) (a west Asian mantid)
- Hebardiella rehni (Werner, 1924) (a west Asian mantid)

=== Taxa named in honor of Franz Werner ===
- Achalinus werneri (snake species)
- Aparallactus werneri (snake species)
- Arthroseps werneri (lizard species) = Ecpleopus gaudichaudii
- Atractus werneri (snake species)
- Chamaelycus werneri (snake species)
- Clarias werneri Boulenger, 1906 Walking Catfish from Africa.
- Dendropsophus werneri (frog species)
- Dipsadoboa werneri (snake species)
- Firmicus werneri (spider species)
- Iguanognathus werneri (snake species)
- Olios werneri (spider species)
- Pachydactylus werneri (gecko species)
- Stenaelurillus werneri (spider species)
- Trioceros werneri (chameleon species)
- Werneria (genus of toads)
- Xenodon werneri (snake species)
