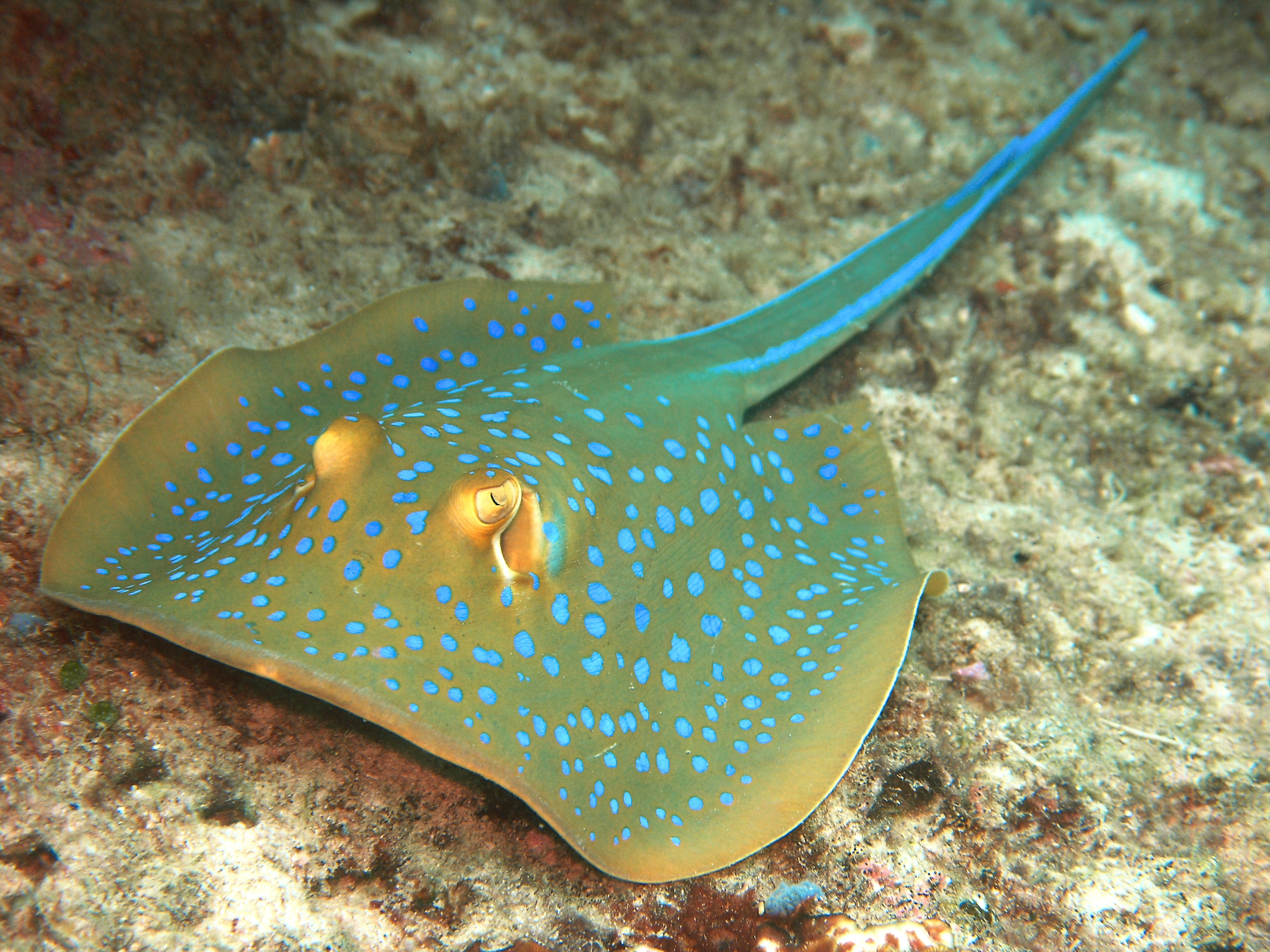
- Bluespotted ribbontail ray (T. lymma)

Scientific classification
- Kingdom: Animalia
- Phylum: Chordata
- Class: Chondrichthyes
- Subclass: Elasmobranchii
- Order: Myliobatiformes
- Family: Dasyatidae
- Subfamily: Neotrygoninae
- Genus: Taeniura; J. P. Müller & Henle, 1837

Type species
- Taeniura lymma Gray, 1830

Synonyms
- Discobatis Miklukho-Maclay & Macleay, 1886; Discotrygon Fowler, 1910

= Taeniura =

Genus of cartilaginous fishes

Taeniura is a genus of stingrays in the family Dasyatidae. The species Taeniurops grabata and T. meyeni were formerly placed in this genus. However, phylogenetic research has shown that these two species are not closely related to T. lymma, and they have been assigned to a separate genus, Taeniurops.

== Species ==
- Taeniura lessoni Last, W. T. White, & Naylor, 2016 (Oceania fantail ray)
- Taeniura lymma (Forsskål, 1775) (Bluespotted ribbontail ray)
