= Bluespotted ribbontail ray =

Conservation status
- Least Concern (IUCN 3.1)

Scientific classification
- Kingdom: Animalia
- Phylum: Chordata
- Class: Chondrichthyes
- Subclass: Elasmobranchii
- Order: Myliobatiformes
- Family: Dasyatidae
- Genus: Taeniura
- Species: T. lymma

Binomial name
- Taeniura lymma (Forsskål, 1775)
- Range of the bluespotted ribbontail ray

Synonyms
- Raja lymma Forsskål, 1775; Trygon ornatus Gray, 1830

Species of cartilaginous fish

The bluespotted ribbontail ray (Taeniura lymma) is a species of stingray in the family Dasyatidae. Found from the intertidal zone to a depth of 30 m (100 ft), this species is common throughout the tropical Indian and western Pacific Oceans in nearshore, coral reef–associated habitats. It is a fairly small ray, not exceeding 35 cm (14 in) in width, with a mostly smooth, oval pectoral fin disc, large protruding eyes, and a relatively short and thick tail with a deep fin fold underneath. It can be easily identified by its striking color pattern of many electric blue spots on a yellowish background, with a pair of blue stripes on the tail.

At night, small groups of bluespotted ribbontail rays follow the rising tide onto sandy flats to root for small benthic invertebrates and bony fishes in the sediment. When the tide recedes, the rays separate and withdraw to shelters on the reef. Reproduction is through Ovoviviparity, with females giving birth to litters of up to seven young. This ray is capable of injuring humans with its venomous tail spines, though it prefers to flee if threatened. Because of its beauty and size, the bluespotted ribbontail ray is popular with private aquarists despite being poorly suited to captivity.

== Taxonomy and phylogeny ==
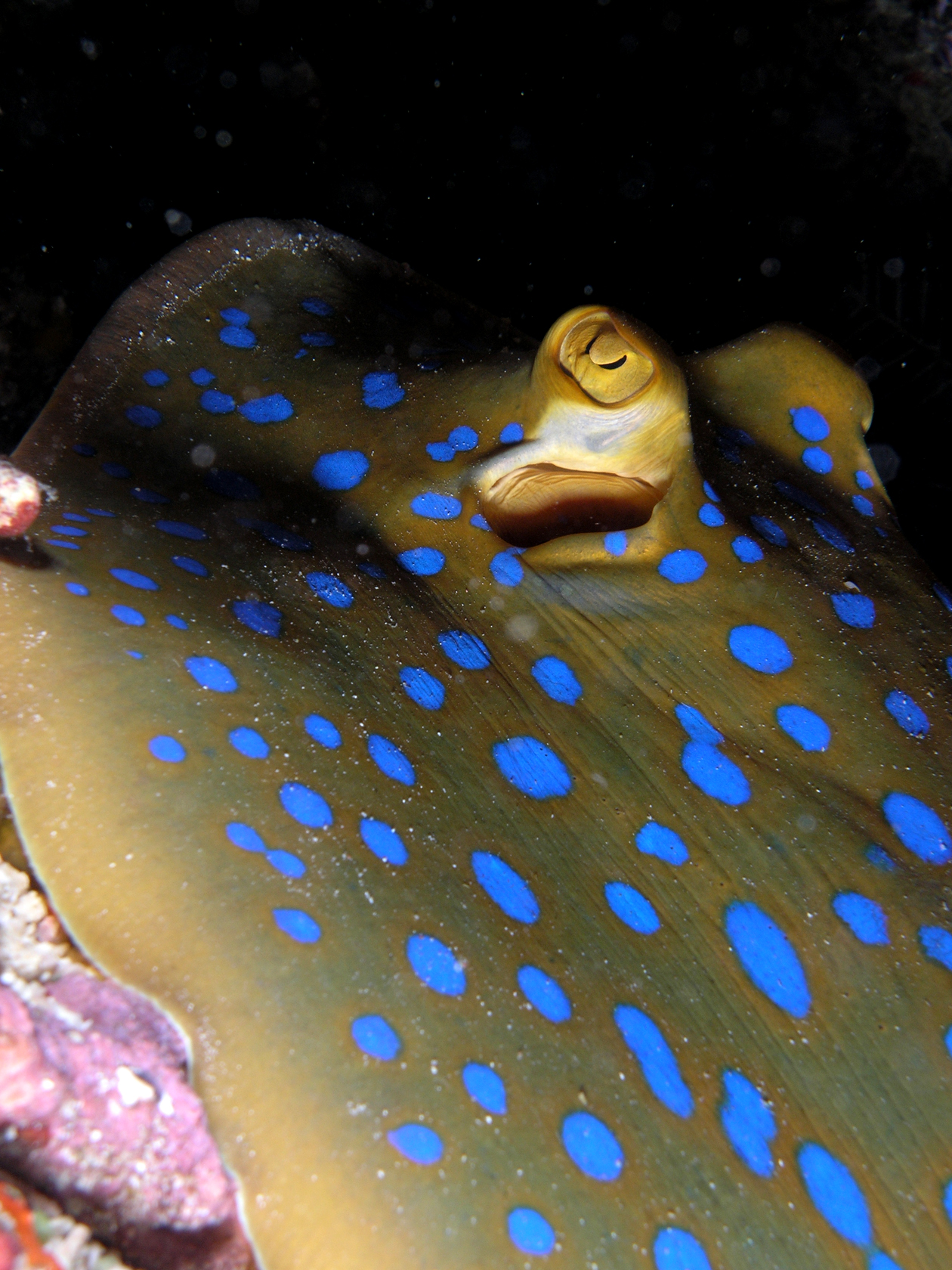
A bluespotted ribbontail ray in Komodo National Park, Indonesia

The bluespotted ribbontail ray was originally described as Raja lymma by Swedish naturalist Peter Forsskål, in his 1775 Descriptiones Animalium quae in itinere ad maris australis terras per annos 1772, 1773, et 1774 suscepto collegit, observavit, et delineavit Joannes Reinlioldus Forster, etc., curante Henrico Lichtenstein. The specific epithet lymma means "dirt". Forsskål did not designate a type specimen. In 1837, German biologists Johannes Peter Müller and Friedrich Gustav Jakob Henle created the genus Taeniura for Trygon ornatus, now known to be a junior synonym of this species.

Other common names used for this species include bluespotted ray, bluespotted fantail ray, bluespotted lagoon ray, bluespotted stingray, fantail ray, lesser fantail ray, lagoon ray, reef ray, ribbon-tailed stingray, and ribbontail stingray. Morphological examination has suggested that the bluespotted ribbontail ray is more closely related to the amphi-American Himantura (H. pacifica and H. schmardae) and the river stingrays (Potamotrygonidae) than to the congeneric blotched fantail ray (T. meyeni), which is closer to Dasyatis and Indo-Pacific Himantura.

== Distribution and habitat ==
Widespread in the nearshore waters of the tropical Indo-Pacific region, the bluespotted ribbontail ray has a range that extends around the periphery of the Indian Ocean from South Africa to the Arabian Peninsula to Southeast Asia, including Madagascar, Mauritius, Zanzibar, the Seychelles, Sri Lanka, and the Maldives. It is rare in the Persian Gulf and Gulf of Oman. In the Pacific Ocean, this species is found from the Philippines to northern Australia, as well as around numerous Melanesian and Polynesian islands as far east as the Solomon Islands. Rarely found deeper than 30 m (100 ft), the bluespotted ribbontail ray is a bottom-dwelling species that frequents coral reefs and adjacent sandy flats. It is also commonly encountered in the intertidal zone and tidal pools, and has been sighted near seagrass beds. Every summer, considerable numbers of bluespotted ribbontail rays arrive off South Africa.

== Description ==
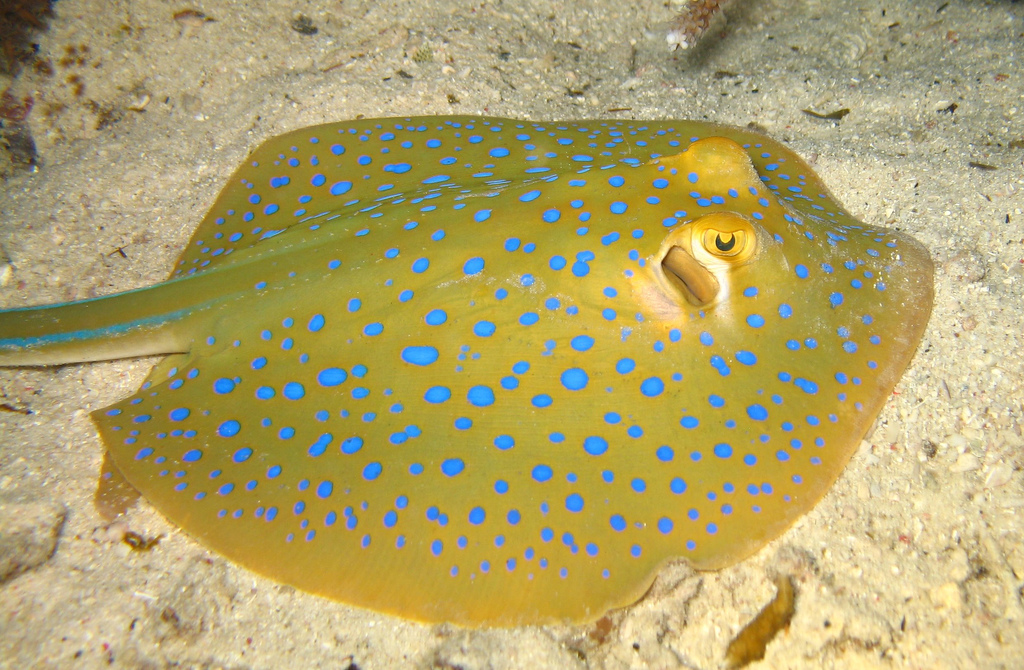
The bluespotted ribbontail ray has distinctive coloration.

The pectoral fin disc of the bluespotted ribbontail ray is oval in shape, around 12-14 inches wide, with a rounded angular snout. The large, protruding eyes are immediately followed by the broad spiracles. There is a narrow flap of skin between the nares with a fringed posterior margin, reaching past the mouth. The lower jaw dips at the middle and deep furrows are present at the mouth corners. There are 15–24 rows of teeth in each jaw, arranged into pavement-like plates, and two large papillae on the floor of the mouth. The pelvic fins are narrow and angular. The thick, depressed tail measures about 1.5 times the disc length and bears one or two (usually two) serrated spines well behind the tail base; there is a deep fin fold on the ventral surface, reaching the tip of the tail, and a low midline ridge on the upper surface.

The skin is generally smooth, save for perhaps a scattering of small thorns on the middle of the back. The dorsal coloration is striking, consisting of numerous circular, neon blue spots on a yellowish brown or green skin; the spots vary in size, becoming smaller and denser towards the disc margin. The tail has two stripes of the same blue running along each side as far as the spines. The eyes are bright yellow and the belly is white. Individuals found off southern Africa may lack the blue tail stripes. The bluespotted ribbontail ray grows to 35 cm (14 in) across, 80 cm (31 in) long, and 5 kg (11 lb).

== Biology and ecology ==
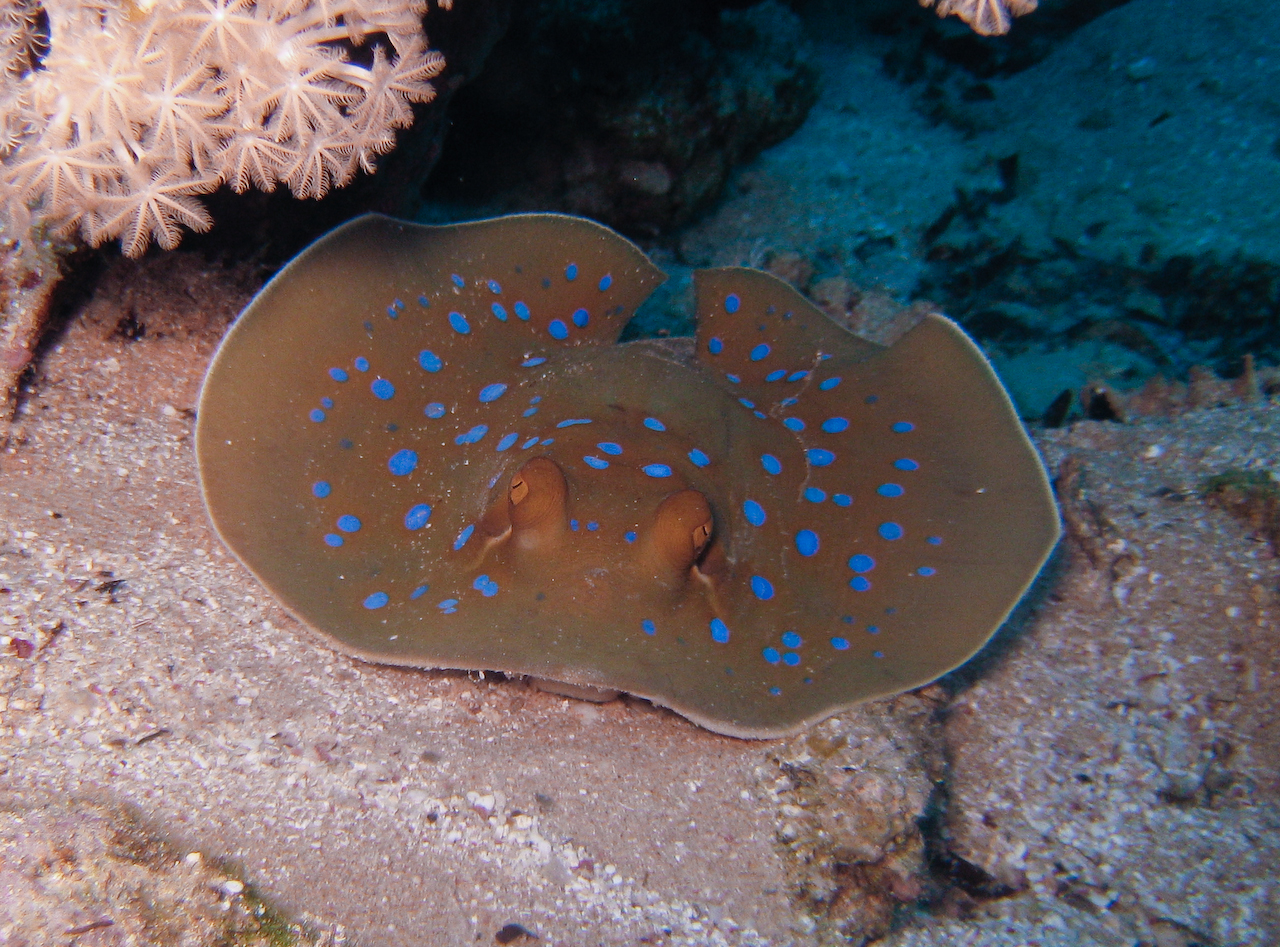
The bluespotted ribbontail ray hides amongst coral during the day.

One of the most abundant stingrays inhabiting Indo-Pacific reefs, the bluespotted ribbontail ray generally spends the day hidden alone inside caves or under coral ledges or other debris (including from shipwrecks), often with only its tail sticking out. At night, small groups assemble and swim onto shallow sandy flats with the rising tide to feed. Unlike many other stingrays, this species seldom buries itself in sand. The bluespotted ribbontail ray excavates sand pits in search of molluscs, polychaete worms, shrimps, crabs, and small benthic bony fishes; when prey is located, it is trapped by the body of the ray and maneuvered into the mouth with the disc. Other fishes, such as goatfish, frequently follow foraging rays, seeking food missed by the ray.

Breeding in the bluespotted ribbontail ray occurs from late spring to summer; the male follows the female and nips at her disc, eventually biting and holding onto her for copulation. There is also a documented instance of a male holding onto the disc of a smaller male bluespotted stingray (Neotrygon kuhlii), in a possible case of mistaken identity. Adult males have been observed gathering in shallow water, which may relate to reproduction. Like other stingrays, this species is aplacental viviparous: the embryos are initially sustained by yolk, which later in development is supplemented by histotroph ("uterine milk", containing mucus, fat, and proteins) produced by the mother. The gestation period is uncertain, but is thought to be between four and twelve months long. Females bear litters of up to seven young, each a miniature version of the adult measuring around 13–14 cm (5.1–5.5 in) across. Males attain sexual maturity at a disc width of 20–21 cm (7.9–8.3 in); the maturation size of females is unknown.

Known predators of the bluespotted ribbontail ray include hammerhead sharks (Sphyrna) and bottlenose dolphins (Tursiops); it is also potentially preyed upon by other large fishes and marine mammals. When threatened, this ray tends to flee at high speed in a zigzag pattern, to throw off pursuers. Numerous parasites have been identified from this species: the tapeworms Aberrapex manjajiae, Anthobothrium taeniuri, Cephalobothrium taeniurai, Echinobothrium elegans and E. helmymohamedi, Kotorelliella jonesi, Polypocephalus saoudi, and Rhinebothrium ghardaguensis and R. taeniuri, the monogeneans Decacotyle lymmae, Empruthotrema quindecima, Entobdella australis, and Pseudohexabothrium taeniurae, the flatworms Pedunculacetabulum ghardaguensis and Anaporrhutum albidum, the nematode Mawsonascaris australis, the copepod Sheina orri, and the protozoan Trypanosoma taeniurae. This ray has been observed soliciting cleanings from the bluestreak cleaner wrasse (Labroides dimidiatus) by raising the margins of its disc and pelvic fins.

== Human interactions ==
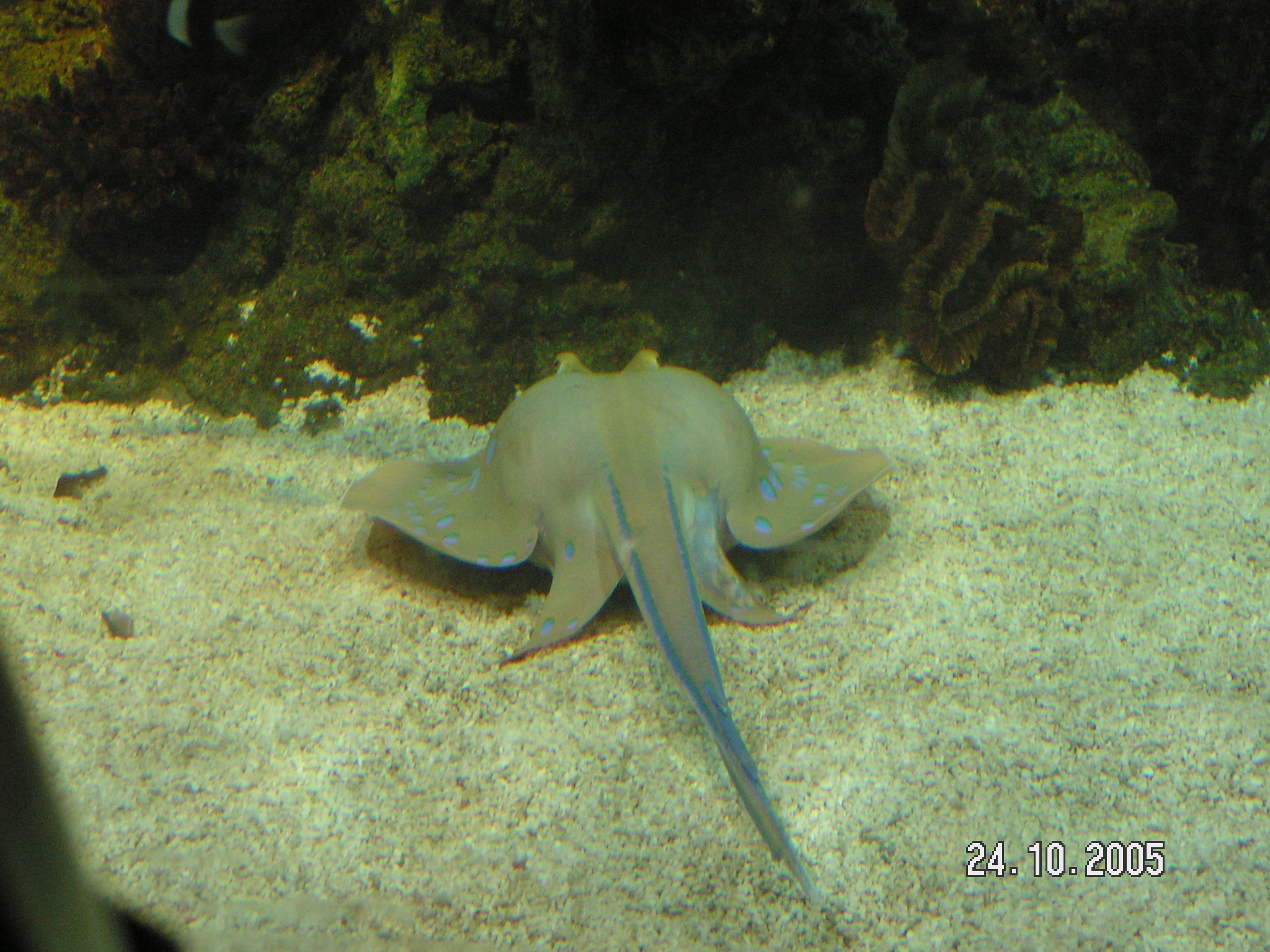
A pregnant bluespotted ribbontail ray at The Deep

While timid and innocuous towards humans, the bluespotted ribbontail ray is capable of inflicting an excruciating wound with its venomous tail spines. Its attractive appearance and relatively small size has resulted in its being the most common stingray found in the home aquarium trade. It seldom fares well in captivity and few hobbyists are able to maintain one for long. Many specimens refuse to feed in the aquarium, and seemingly healthy individuals often inexplicably die or stop feeding. A higher degree of success has been achieved by public aquariums and a breeding project is maintained by the European Association of Zoos and Aquaria (for example, a total of 15 pups were born at Lisbon Oceanarium from 2011 to 2013). The bluespotted ribbontail ray is utilized as food in East Africa, Southeast Asia, and Australia; it is captured intentionally or incidentally using gillnets, longlines, spears, and fence traps.

The International Union for Conservation of Nature (IUCN) has assessed the bluespotted ribbontail ray as Least Concern. Although relatively common and widely distributed, this species faces continuing degradation of its coral reef habitat throughout its range, from development and destructive fishing practices using cyanide or dynamite. Its populations are under heavy pressure by artisanal and commercial fisheries, and by local collecting for the aquarium trade.
