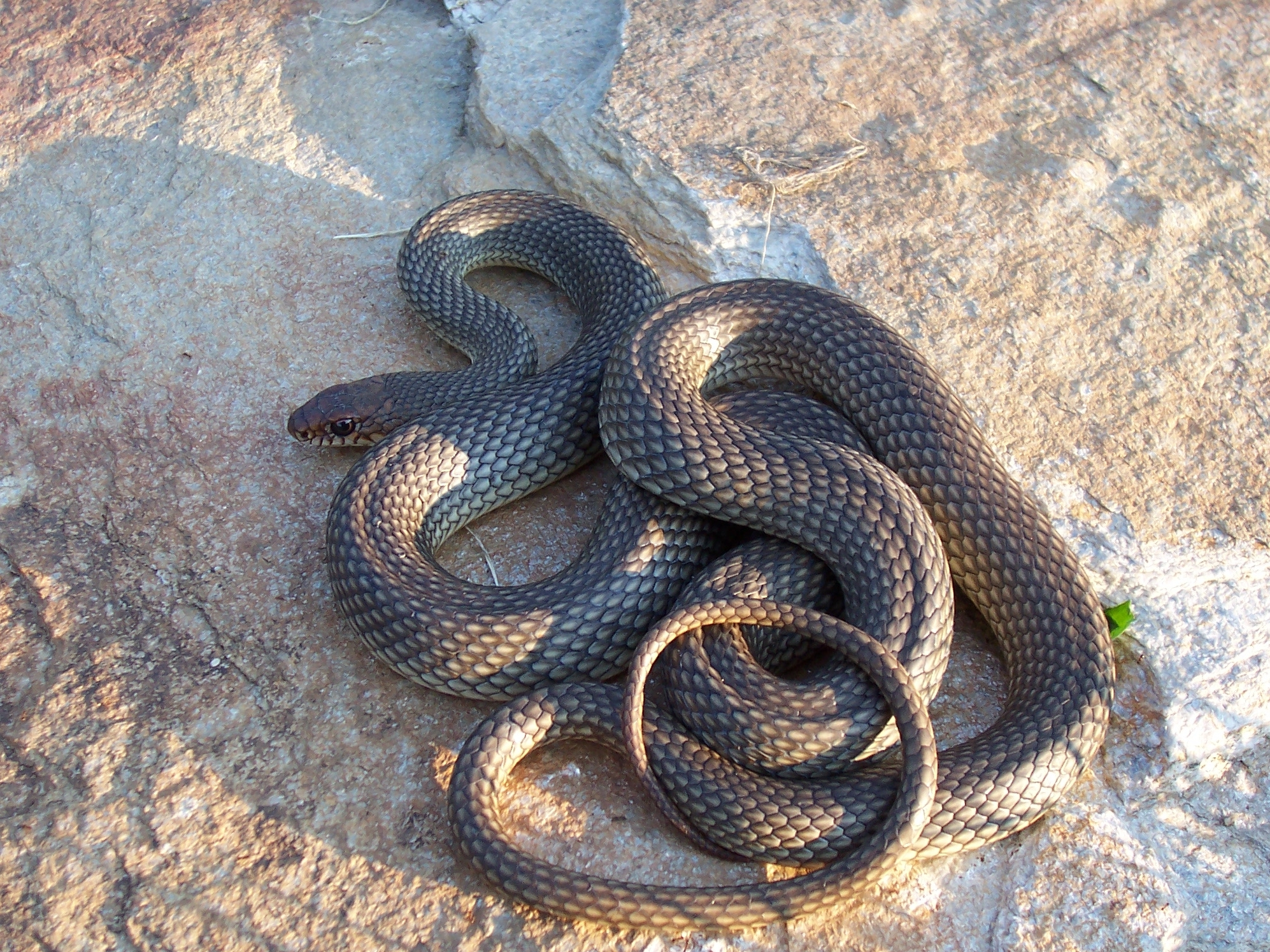
- Dolichophis caspius

Scientific classification
- Kingdom: Animalia
- Phylum: Chordata
- Class: Reptilia
- Order: Squamata
- Suborder: Serpentes
- Family: Colubridae
- Subfamily: Colubrinae
- Genus: Dolichophis; Gistel, 1868

= Dolichophis =

Genus of snakes

Dolichophis is a genus of snakes of the family Colubridae.

== Geographic range ==
Species in the genus Dolichophis are found in Southeast Europe and the Middle East.

== Species ==
Four species are recognized as being valid.

Image	Scientific name	Common name	Distribution
	Dolichophis andreanus (F. Werner, 1917)	Andreas's racer	Iran
	Dolichophis caspius (Gmelin, 1789)	Caspian whipsnake	Albania, Bulgaria, Croatia, Greece, southern Hungary, Kazakhstan, Moldova, Montenegro, North Macedonia, Romania, southern Russia, Serbia, Turkey, southern Ukraine
	Dolichophis jugularis (Linnaeus, 1758)	black whipsnake, large whip snake	Cyprus, Greece, Iran, Iraq, Israel, Jordan, Kuwait, Lebanon, Malta, Syria, Turkey
	Dolichophis schmidti (Nikolsky, 1909)	red-bellied racer, Schmidt's whip snake	Caucasus and Middle East, from Dagestan to Turkmenistan and south into Syria, Jordan, and northern Iran

Nota bene: A binomial authority in parentheses indicates that the species was originally described in a genus other than Dolicophis.
