= New Guinea tree frog =

New Guinea tree frog may refer to several different species of frogs:

- Garman New Guinea tree frog
- Northern New Guinea tree frog
- New Guinea tree frog (Ranoidea genimaculata)
- Southern New Guinea tree frog
- White-lipped tree frog
