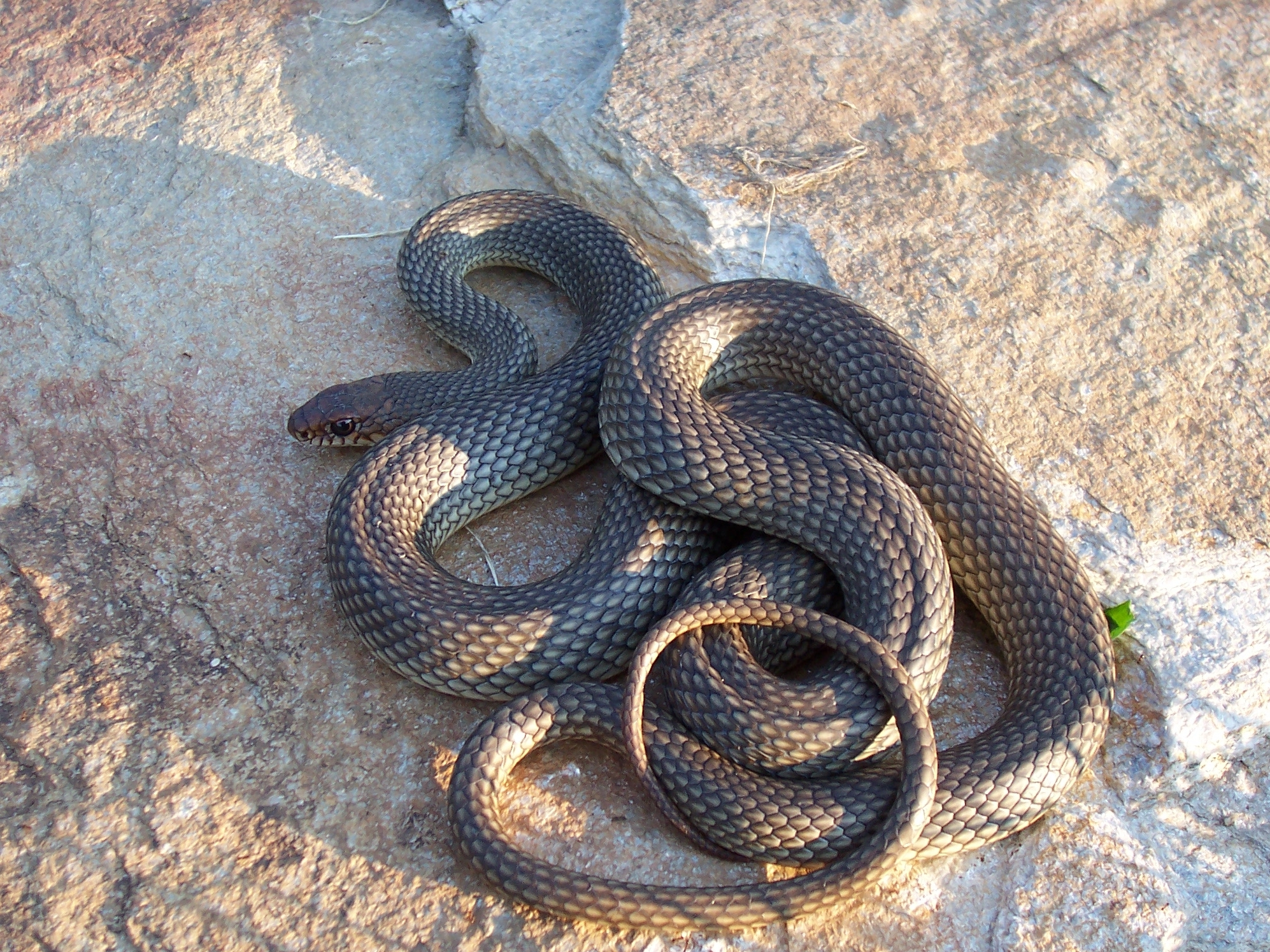

Conservation status
- Least Concern (IUCN 3.1)

Scientific classification
- Kingdom: Animalia
- Phylum: Chordata
- Class: Reptilia
- Order: Squamata
- Suborder: Serpentes
- Family: Colubridae
- Genus: Dolichophis
- Species: D. caspius

Binomial name
- Dolichophis caspius (Gmelin, 1789)

Subspecies
- D. c. caspius; D. c. eiselti

Synonyms
- See text

= Caspian whipsnake =

Species of snake

The Caspian whipsnake (Dolichophis caspius, sometimes also Coluber caspius) also known as the large whipsnake (among various other species in genus Dolichophis/Coluber), is a common species of whipsnake found in the Balkans and parts of Eastern Europe.

== Description ==
The Caspian whipsnake is perhaps the largest species of snake in Europe. It typically grows to around 140–160 cm (55–63 in) in length, though a few may exceed a length of 200 cm (79 in). The record sized specimen was approximately 250 cm (98 in) Body mass can be commonly from 120 to 673 g (4.2 to 23.7 oz). This species is not venomous and is mostly active during the day. The head is joined to the body by a thick neck. Its pupils are round. Nineteen rows of smooth scales can be found at the middle body, though rarely there may be seventeen. Dorsal scales each have two apical pits at the posterior edge. The centre of the scale is lighter in colour than the edges. The dorsal side is grey-brown and features markings which are distinctive in juveniles and young snakes but fade with age. The ventral side is light yellow or white.

== Taxonomy ==
=== Synonyms ===
Since its original description by Johann Friedrich Gmelin in 1789, D. caspius has been known by many names. A list of such synonyms is given below:

- Coluber caspius Gmelin, 1789
- Coluber acontistes Pallas, 1814
- Coluber thermalis Pallas, 1814
- Coluber jugularis caspius — Wütschert, 1984
- Hierophis caspius — Schätti, 1988
- Dolichophis caspius — Nagy et al., 2004

Nota bene: In a synonymy, names without dashes are new taxa (described as new species). However, names with dashes are just new combinations (moved to a different genus, changed from species to subspecies, etc.).

== Distribution ==
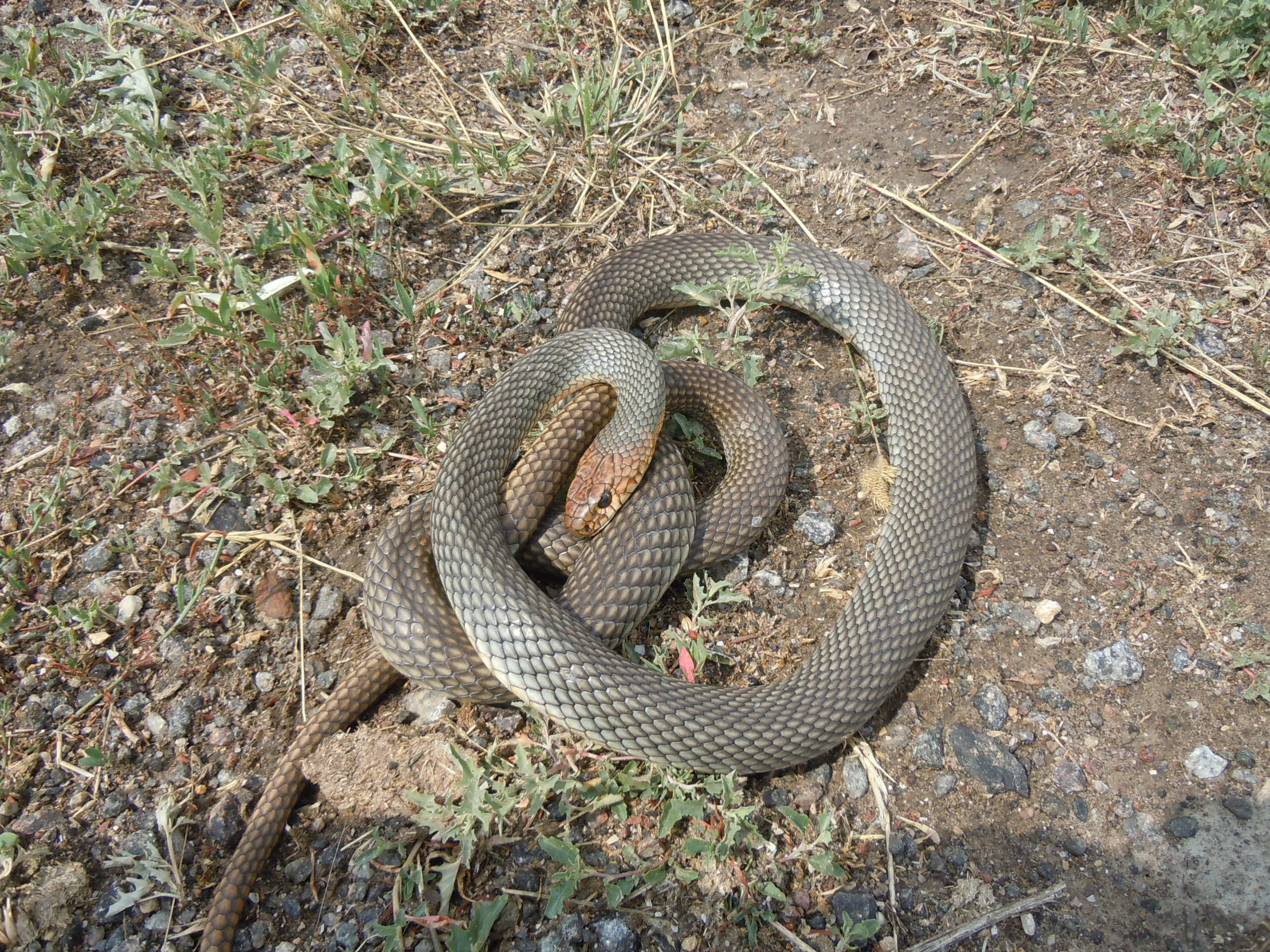
Caspian whipsnake from Ochakiv, South Ukraine

The Caspian whipsnake is found in the Balkan Peninsula, parts of Eastern Europe and a small portion of Asia Minor. It may be found in Albania, Bulgaria, Greece, North Macedonia, Serbia, Romania, Croatia, Turkey, Moldova, Montenegro, southern Ukraine, southern Russia, Kazakhstan, and southern Hungary. Results from a survey indicate their habitats may be distributed along low areas near major rivers, such as the Danube and the Olt River.

It was previously assumed extinct in Moldavia (eastern Romania, southern Ukraine, and western Moldova), where it was only known from two sites, and not observed since 1937. Three specimens were collected in May 2007 in Galați County, somewhat dispelling this belief. Though it is known to be common in the Dobrudja area, knowledge of its distribution in other areas is poor. It is believed to be very rare in these parts, and may also be highly threatened. National legislation has declared D. caspius to be "a species of community interest" and thus must be strictly protected.

In Hungary, it was formerly thought only to exist in two areas: one near the capital of Budapest, and another near Szársomlyó. However, a recent survey of the region has yielded several previously unknown whipsnake habitats along the River Danube, including sites near Dunaújváros and Dunaföldvár. As in Romania, D. caspius is a protected species in Hungary.

== Habitat ==
Recently observed specimens of D. caspius were found in grassy, open areas with sparse shrubbery. They have also been found in open, bushy areas, specifically, between the Danube Meadow and Romanian Plain, near Căscioarele. Vine covered areas were found near this habitat as well. At Drăgăneşti Olt, the species was found on a hilly slope. Its habitat also includes rocky riverbanks and swampy areas, as well as gardens and cemeteries.

== Diet ==
The Caspian whipsnake is a generalist predator and feeds on various vertebrates. Its diet may include small mammals, lizards, birds, and other snakes. Though not venomous, the Caspian whipsnake is considered "ferocious" and bites quickly and without warning. Due to its ability to consume rodents which may harm crops, it is valued as natural pest control.

== Conservation ==
Data on the conservation status of D. caspius in many regions are sparse. Whilst it is known to be common in the Dobrudja area, it may be rare and threatened in other areas. In Drăgăneşti Olt, Romania, road-killed snakes are a "common sight" to locals. Traffic-related deaths may be a cause of their decline in Romania. One of the recently observed habitats, the Romanian Plain, is known to be heavily affected by agriculture. Habitat loss to agriculture may also be a cause of the species' decline in Romania.
