= Odorrana leporipes =

Conservation status
- Data Deficient (IUCN 3.1)

Scientific classification
- Kingdom: Animalia
- Phylum: Chordata
- Class: Amphibia
- Order: Anura
- Family: Ranidae
- Genus: Odorrana
- Species: O. leporipes

Binomial name
- Odorrana leporipes (Werner, 1930)

Synonyms
- Rana leporipes Werner, 1930; Huia leporipes Werner, 1930

Species of frog

Odorrana leporipes is a species of frog in the family Ranidae. It is endemic to Guangdong province of China and only known from its type locality, "Lung Tao Shan" (=Mount Longdao) in northern Guangdong. It is only known from the original species description; the type series is presumed lost and the photographs of the holotype are now the iconotype.

== Description ==
Odorrana leporipes is a relatively large species where females can attain a snout–vent length of 102 mm (4.0 in). One male was reported to measure 93 mm (3.7 in), but it is uncertain whether its sex was correctly identified; instead it is possible that the type series consisted of females only. The body is dorsoventrally compressed. The tympanum is very distinct. The fingers and the toes have slightly enlarged discs; the toes are fully webbed. The supratympanic fold is milky white and the lip stripe is white. The dorsum is smooth with slightly distinguishable dorsolateral folds. The flanks are granular while the venter is smooth. The dorsum is dark green and the flanks are stony gray with white marbling. The legs have no banding.

== Habitat and conservation ==
The type series was collected at 700 m (2,300 ft) above sea level. This species is presumed to occur near to fast-flowing rivers and streams in montane tropical forest. Threats to it are unknown, as is its possible presence in protected areas.
