= Pristimantis affinis =

Conservation status
- Endangered (IUCN 3.1)

Scientific classification
- Kingdom: Animalia
- Phylum: Chordata
- Class: Amphibia
- Order: Anura
- Clade: Brachycephaloidea
- Family: Craugastoridae
- Genus: Pristimantis
- Species: P. affinis

Binomial name
- Pristimantis affinis (Werner, 1899)

Synonyms
- Eleutherodactylus affinis (Werner, 1899)

Species of amphibian

Pristimantis affinis is an endangered species of frog in the family Strabomantidae. It is endemic to Colombia. Its natural habitats are tropical high-altitude shrubland and grassland. It is threatened by habitat loss.
