= Craugastor laevissimus =

Conservation status
- Endangered (IUCN 3.1)

Scientific classification
- Kingdom: Animalia
- Phylum: Chordata
- Class: Amphibia
- Order: Anura
- Family: Craugastoridae
- Genus: Craugastor
- Species: C. laevissimus

Binomial name
- Craugastor laevissimus (Werner, 1896)

Species of frog

Craugastor laevissimus is a species of frog in the family Craugastoridae. It is found in Honduras and Nicaragua. Its natural habitats are lowland and sub-montane wet and moist forests; it can survive in degraded forest and secondary growth. It occurs along streams and small rivers.

Craugastor laevissimus was previously a common frog but has then declined. The reasons for the decline are not fully understood; habitat loss, chytridiomycosis, and pollution are among the possible causes of decline.
