= Andreas's racer =

Conservation status
- Least Concern (IUCN 3.1)

Scientific classification
- Kingdom: Animalia
- Phylum: Chordata
- Class: Reptilia
- Order: Squamata
- Suborder: Serpentes
- Family: Colubridae
- Genus: Dolichophis
- Species: D. andreanus

Binomial name
- Dolichophis andreanus (F. Werner, 1917)

Synonyms
- Zamenis andreana F. Werner, 1917; Coluber andreanus — Schätti & Monsch, 2004; Hierophis andreanus — Torki, 2010; Dolochophis andreanus — Rajabizadeh et al., 2020

Species of snake

Andreas's racer (Hierophis andreanus) is a species of snake in the family Colubridae. The species is native to the Middle East.

== Etymology ==
The specific name, andreanus, is in honor of "Herr Prof. Andreas " (Professor Andreas) who collected natural history specimens in Persia (now Iran) in 1905.

== Geographic range ==
D. andreanus is found in the southern Zagros Mountains and their foothills, in Fars province, Iran, and in Iraq.

== Habitat ==
The preferred natural habitats of D. andreanus are grassland and rocky areas, at altitudes of 100–3,000 m (330–9,840 ft).

== Reproduction ==
D. andreanus is oviparous.
