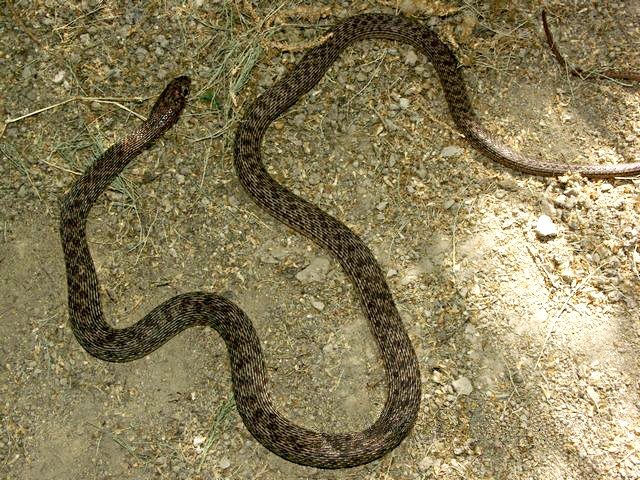

Conservation status
- Least Concern (IUCN 3.1)

Scientific classification
- Kingdom: Animalia
- Phylum: Chordata
- Class: Reptilia
- Order: Squamata
- Suborder: Serpentes
- Family: Colubridae
- Genus: Dolichophis
- Species: D. schmidti

Binomial name
- Dolichophis schmidti (Nikolsky, 1909)

Synonyms
- Coluber schmidti Nikolsky, 1909; Coluber jugularis schmidti — L. Müller, 1939; Hierophis schmidti — Schätti, 1988; Dolichophis schmidti — Nagy et al., 2004

= Dolichophis schmidti =

Species of snake

Dolichophis schmidti, known commonly as the red-bellied racer and Schmidt's whip snake, is a species of snake in the family Colubridae. The species is endemic to Western Asia.

== Geographic range ==
D. schmidti is found in the Caucasus and the Middle East, from Dagestan to Turkmenistan and south into Syria, Jordan, and northern Iran.

== Habitat ==
D. schmidti occurs in a wide variety of habitats including rocky, stony and bushy river banks, deserts, semi-deserts, rocky outcrops, hillsides, montane steppe, cultivated fields, gardens, vineyards and other rural areas, from sea level to 2,000 m (6,600 ft). It can occur close to human habitation and tolerates human disturbance.

== Diet ==
D. schmidti is often observed near to large colonies of rodents on which it preys. It also preys on lizards, birds, and snakes.

== Reproduction ==
Adult females of D. schmidti lay clutches of between 5 and 11 eggs.

== Etymology ==
The specific name, schmidti, is in honor of Russian ichthyologist Petr Yulevich Schmidt.
