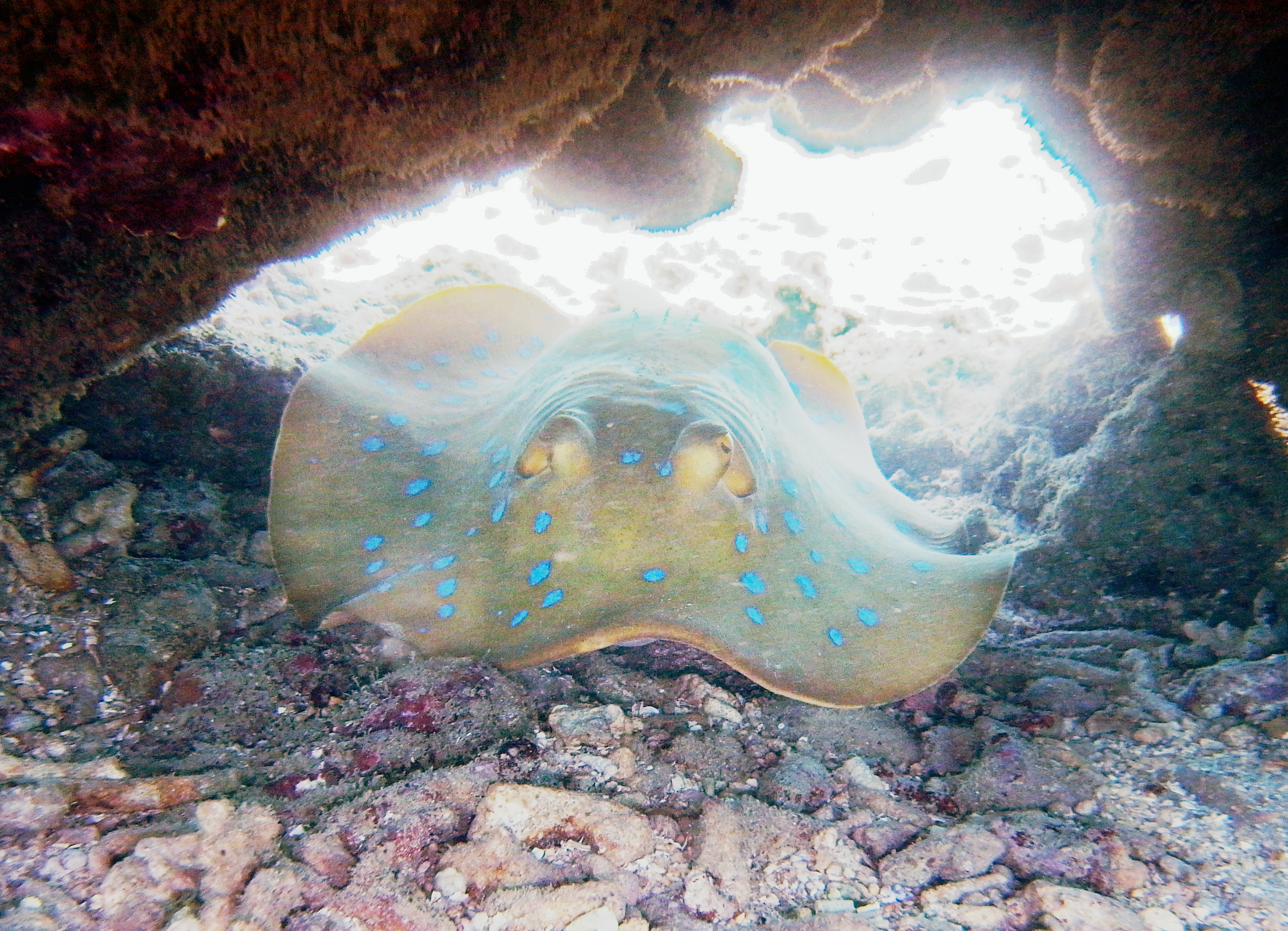

Conservation status
- Data Deficient (IUCN 3.1)

Scientific classification
- Kingdom: Animalia
- Phylum: Chordata
- Class: Chondrichthyes
- Subclass: Elasmobranchii
- Order: Myliobatiformes
- Family: Dasyatidae
- Genus: Taeniura
- Species: T. lessoni

Binomial name
- Taeniura lessoni Last, W. T. White, & Naylor, 2016

= Taeniura lessoni =

Species of fish

Taeniura lessoni, the Oceania fantail ray, is a type of ray of the family Dasyatidae found in Melanesia, including Solomon Islands and Vanuatu. It inhabits shallow coastal region of at least 18 metres (60 ft) depth and is possibly susceptible to habitat-level threats which targeted its habitat.

== Description ==
Oceania fantail ray can be distinguished by numerous characteristics, including the absence of a pair of blue-ish longitudinal stripes along the tail's sides, absence of dorsal fold but upper margin of tail with a firm ridge, relatively short post-orbital disc, and uniformly pale ventral fold. It can reach a maximum size of around 21 or 22 cm (8.3 or 8.7 in) disc width.

== Habitat and distribution ==
This species is usually found inshore, especially coral reefs habitat, in the depth of around 18 metres (60 ft). These rays have been found in Papua New Guinea, Solomon Islands, Vanuatu, and Fiji, although the distribution range might be wider.

There are no details or reports regarding Oceania fantail ray being captured by fisheries. The only possible threat to this species might be a habitat-level one, such as coral bleaching resulted by climate change.

== Etymology ==
The fish is named in honor of René Lesson (1794–1849), a French surgeon-naturalist, who once worked on the members of this genus in Melanesia, where this stingray is found.
