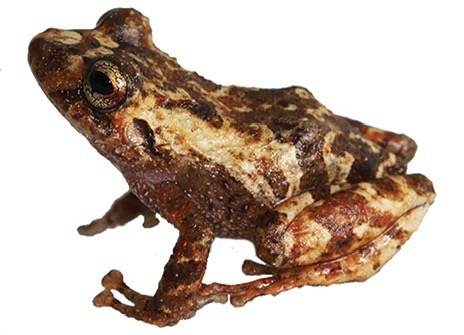

Conservation status
- Least Concern (IUCN 3.1)

Scientific classification
- Kingdom: Animalia
- Phylum: Chordata
- Class: Amphibia
- Order: Anura
- Family: Strabomantidae
- Genus: Pristimantis
- Subgenus: Pristimantis
- Species: P. frater

Binomial name
- Pristimantis frater (Werner, 1899)

Synonyms
- Hylodes frater Werner, 1899; Eleutherodactylus frater (Werner, 1899)

= Pristimantis frater =

Species of frog

Pristimantis frater is a species of frog in the family Strabomantidae. It is endemic to Colombia and occurs on the eastern slopes of the Cordillera Oriental in the Norte de Santander, Boyacá, Casanare, Cundinamarca, and Meta Departments, as well as in the Serranía de la Macarena (Meta Department). The population in the Serranía de la Macarena might represent a distinct species. Common name Meta robber frog has been coined for it.

== Description ==
Adult males measure 17–22 mm (0.7–0.9 in) and adult females, based on a single specimen, 25 mm (1.0 in) in snout–vent length. The head is as wide as the body and wider than it is long. The snout is subacuminate in dorsal view and round in lateral profile. The tympanum is prominent. The fingers have narrow lateral keels and the outer ones have also large pads. The toes have lateral keels and enlarged pads. The dorsum is pale brown with brown markings. Canthal stripe is usually absent. The venter has fine brown peppering; the throat is darker. Males have a subgular vocal sac.

== Habitat and conservation ==
Pristimantis frater occur in premontane humid forests at elevations of 800–1,600 m (2,600–5,200 ft) or 877–3,000 m (2,877–9,843 ft) above sea level, depending on the source. They can be found on low vegetation and have also been recorded from secondary forest. Reproduction is direct (i.e., without free-living larval stage).

This species is common, but it suffers from habitat loss and degradation caused primarily by agriculture (crops and cattle ranching), but also by oil exploration and road infrastructure. It has been found in areas where Batrachochytrium dendrobatidis is prevalent, but so far this species has tested negative. It is present in the Serranía de la Macarena and Tamá National Natural Parks. It might also be present in the immediately adjacent El Tamá National Park in Venezuela, but there are no records yet.
