= Bull ray (disambiguation) =

A bull ray (Aetomylaeus bovinus) is a species of large stingray of the family Myliobatidae.

Bull ray may also refer to:

- Round ribbontail ray (Taeniura meyeni)
- Australian bull ray (Myliobatis australis)
