= Pristimantis appendiculatus =

Conservation status
- Least Concern (IUCN 3.1)

Scientific classification
- Kingdom: Animalia
- Phylum: Chordata
- Class: Amphibia
- Order: Anura
- Clade: Brachycephaloidea
- Family: Craugastoridae
- Genus: Pristimantis
- Species: P. appendiculatus

Binomial name
- Pristimantis appendiculatus (Werner, 1894)

Synonyms
- Hylodes appendiculatus Werner, 1894; Eleutherodactylus appendiculatus (Werner, 1894)

Species of frog

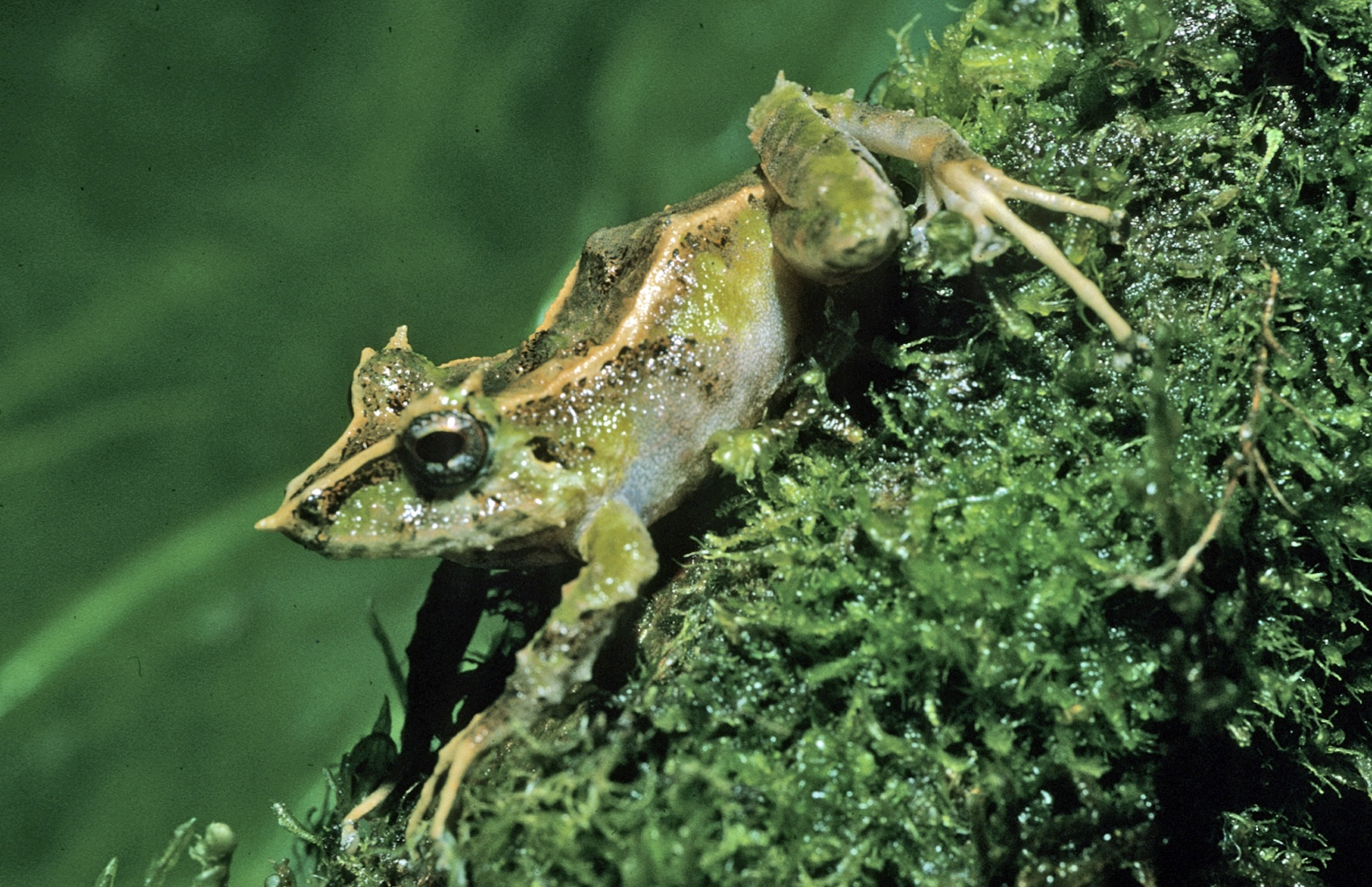
Pristimantis appendiculatus

Pristimantis appendiculatus, the Pinocchio rainfrog, is a species of frog in the family Strabomantidae. It is found on the Pacific slopes of the Andes in Ecuador and extreme southern Colombia (Colombian Massif, Nariño Department).

Pristimantis appendiculatus is common in both undisturbed and secondary habitats. Its natural habitats are montane cloud forests, but populations can survive in secondary growth with good vegetation cover. It is threatened by habitat loss caused by agricultural development, logging, and human settlement, as well as pollution from spraying illegal crops.
