= Atelopus subornatus =

Conservation status
- Critically Endangered (IUCN 3.1)

Scientific classification
- Kingdom: Animalia
- Phylum: Chordata
- Class: Amphibia
- Order: Anura
- Family: Bufonidae
- Genus: Atelopus
- Species: A. subornatus

Binomial name
- Atelopus subornatus Werner, 1899

Synonyms
- Atelopus flaviventris Werner, 1899; Atelopus echeverrii Rivero and Serna, 1985

Species of amphibian

Atelopus subornatus is a species of toad in the family Bufonidae. It is endemic to Colombia and is restricted to the Cordillera Oriental in the Cundinamarca Department. Common name Bogota stubfoot toad has been coined for this species.

== Description ==
Franz Werner described Atelopus subornatus based on three specimens (syntypes), for which the total body length was 30 mm (1.2 in). The body is relatively slim. The head is as wide as long. The fingers have only some basal webbing whereas the toes are heavily webbed. The dorsum is dark red-brown, turning to yellowish or greenish on the sides.

== Breeding ==
Atelopus subornatus breeds in streams. The egg masses are string-like, with individual embryos measuring 2–3 mm (0.079–0.118 in) and enclosed in a jelly capsule. Some jelly capsules are empty. The egg strings are not adherent but sink to the stream bottom and get caught by obstructions. The tadpoles are boldly marked with cream and black.

== Habitat and conservation ==
Atelopus subornatus inhabits both pristine and disturbed cloud forests as well as sub-páramos at elevations of 2,000–3,020 m (6,560–9,910 ft) above sea level. Breeding takes place in streams. It is threatened by chytridiomycosis as well as habitat loss caused by agricultural expansion and water pollution from pig farms.
