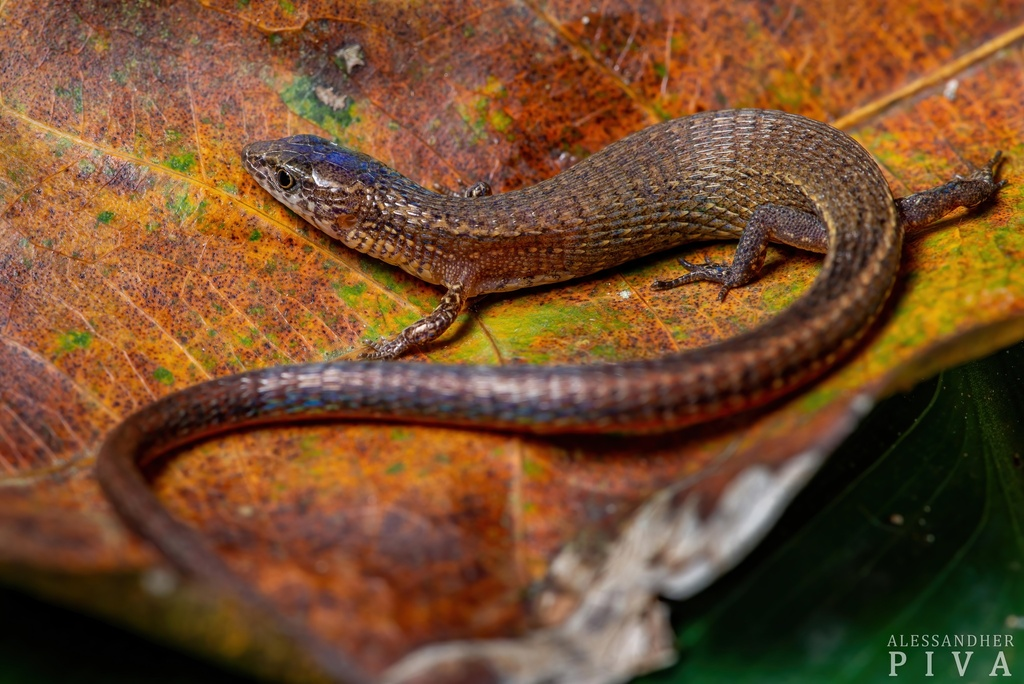

Conservation status
- Least Concern (IUCN 3.1)

Scientific classification
- Kingdom: Animalia
- Phylum: Chordata
- Class: Reptilia
- Order: Squamata
- Family: Gymnophthalmidae
- Genus: Ecpleopus; A.M.C. Duméril & Bibron, 1839
- Species: E. gaudichaudii

Binomial name
- Ecpleopus gaudichaudii A.M.C. Duméril & Bibron, 1839

Synonyms
- Arthroseps werneri Boulenger, 1898; Alopoglossus gracilis F. Werner, 1913; Arthroseps fluminensis Amaral, 1933

= Ecpleopus =

Genus of lizards

Ecpleopus is a genus of lizard in the family Gymnophthalmidae. The genus contains only one species, Ecpleopus gaudichaudii, which is endemic to Brazil.

== Etymology ==
The specific name, gaudichaudii, is in honor of French botanist Charles Gaudichaud-Beaupré.

== Geographic range ==
E. gaudichaudii is found in the Atlantic Forest in the Brazilian states of Espírito Santo, Minas Gerais, Rio de Janeiro, Santa Catarina, and São Paulo.

== Habitat ==
The preferred natural habitat of E. gaudichaudii is forest, where it lives in the leaf litter on the forest floor.

== Description ==
E. gaudichaudii may attain a snout-to-vent length (SVL) of about 5 cm (2.0 in). Its legs are short, and its tail is laterally compressed.

== Diet ==
E. gaudichaudii preys upon small invertebrates such as termites, orthopterans, and spiders.

== Reproduction ==
E. gaudichaudii is oviparous.
