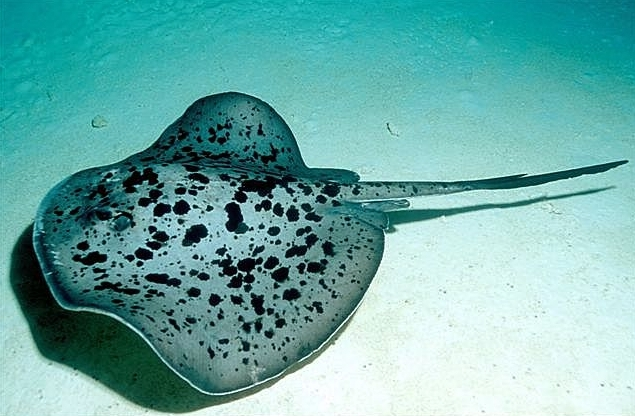
- T. meyeni

Scientific classification
- Kingdom: Animalia
- Phylum: Chordata
- Class: Chondrichthyes
- Subclass: Elasmobranchii
- Order: Myliobatiformes
- Family: Dasyatidae
- Subfamily: Dasyatinae
- Genus: Taeniurops; Garman, 1913

Type species
- Taeniura meyeni J. P. Müller & Henle, 1841

Synonyms
- Trygon Geoffroy St. Hilaire 1817

= Taeniurops =

Genus of cartilaginous fishes

Taeniurops is a genus of stingrays in the family Dasyatidae. Its two species were formerly contained within the genus Taeniura.

== Species ==
Image	Scientific name	Common name	Distribution
	Taeniurops grabata (Geoffroy St. Hilaire, 1817)	Round fantail stingray	eastern Atlantic Ocean and the southern Mediterranean Sea
	Taeniurops meyeni (J. P. Müller & Henle, 1841)	Round ribbontail ray	tropical Indo-Pacific
