= Chalcides ebneri =

Conservation status
- Critically Endangered (IUCN 3.1)

Scientific classification
- Kingdom: Animalia
- Phylum: Chordata
- Class: Reptilia
- Order: Squamata
- Family: Scincidae
- Genus: Chalcides
- Species: C. ebneri

Binomial name
- Chalcides ebneri F. Werner, 1931
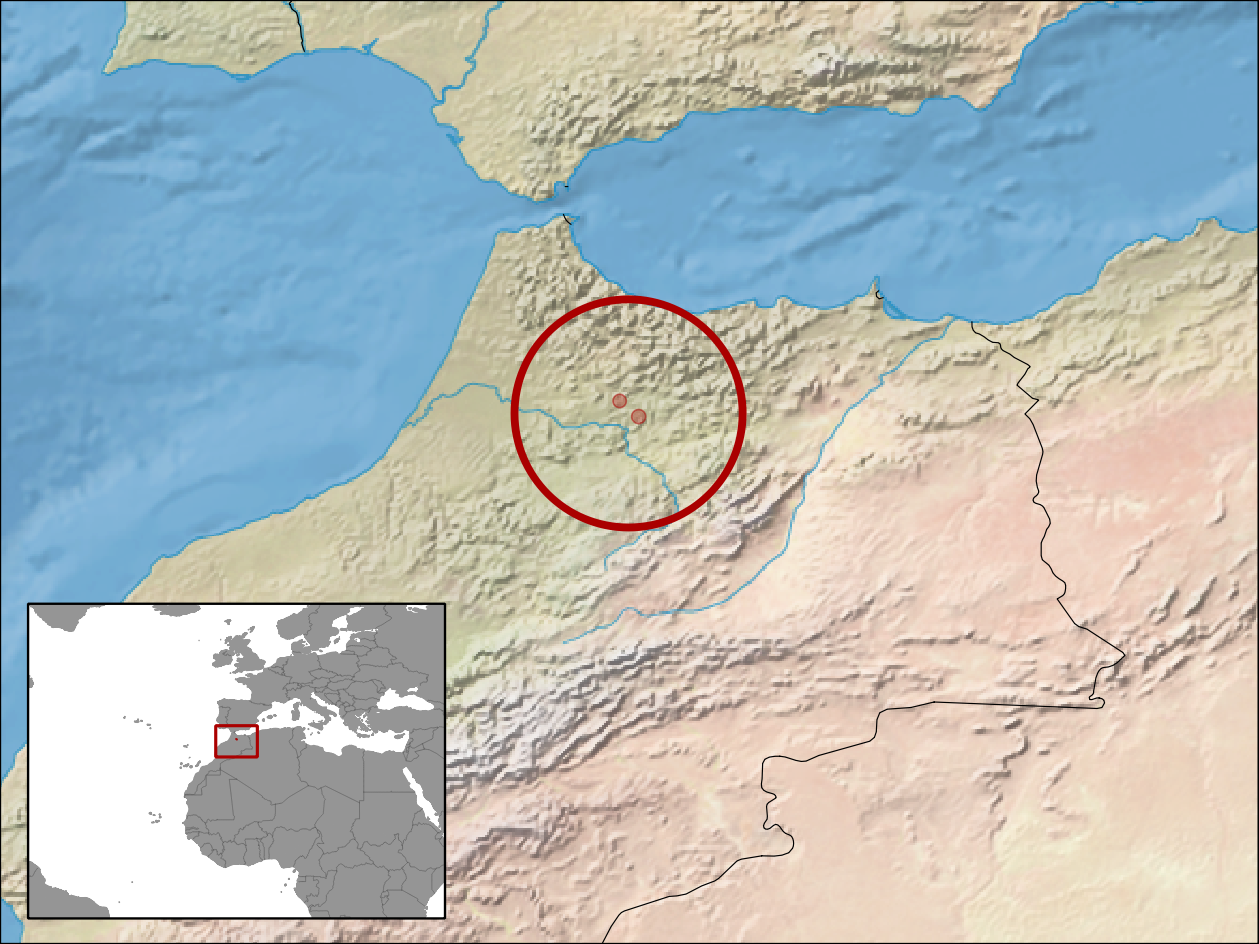

Synonyms
- Chalcides ocellatus vittatus var. ebneri F. Werner, 1931; Chalcides ebneri — G. Pasteur, 1981

Species of lizard

Chalcides ebneri, also known commonly as Ebner's cylindrical skink, is a species of lizard in the family Scincidae. The species is endemic to Morocco.

== Etymology ==
The specific name, ebneri, is in honor of Austrian entomologist Richard Ebner (1885–1961).

== Conservation status ==
C. ebneri is only found in two small locations and has not been sighted since 1970. It is threatened by some agricultural practices and habitat loss, and populations presumably continue to decline.

== Habitat ==
C. ebneri is found in rocky areas near grassy ground cover.

== Reproduction ==
The females of C. ebneri give birth to live young, by ovoviviparity.
