= Craugastor rostralis =

Conservation status
- Vulnerable (IUCN 3.1)

Scientific classification
- Kingdom: Animalia
- Phylum: Chordata
- Class: Amphibia
- Order: Anura
- Family: Craugastoridae
- Genus: Craugastor
- Species: C. rostralis

Binomial name
- Craugastor rostralis (Werner,1896)

Species of frog

Craugastor rostralis is a species of frog in the family Craugastoridae. It is found in Guatemala and Honduras. Its natural habitats are subtropical or tropical moist montane forests, plantations, and heavily degraded former forest. It is threatened by habitat loss.
