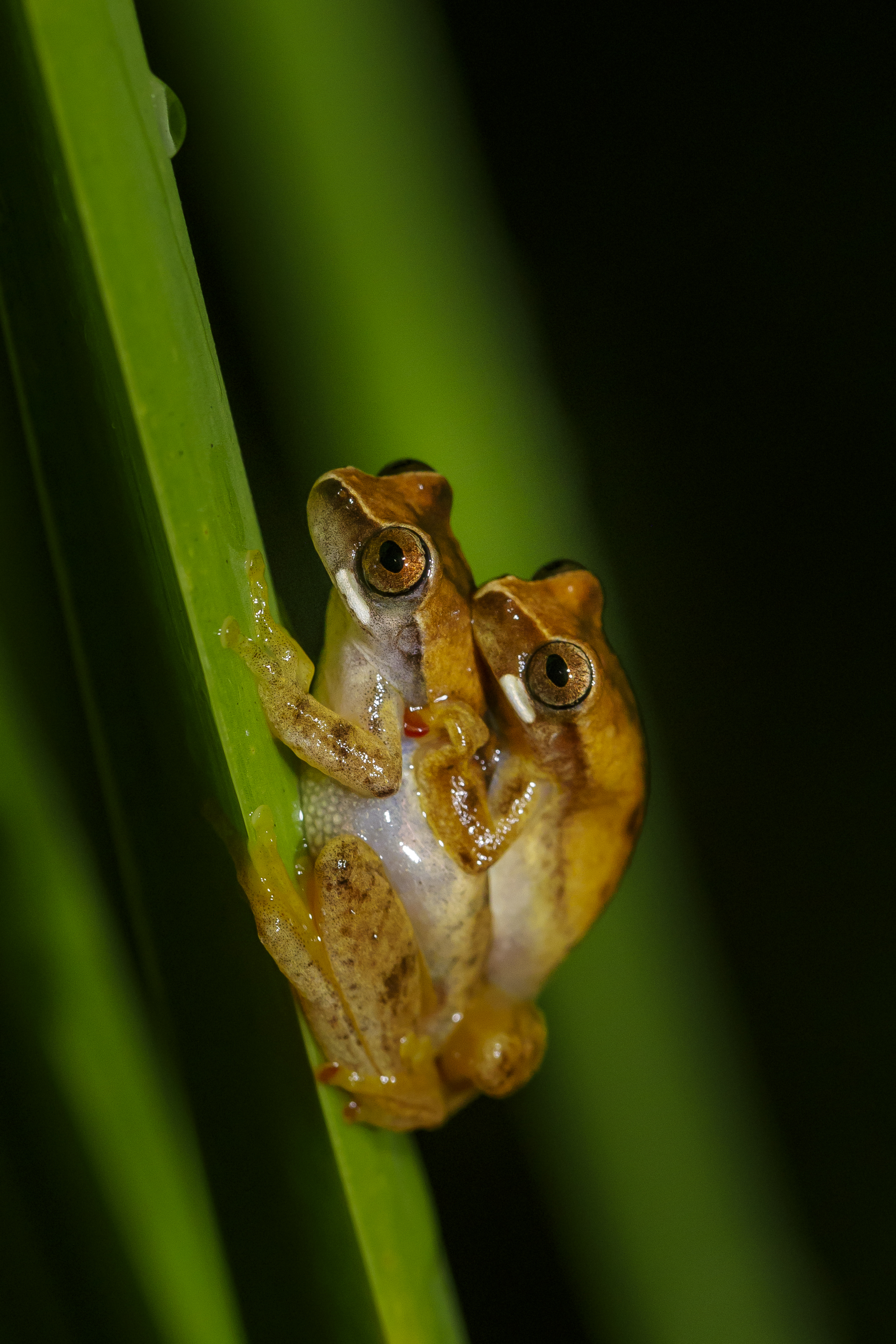

Conservation status
- Least Concern (IUCN 3.1)

Scientific classification
- Kingdom: Animalia
- Phylum: Chordata
- Class: Amphibia
- Order: Anura
- Family: Hylidae
- Genus: Dendropsophus
- Species: D. werneri

Binomial name
- Dendropsophus werneri (Cochran, 1952)

Synonyms
- Hyla pygmaea; Hyla werneri; Hyla goughi baileyi; Hyla baileyi; Hyla misera werneri; Hyla microcephala werneri; Dendropsophus werneri

= Dendropsophus werneri =

Bailey's treefrog

Species of frog

The Bailey's treefrog (Dendropsophus werneri) is a species of frog in the family Hylidae. It is endemic to southern Brazil. Its natural habitats are subtropical or tropical seasonally wet or flooded lowland grassland, swamps, freshwater marshes, intermittent freshwater marshes, pastureland, and seasonally flooded agricultural land.
