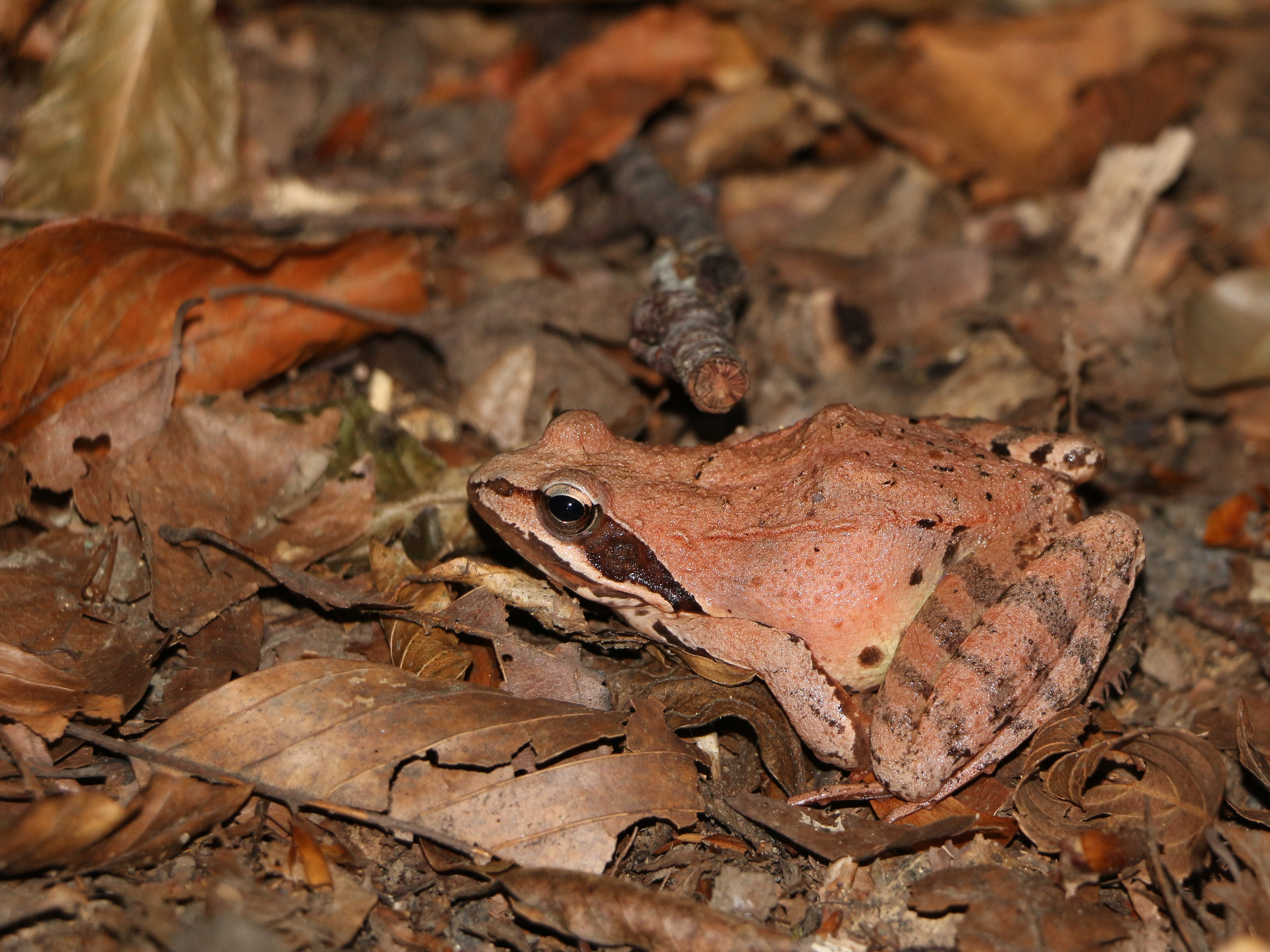

Conservation status
- Least Concern (IUCN 3.1)

Scientific classification
- Kingdom: Animalia
- Phylum: Chordata
- Class: Amphibia
- Order: Anura
- Family: Ranidae
- Genus: Rana
- Species: R. macrocnemis

Binomial name
- Rana macrocnemis Boulenger, 1885

Synonyms
- Rana camerani (Boulenger, 1886); Rana cameranoi (Boettger, 1892); Rana holtzi (Werner, 1898); Rana kisatibensis (Riabinin, 1928 "1927"); Rana macrocnermis ssp. holtzi (Veith, Kosuch, & Vences 2003); Rana temporaria ssp. warenzowi (Terentjev, 1923)

= Long-legged wood frog =

Species of amphibian

The long-legged wood frog (Rana macrocnemis), also known as Caucasus frog, Brusa frog, or Uludağ frog, is a species of frog in the family Ranidae found in Armenia, Azerbaijan, Georgia, Iran, Russia, Turkey, and Turkmenistan.

Its natural habitats are boreal forests, temperate forests, temperate shrubland, subtropical or tropical dry shrubland, temperate grassland, rivers, intermittent rivers, swamps, freshwater lakes, intermittent freshwater lakes, freshwater marshes, intermittent freshwater marshes, freshwater springs, rocky areas, arable land, pastureland, plantations, rural gardens, urban areas, water storage areas, ponds, and introduced vegetation. It is not considered threatened by the IUCN.
