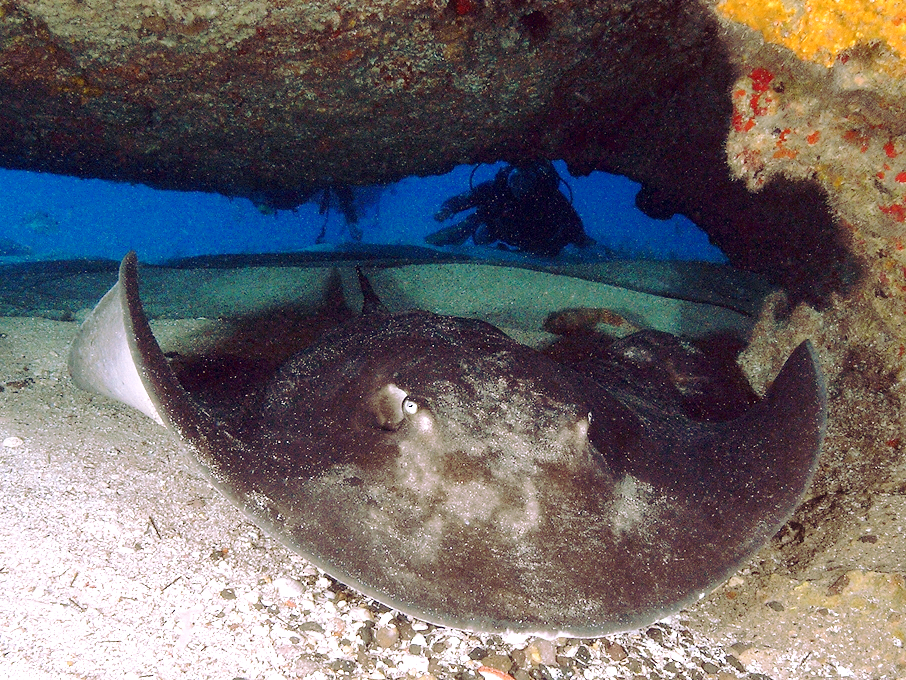

Conservation status
- Near Threatened (IUCN 3.1)

Scientific classification
- Kingdom: Animalia
- Phylum: Chordata
- Class: Chondrichthyes
- Subclass: Elasmobranchii
- Order: Myliobatiformes
- Family: Dasyatidae
- Genus: Taeniurops
- Species: T. grabatus

Binomial name
- Taeniurops grabatus (É. Geoffroy Saint-Hilaire, 1817)
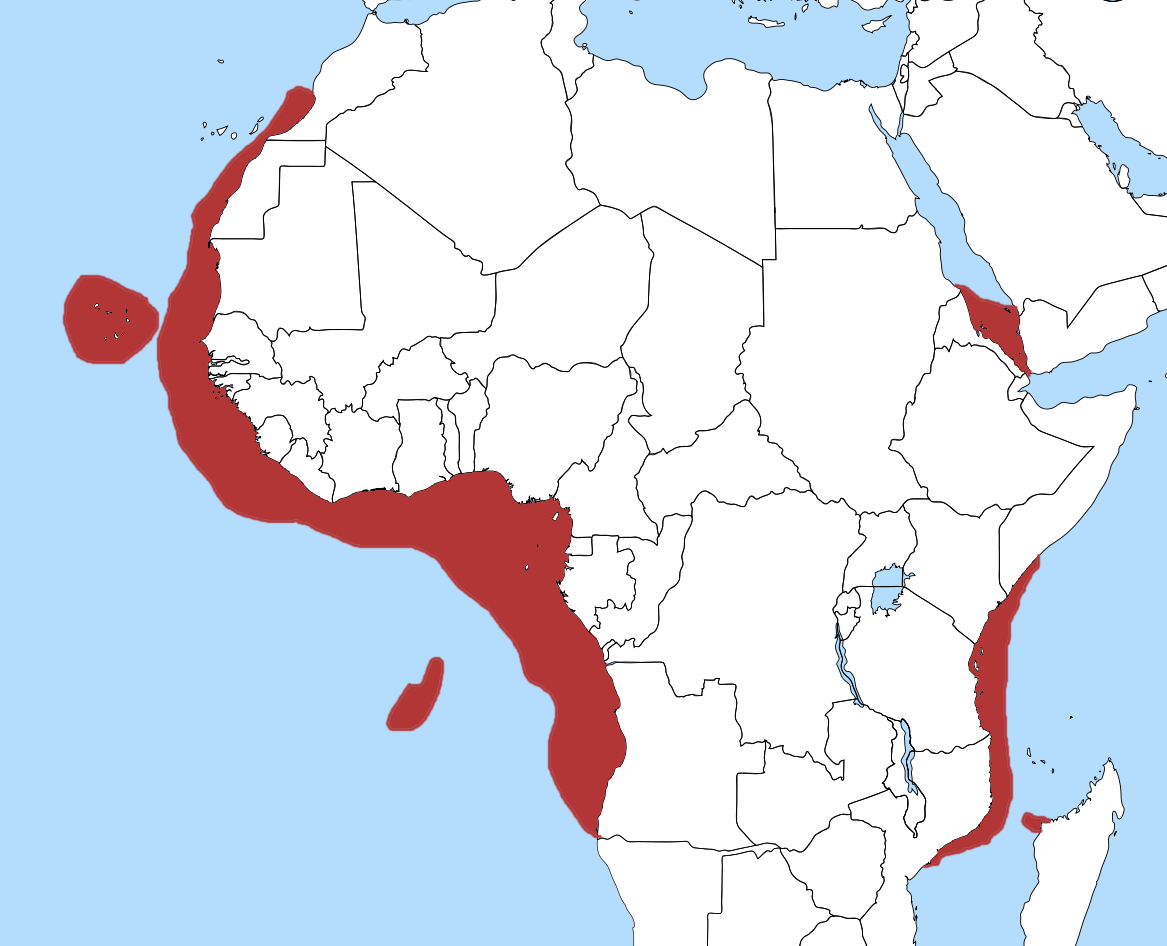
- Distribution of the round fantail stingray

Synonyms
- Trygon grabatus (Geoffroy Saint-Hilaire, 1817); Taeniurops grabata (Geoffroy Saint-Hilaire, 1817); Taeniura grabata (Geoffroy Saint-Hilaire, 1817)

= Round fantail stingray =

Species of cartilaginous fish

The round fantail stingray (Taeniurops grabatus) or round stingray, is a poorly known species of stingray in the family Dasyatidae. It inhabits sandy, muddy, or rocky coastal habitats in the eastern Atlantic Ocean and the southern Mediterranean Sea. This dark-colored ray typically reaches a width of 1 m (3.3 ft), and can be identified by its nearly circular pectoral fin disk, short tail, and mostly bare skin. The round fantail stingray hunts for fishes and crustaceans on the sea floor, and exhibits an aplacental viviparous mode of reproduction. The International Union for Conservation of Nature (IUCN) has assessed the conservation status of this species as Near Threatened.

== Taxonomy ==
French naturalist Étienne Geoffroy Saint-Hilaire originally described the round fantail stingray in 1817 as Trygon grabatus, from the Latin grabatus meaning "bed". His account was published in the first volume of the folio Poissons du Nil, de la mer Rouge et de la Méditerranée. Subsequent authors moved this species to the genus Taeniura. No type specimens are known.

== Distribution and habitat ==
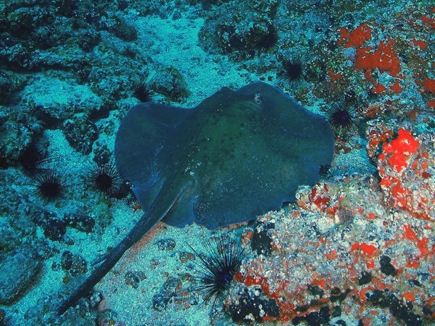
A round fantail stingray off Tenerife in the Canary Islands

The round fantail stingray is found on the tropical to subtropical waters of the eastern Atlantic from Mauritania to Angola, as well as off the Canary Islands, Madeira, and Cape Verde. This species in the Mediterranean Sea is occasionally sighted and appears to be frequent in the Gulf of Gabes and in Levantine waters. However, it cannot be considered a Lessepsian migrants, as reports of this species being present in the Red Sea appear erroneous. Found at depths of 10–300 m (33–984 ft), the round fantail stingray favors coastal sandy, muddy, or rocky areas.

== Description ==
The round fantail stingray has a nearly circular pectoral fin disk slightly wider than long. The tail measures no longer than the disk length and bears one or more stinging spines on the upper surface. The spines average 50 mm (2.0 in) long in males and 66 mm (2.6 in) in females, and have a central groove and 29–45 lateral serrations. Replacement spines grow in front of the primary spine. There is a deep fin fold running beneath the tail from the level of the spine almost to the tip. The skin is mostly smooth, save for small dermal denticles found along the middle of the back from the spiracles to the tail spine, as well as three thorns on the "shoulders". The coloration is dark gray to brown to olive above, with various darker mottling, and off-white below. This species typically grows up to 1 m (3.3 ft) across and 1.5 m (4.9 ft) long, though it has been reported to a length of 2.5 m (8.2 ft). It can weigh as much as 150 kg (330 lb).

== Biology and ecology ==
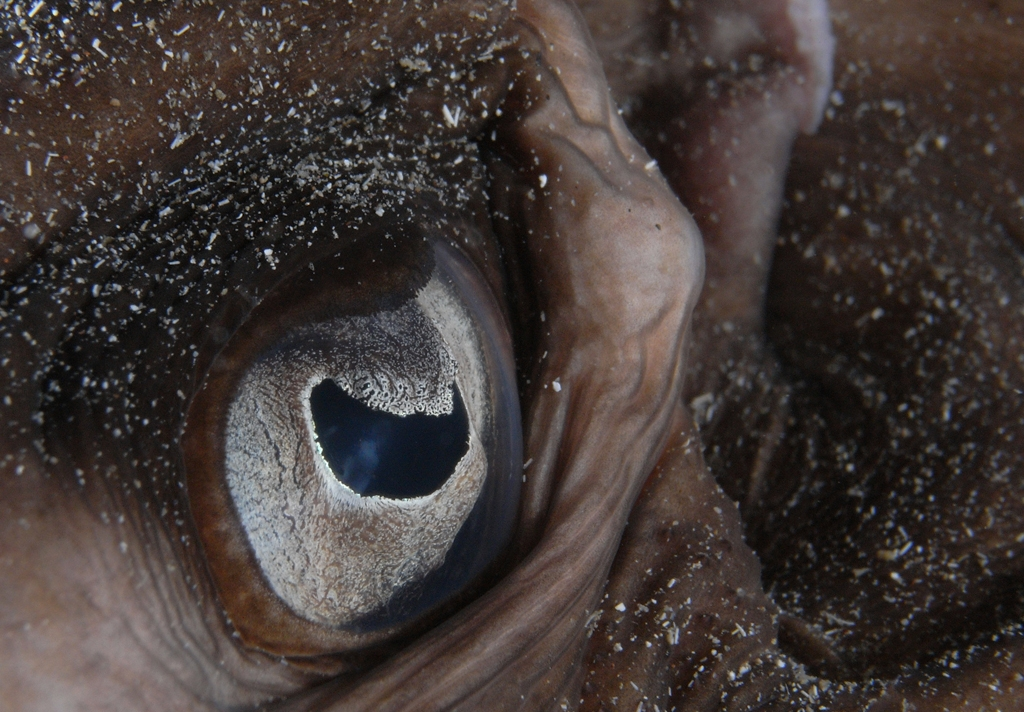
The eye of a round fantail stingray, with the large spiracle behind

Little is known of the natural history of the round fantail stingray. A predator of bottom-dwelling crustaceans and fishes, during the day this species can often be found partially buried in sediment, under ledges, or lying in the open spaces between reefs. Known parasites of the round fantail stingray include the monogeneans Dendromonocotyle taeniurae and Neoentobdella apiocolpos, which infest the skin, and Heterocotyle forcifera, H. mokhtarae, and H. striata, which infest the gills, and the tapeworm Rhinebothrium monodi, which infests the spiral valve intestine. It has been observed being attended to by the cleaner shrimp Hippolysmata grabhami. Like other stingrays, this species is aplacental viviparous.

== Human interactions ==
Potential threats to the round fantail stingray are commercial fisheries utilizing bottom trawls and trammel nets, but no specific data on utilization or population impact are available. Therefore, the International Union for Conservation of Nature (IUCN) has listed this species as Near Threatened. It has been observed sheltering near artificial reefs in the Canary Islands.
