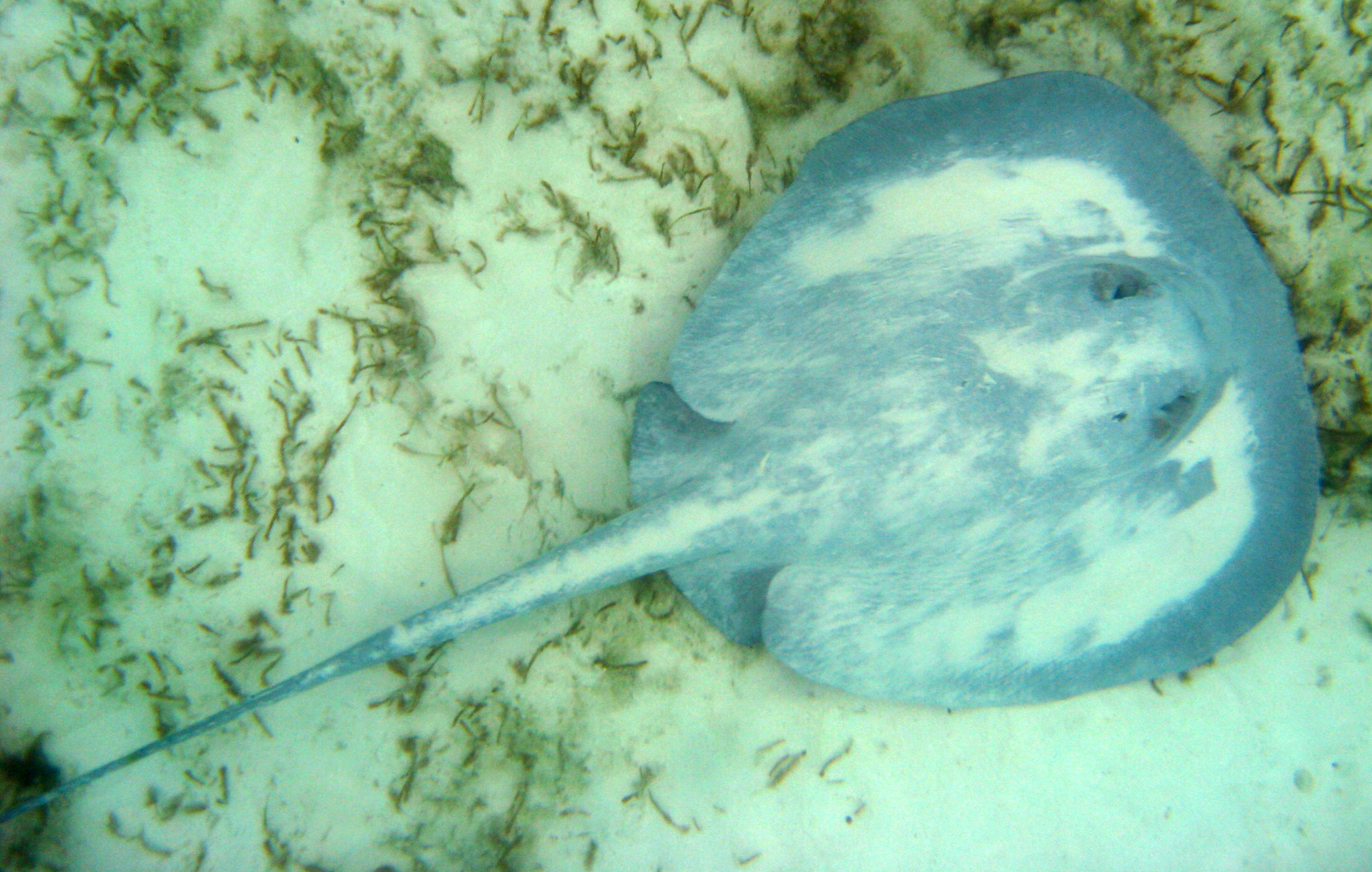

Conservation status
- Endangered (IUCN 3.1)

Scientific classification
- Kingdom: Animalia
- Phylum: Chordata
- Class: Chondrichthyes
- Subclass: Elasmobranchii
- Order: Myliobatiformes
- Family: Potamotrygonidae
- Genus: Styracura
- Species: S. schmardae

Binomial name
- Styracura schmardae (Werner, 1904)

Synonyms
- Himantura schmardae (Werner, 1904); Trygon schmardae Werner, 1904

= Chupare stingray =

Species of cartilaginous fish

The chupare stingray or Caribbean whiptail stingray (Styracura schmardae) is a species of stingray in the family Potamotrygonidae, found in the western Atlantic Ocean from the Gulf of Campeche to Brazil, including the Antilles. The presence of this species in the Gulf of Mexico has not been confirmed. It also occurs in the Bahamas. It usually inhabits sandy substrates, sometimes near coral reefs, and is an infrequent visitor to the Amazon River estuary. Leonard Compagno doubted the taxonomic validity of this species in his 1999 Checklist of Living Elasmobranchs.

== Description ==
This is a large species with a maximum reported disk width of two meters (6.6 ft). It has an oval pectoral fin disk with a long, broad-angled snout; the front margin of the disk is almost straight. The mouth is arched with indentations at the symphysis and five papillae on the floor. The teeth have elliptical bases and flattened cusps with a scallop-edged central depression. The upper jaw contains 28-36 rows of teeth. The tail is relatively short and slender, without fin folds but having subtle ventral and lateral ridges towards the base. There is a single saw-toothed spine located on the latter half of the tail. The upper surface of the body and tail are covered with small tubercles; there are large tubercles with four radiating ridges each on the shoulder region. The coloration is dark brown to olive above and yellowish white below, darkening to blackish towards the tip of the tail.

== Taxonomy ==
The chupare stingray is believed to be the sister species of the Pacific chupare (S. pacifica), which is morphologically similar and shares the four-ridged shoulder tubercles. These two species are together known as the "amphi-American Himantura". Based on the details of the mandibular musculature and articulation, the amphi-American Himantura are hypothesized to be the closest relatives of the river stingrays (family Potamotrygonidae), rather than to Indo-Pacific Himantura species. This has given rise to the theory that both the amphi-American Himantura and the river stingrays are descended from euryhaline ancestors living along the northern coast of South America prior to the formation of the Isthmus of Panama. This interpretation was initially controversial, as parasitological evidence suggests that the river stingrays are most closely related to Pacific round rays in the genus Urobatis. In 2016, a major review of "Himantura" based on morphology and molecular evidence confirmed the position of the chupare stingray, and it was moved to the genus Styracura (together with the Pacific chupare) in the family Potamotrygonidae.

== Behavior and fishing ==
This species is not common and almost nothing is known of its biology or habits. It is reported to be ovoviviparous, like other stingrays. Known parasites of this species include the nematode Echinocephalus daileyi and the cestode Anindobothrium anacolum. The chupare stingray is taken as bycatch by artisanal and commercial fisheries using nets and hook-and-line, and also serves as a subsistence food source. In addition to its meat, which is marketed salted, this species is also used to produce gelatin and oil.
