= Garman New Guinea tree frog =

Conservation status
- Data Deficient (IUCN 3.1)

Scientific classification
- Kingdom: Animalia
- Phylum: Chordata
- Class: Amphibia
- Order: Anura
- Family: Hylidae
- Genus: "Litoria"
- Species: "L." jeudii

Binomial name
- "Litoria" jeudii (Werner, 1901)

Species of amphibian

The Garman New Guinea tree frog ("Litoria" jeudii) is a species of frog in the subfamily Pelodryadinae.

This species is endemic to Papua New Guinea, and the type is the only known specimen.

The specific epithet honors the Dutch zoologist Theodoor Gerard van Lidth de Jeude. The vernacular name is almost certainly a meaningless error, for "German New Guinea tree frog".
