= Zoo Basel =

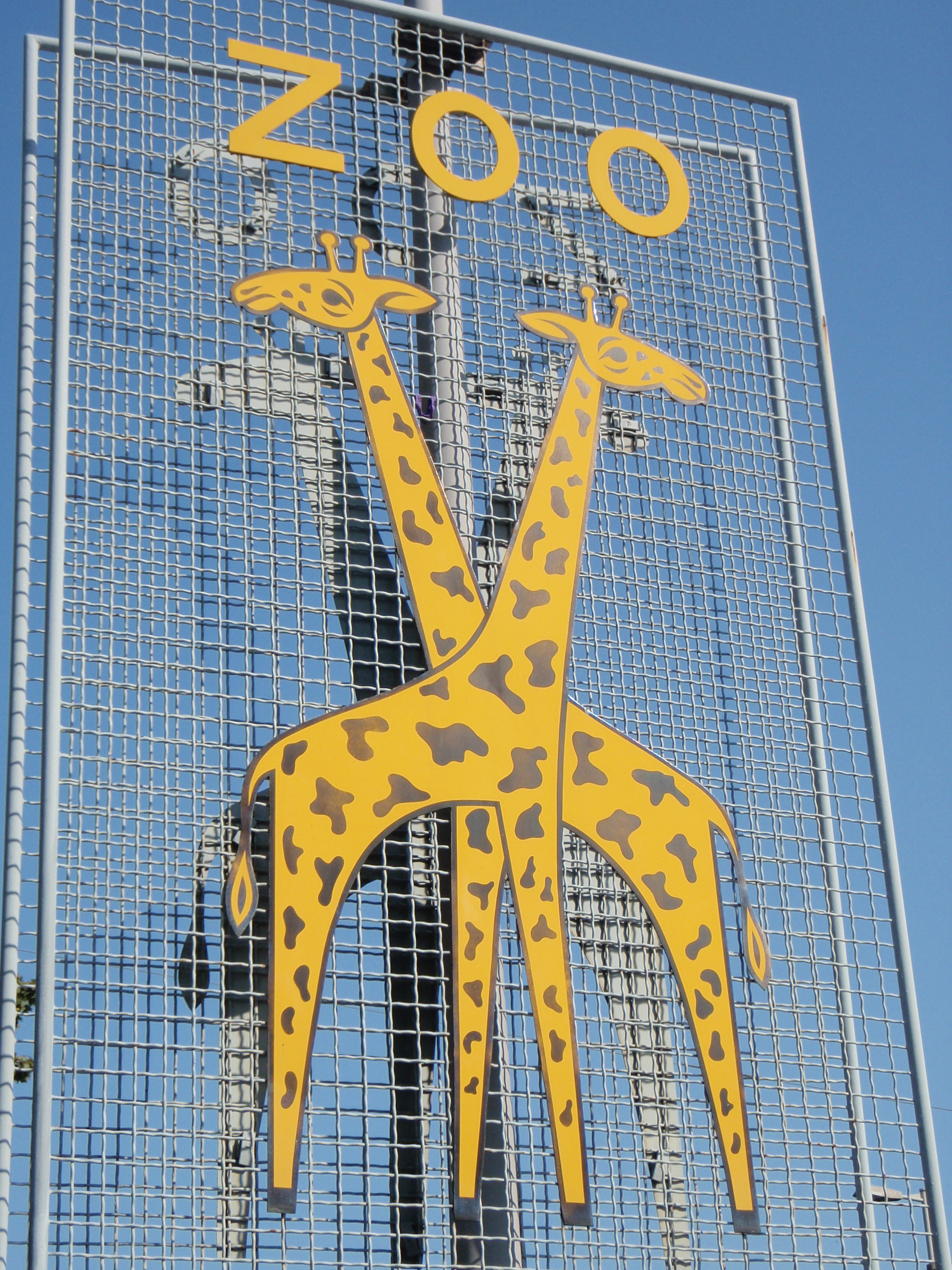
- Zoo Basel logo
- Interactive map of Zoo Basel
- 47°32′50″N 7°34′44″E
- Date opened: July 3, 1874
- Location: Basel, Switzerland
- Land area: 32.12 acres (13.00 ha)
- No. of animals: 11,393 (Dec. 31, 2024)
- No. of species: 602 (Dec. 31, 2024)
- Annual visitors: 1,226,274 (2024)
- Memberships: 20 organizations, including EAZA, WAZA, and zooschweiz/zoosuisse
- Major exhibits: Africa, Antelope House, Aquarium, Australia, Bird House, Elephant and Tembea Enclosure, Etoscha, Gamgoas, Kinderzoo, Monkey House, and Rhino Exhibit in the Sautergarden (Asian Section), Seal/Sea Lion Pool, Flamingo
- Website: www.zoobasel.ch

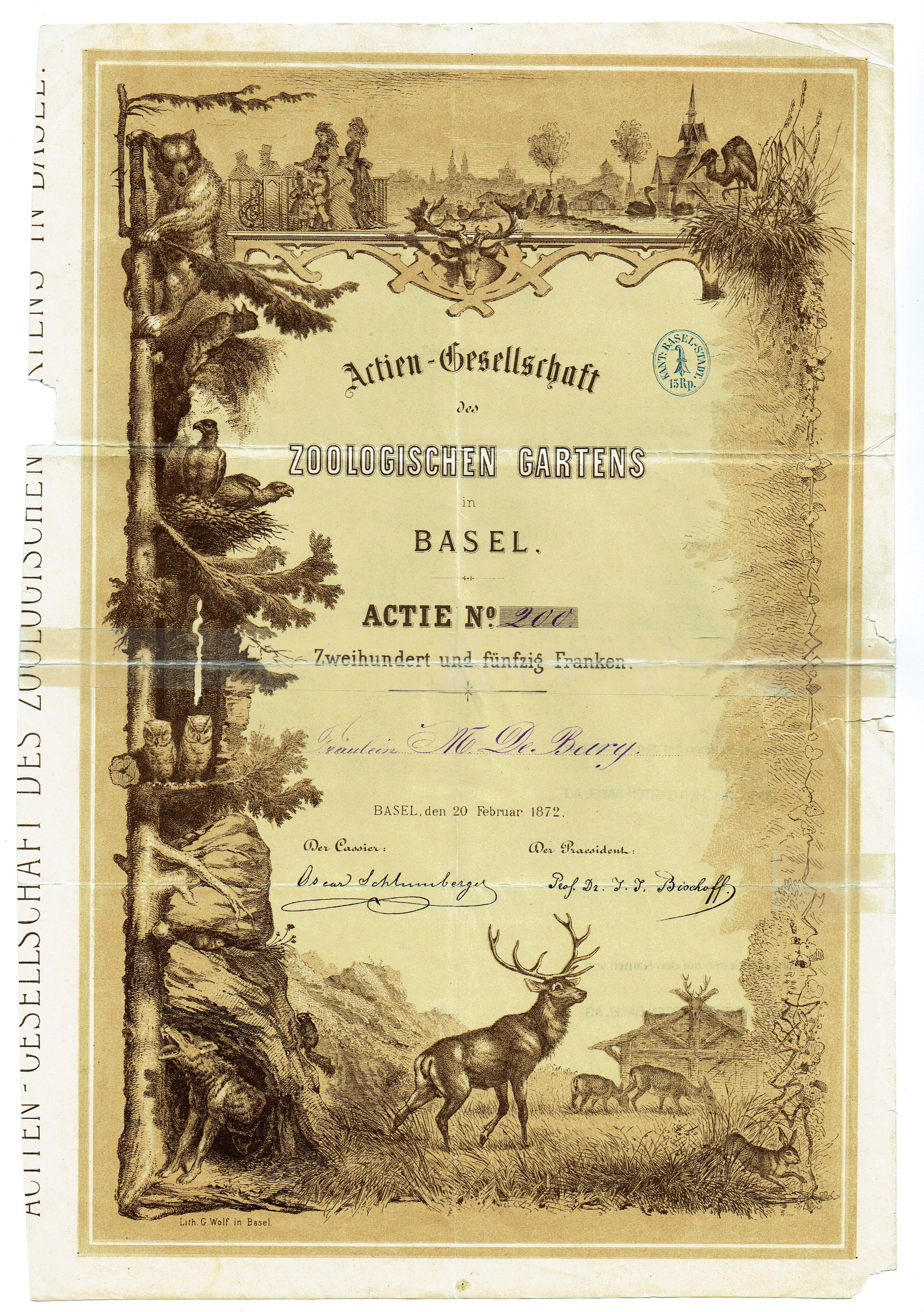
Share of the AG des zoologischen Gartens in Basel, issued 20. February 1872

Zoo Basel is a zoological garden in the city of Basel, Switzerland. Its official name is Zoologischer Garten Basel — or in English: Basel Zoological Garden. Basel residents affectionately call it Zolli. Its main entrance is just outside Basel's city centre and extends in the Birsig stream valley to Basel's city border with Binningen, Basel-Country. The zoo has over 500 animal species from all seven continents.

Zoo Basel is Switzerland's oldest (1874) and largest zoo by number of animals. In 2024 it got over 1.2 million visitors.

Zoo Basel was ranked as one of the fifteen best zoos in the world by Forbes Traveler in 2008 and in 2009 as the seventh best in Europe by Anthony Sheridan from the Zoological Society of London.

The zoo had the first Indian rhinoceros birth in a zoo, as well as the first greater flamingo hatch. It has had repeated breeding success with animals including cheetahs (18 births), okapi (22), pygmy hippopotamuses (53), and flamingos (over 400 hatches). Every Somali wild ass (a donkey) in zoos worldwide is related to the population in Basel, where this species' zoological breeding program was started. The zoo is currently engaged in more than 40 conservation breeding programs for endangered species.

Zoo Basel is undergoing the most expensive expansion in its history. These include the indoor and outdoor renovation of the monkeyhouse (2011–2012 / Fr. 30 millions), the zoo restaurant renovation/expansion (2015 / Fr. 16 millions) and a new elephant house and outdoor exhibit (2016 / Fr. 28 millions). In the near future, further expansions into the current parking lot and to the south are planned. Basel Zoo is implementing a master plan starting from late 2024. This initiative is called "Zolli 2049".

== Exhibits and attractions ==
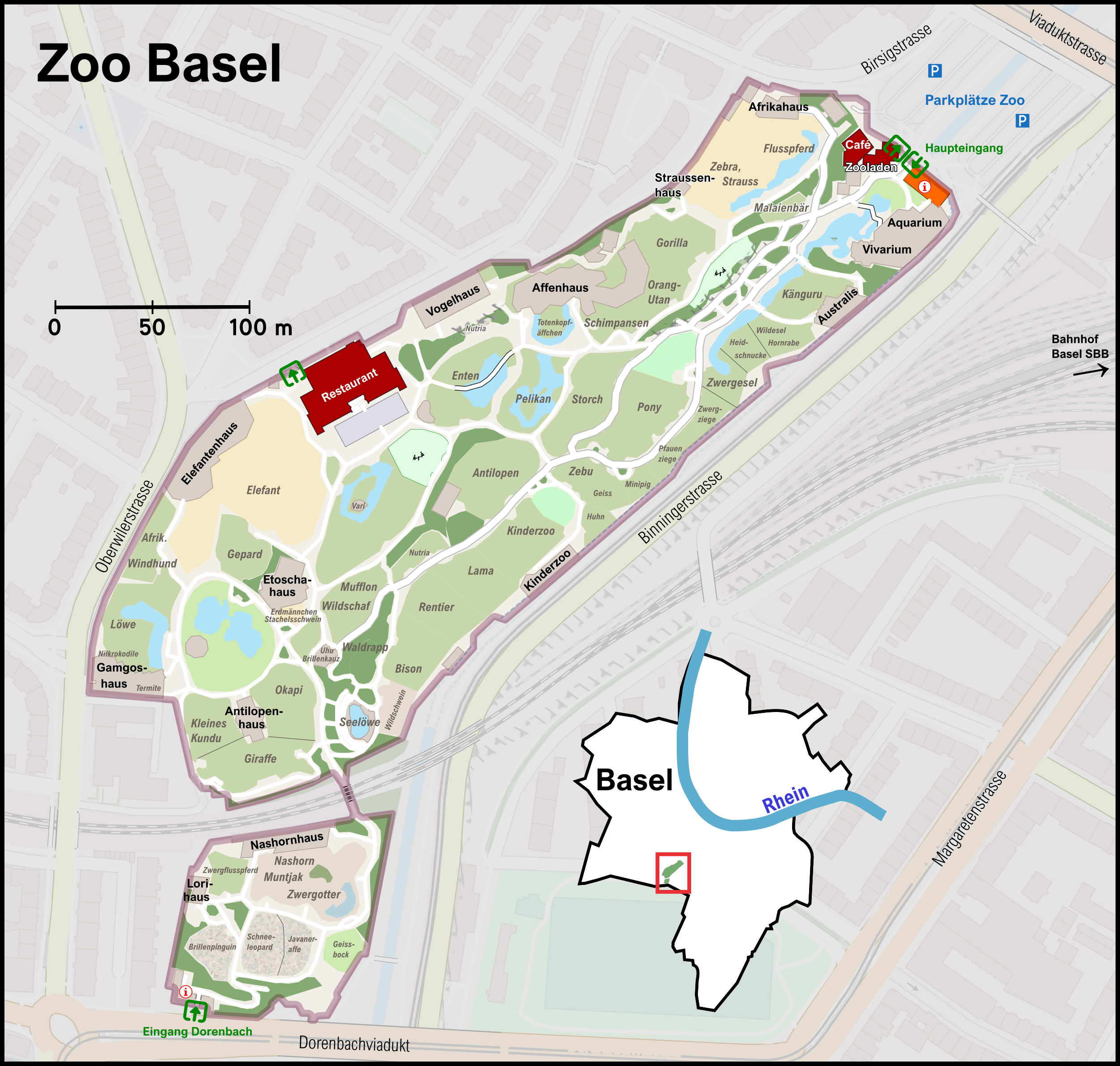
Map of Zoo Basel

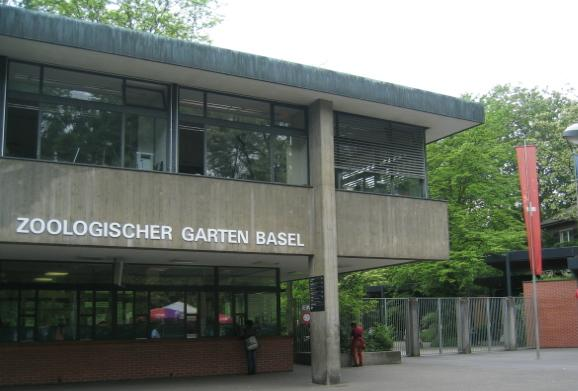
Zoo Basel's main entrance

Zoo Basel is surrounded by the city of Basel and has a similar role to the local population as does the Central Park in New York City for the city's residents. According to Zoo Basel, its "exhibits are designed not to reveal everything at the first glance and are planned to invite visitors to stop and make personal observations."

Listed below are some of Zoo Basel's exhibits. Note, however, that exhibits continually change due to infrastructure upgrades, breeding successes, and the construction of new exhibits.

=== Aquarium ===
The aquarium (called Vivarium in Basel) was opened in 1972 and has had several notable breeding successes through the years. These include lungfish bichir offspring in 2006, repeated king penguin hatches, and over a thousand hatches of the red-bellied short-necked turtle since 1981.

As of May 2012, there were about 6,000 animals in the Vivarium in 480 species, including fish, reptiles, amphibians, gentoo penguins, and king penguins.

During the winter months, the gentoo and king penguins have access to an outdoor area and can be observed walking from the Vivarium to it every morning around eleven.

=== Africa exhibit ===
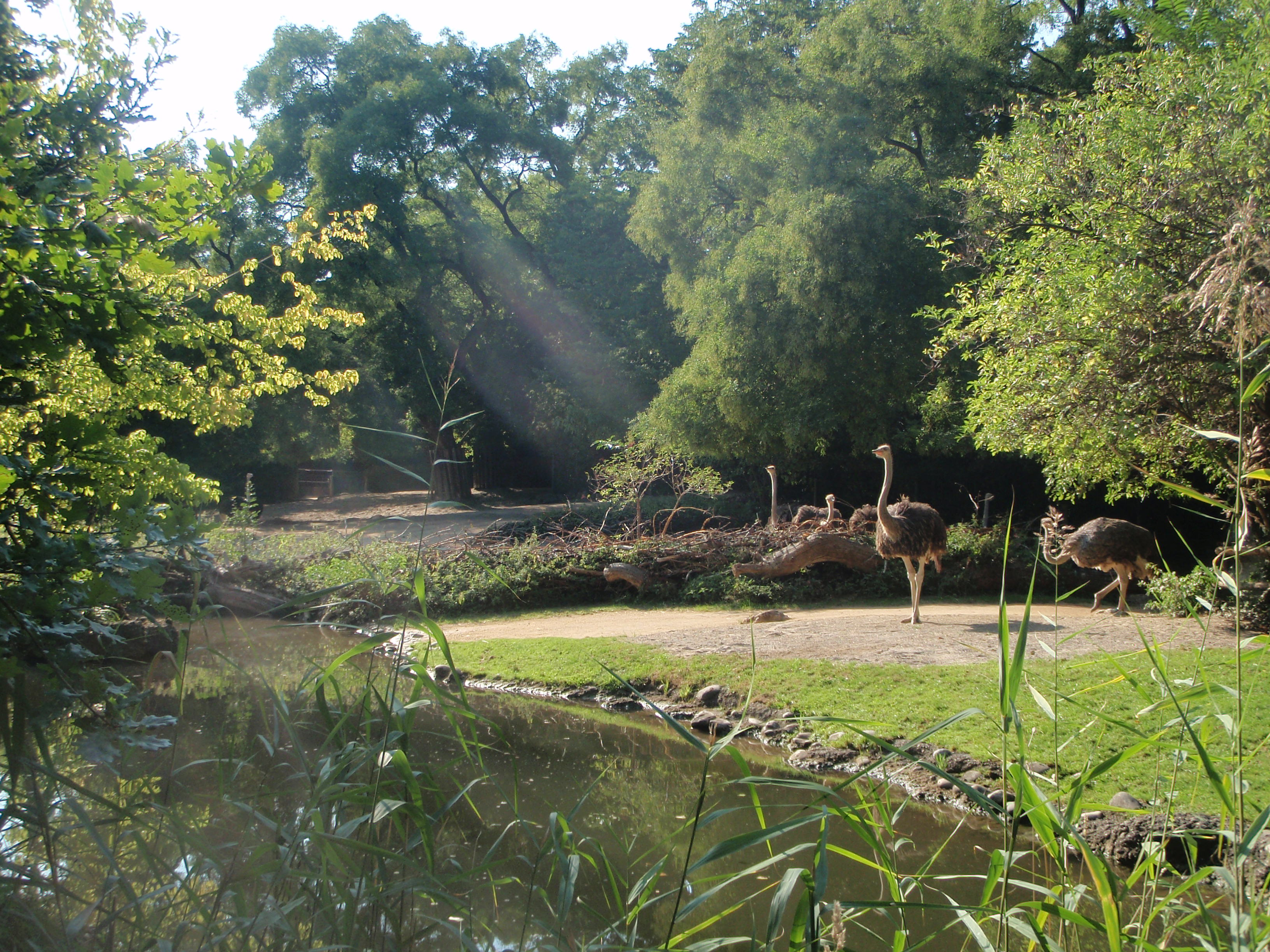
Africa exhibit

Hippos, ostriches, and zebras (Grant's zebra) live together in the Africa exhibit.

The Africa exhibit was Zoo Basel's first in which three species share the same outdoor area. According to the zoo, experiences gained in this exhibit helped shape the Etosha theme area and the rhinoceros outdoor exhibit.

It was completed in 1993 and has been scene of several accidents. On October 13, 2004, after twelve years of living together, the 17-year-old zebra stallion bit the hippo male during its daily morning territory marking, the zebra fell into the water, and was killed by the hippos in front of several visitors.

On February 13, 2013, Zoo Basel reported that the ostrich couple Baringo (b. 1993) and Manyara (b. 1992) had yet another ten chicks. According to its webpage, Zoo Basel "is especially proud that the ostrich parents are very successfully natural breeders." While Manyara was sitting on the eggs during the day, Baringo took over the night shifts. Without human breeding help, about 110 ostriches have hatched in Basel since 2000.

=== Australis ===
Zoo Basel first acquired kangaroos in 1908. Since then, over a hundred kangaroos have been born. In 2006, the theme area Australis was opened, funded by Novartis. In this outdoor exhibit, western grey kangaroos and Australian brush-turkeys live together. Inside the Australis house are several vivaria exhibiting Australian animals, including geckos, redback spiders, cane toads, several species of Phasmatodeas (or stick insects), and green tree pythons. An educational exhibit inside the house focuses on marsupial reproduction.

=== Bird house ===
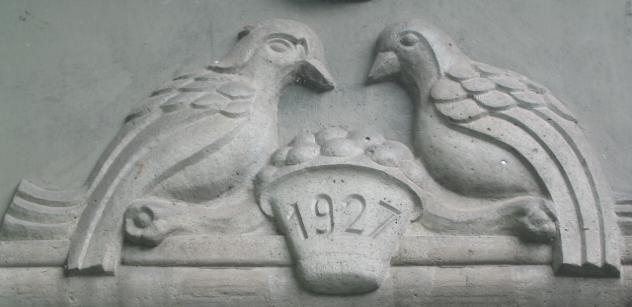
Bird House entrance logo

The Bird House opened in 1927 and is the second oldest building in Zoo Basel. While in the early days this house used to have reptiles and monkeys, it now has only birds.

The 'jungle' in the center of the bird house has free-flying birds, who can hide in the thick vegetation. Some like the Knysna turaco can be heard but are only visible in flight.

Since 1948 the zoo has hosted birds belonging to the Zosteropidae bird family. The small montane white-eye bird, that belongs to this family, came in 2008 again to Basel, after 20 years of absence.

=== Etosha ===
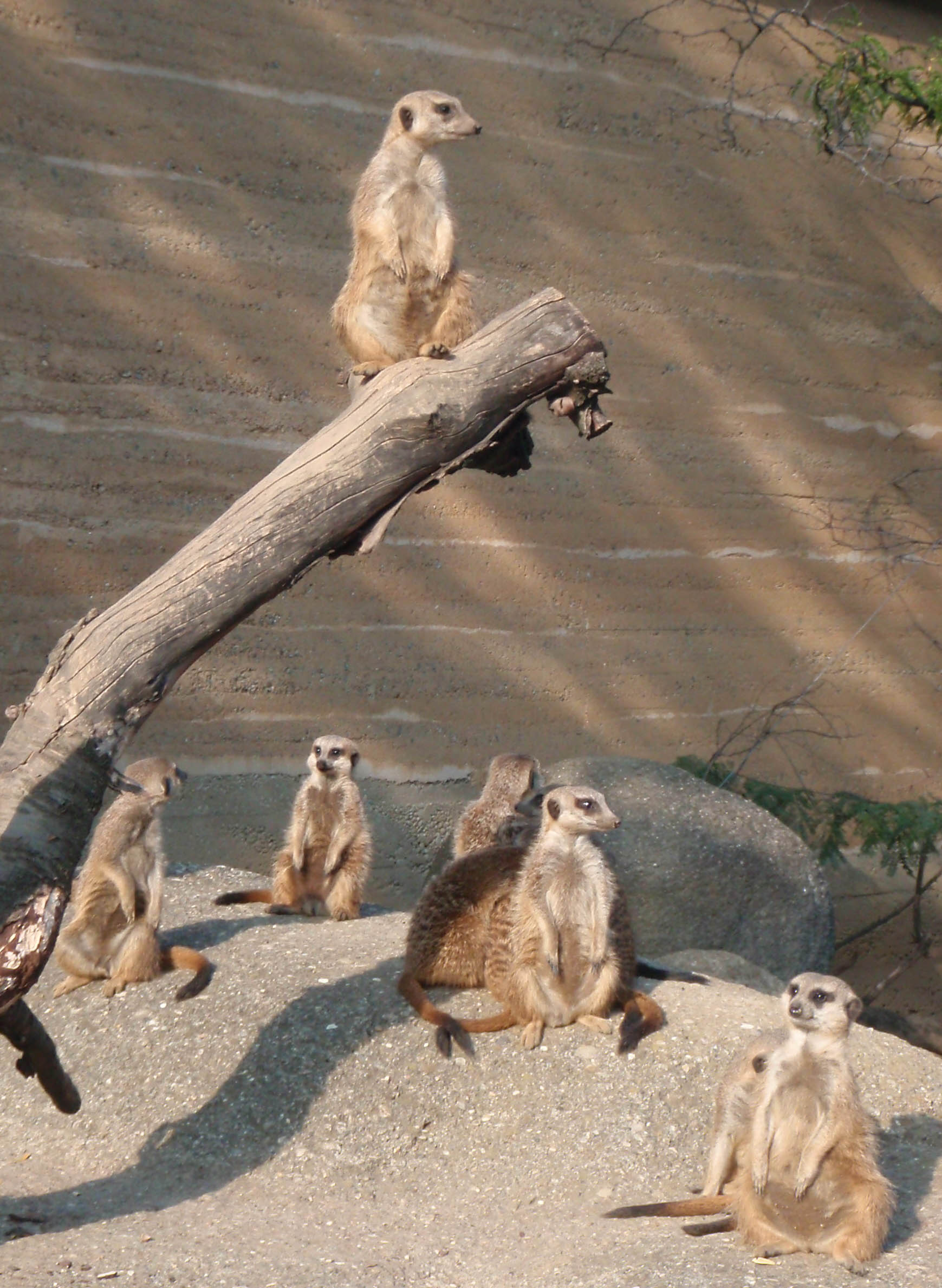
Meerkats by the Etosha House

The opening of the Etosha theme area in 2001 started the implementation of the large theme area concept of modern zoos at Zoo Basel. The exhibit consists of the Etosha house, outdoor exhibits for the cheetahs, African wild dogs, ring-tailed lemurs, Cape porcupines, and the lions, as well as the Gamgoas house. They build a theme area around the African circle of life.

The Etosha exhibit was named after the Etosha National Park: the largest national park in Namibia and in the southwest of Africa. It is about half the size of Switzerland.

=== Gamgoas ===
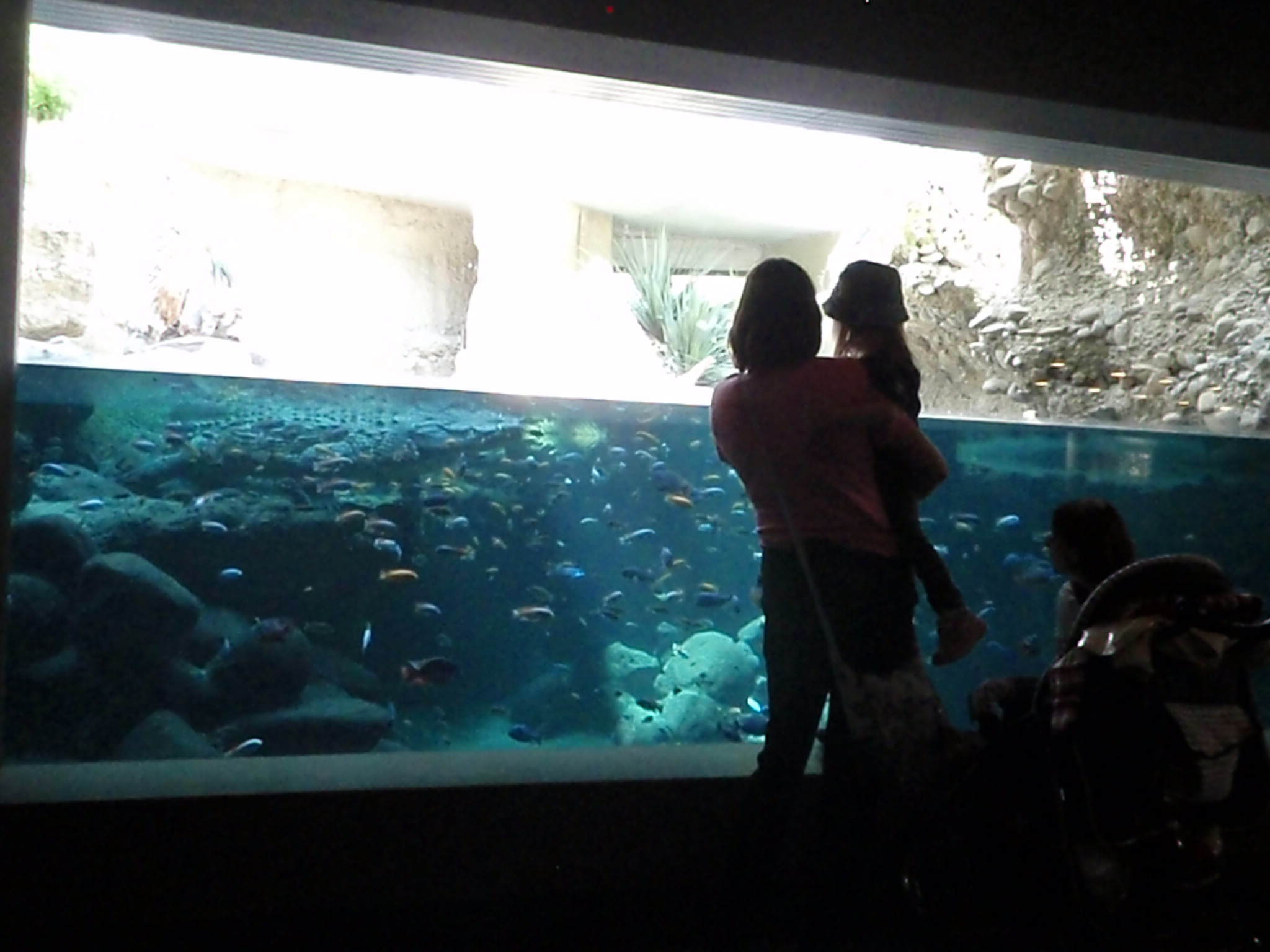
Nile crocodile enclosure

Gamgoas is part of the Etosha theme area, but it refers mainly to the lion and crocodile house. Gamgoas's literal meaning in the local language of the Etosha people is "the place where the lions are."

In the Gamgoas house are two colonies of termites, one chameleon, five Nile crocodiles, several dozen East African cichlids (fish), a semi-large information exhibition, and three lion observation windows. A large window at the Nile crocodile enclosure allows visitors to see the crocodiles under water and to be within an inch of them.

On June 20, 2006, several Nile crocodiles hatched for the first time in the zoo's history. Two of these new crocodiles grew up in the zoo and are now among the five Nile crocodiles at Zoo Basel.

=== Monkey house/exhibit ===
The monkey house (built in 1969) is the zoo's largest building and has had several breeding successes, such as the first gorilla baby in Europe (Goma), the first second-generation zoo gorilla in the world (Tamtam), and rare white-faced saki babies.

On June 30, 2011, the Basel Monkey House was re-opened after extensive renovations and expansions with all monkeys back — except the orangutans and the woolly monkeys, which "came back" in 2012. The 30-million Swiss franc project was completed in the fall of 2012 with the opening of the outdoor exhibits, which are now about thirty times larger than before. More information on this project can be viewed at Developments at Zoo Basel.

=== Sauter Garden ===
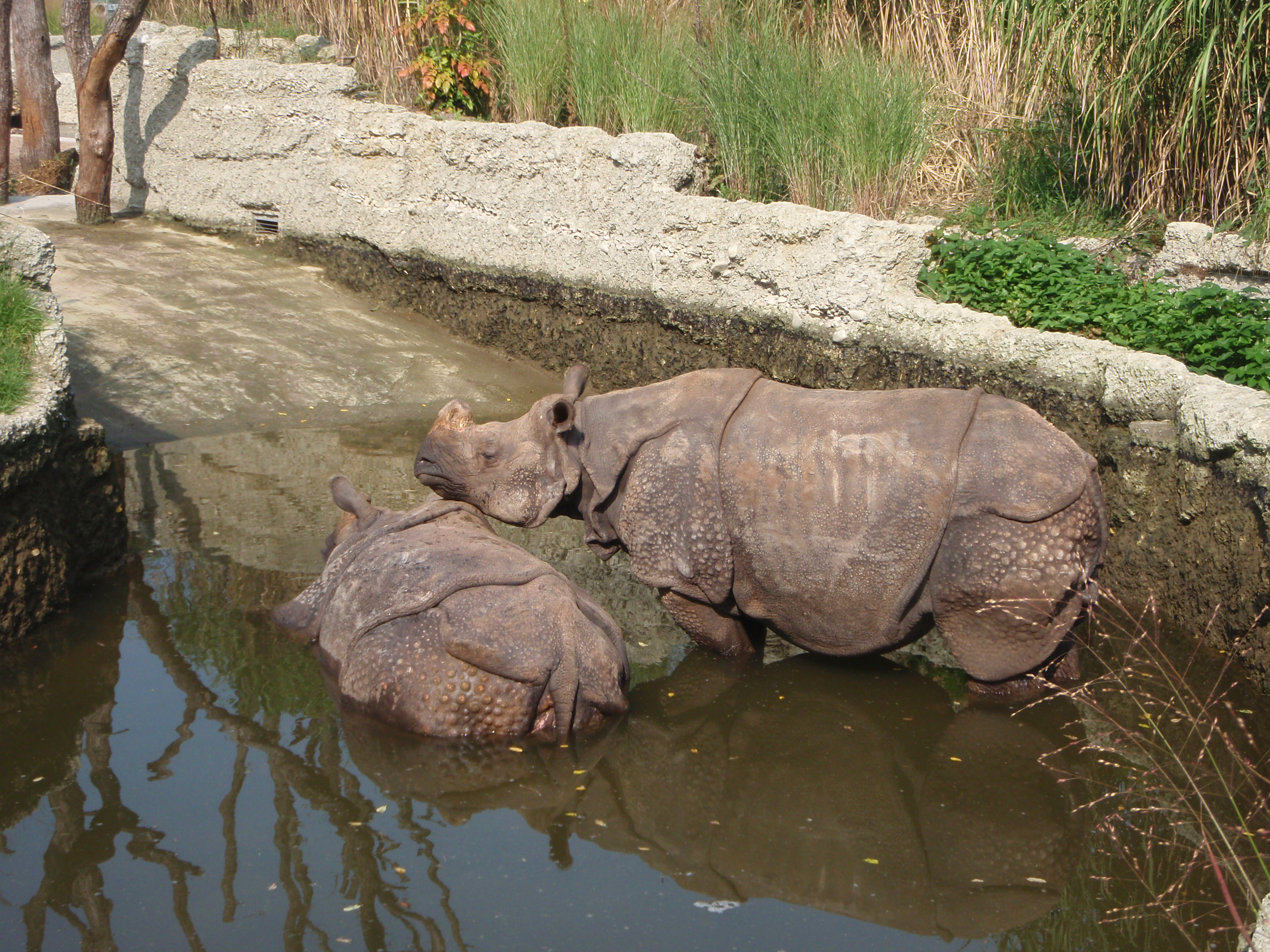
Rhinos in the outdoor exhibit

The Sauter Garden is at the zoo's south end towards Binningen. The land was acquired with money from the local goldsmith Ulrich Sauter and opened to the public in 1939.

The Sauter Garden's focus is on Asia. While African species (like the pygmy hippopotamus) are also in it, its main exhibits are of Asian animals: the Indian rhinoceros, snow leopard exhibits and, as of June 2010, the "Monkey Rock" with about 60 macaques on/in it.

In the rhinoceros exhibit, Indian rhinoceroses, muntjacs, and oriental small-clawed otters share the outdoor area. Since then, the three species lived together with no incidents. The 2.5-ton-rhinoceroses share their food with the 30-kilogram muntjacs or go into one of three ponds where the Asian otters are swimming around the rhinos. The rhino exhibit originally opened in 1959, was extensively renovated, and re-opened in May 2008.

The snow leopard exhibit houses Mayhan and Pator. Both arrived in the winter of 2008/2009 and had three cubs during the spring of 2011. As of June 2011, 30 snow leopards were born in Basel.

== Special opening days ==
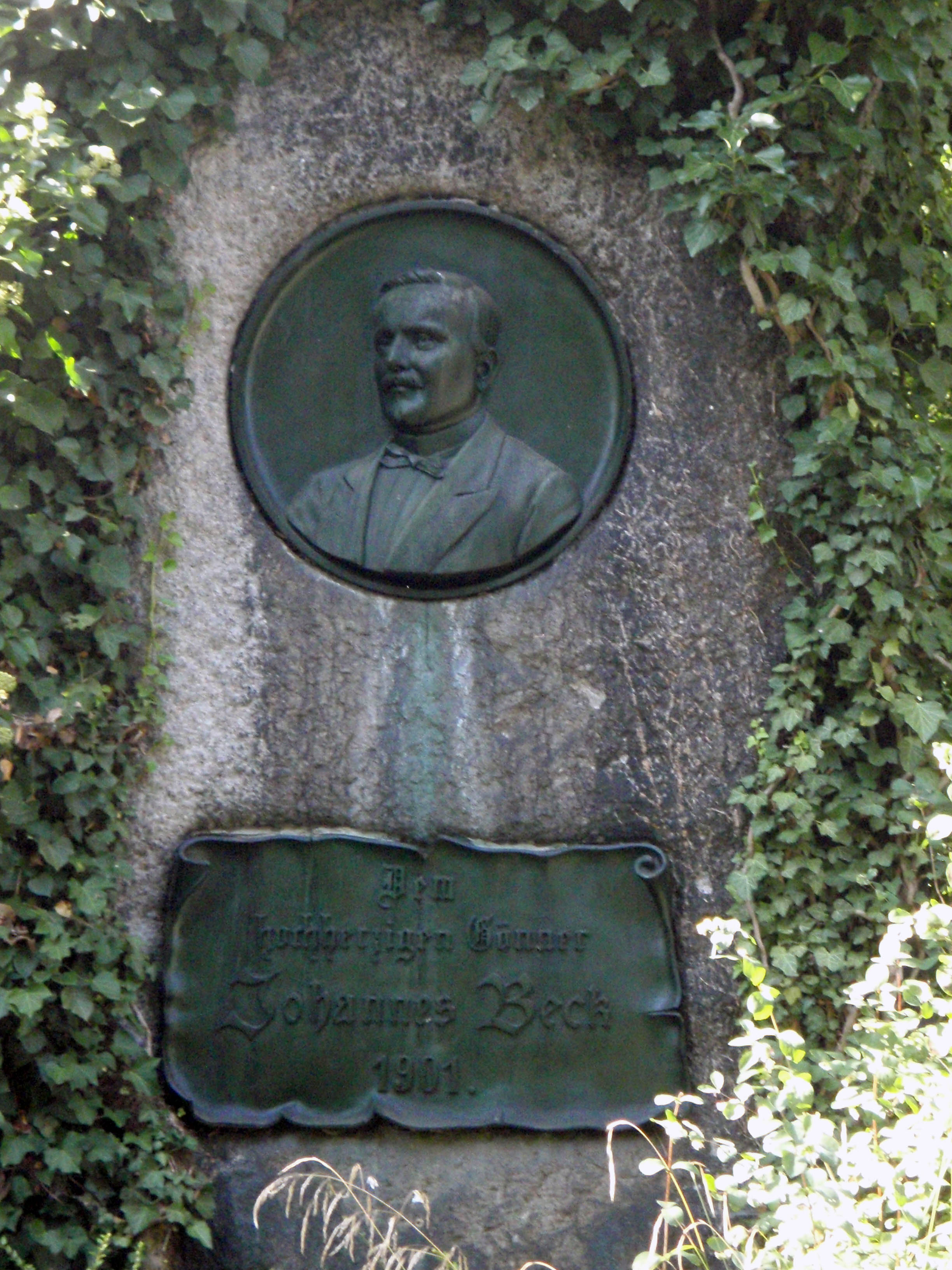
Beck monument

- June 24 — Beck Day: In memory of Johannes Beck, the zoo's first major donor, Zoo Basel is open until 10 pm. After 4 pm, entry to the zoo is free of charge. Each year the 'Beck Day' has special attractions and events, like the Basel gypsy-jazz group BELLEVILLE in 2008, special lunch packages from the Swiss retailer Coop, and the traditional placement of a flower bouquet at Johannes Beck's memorial in the zoo.
- Zolli night: Some days, the zoo stays open until midnight. The entry price is reduced after 5 pm. Among the attractions are several meeting points where every half hour zoo officials give insights of the exhibit and animals that live in it. The dates for this event are different each year and, once set, can be found in the local media and Zoo Basel's official website. In 2010, it was on June 26, with an opening until 11pm.

== Breeding programs ==
Zoo Basel is a member of the World Association of Zoos and Aquariums (WAZA), the European Endangered Species Programme (EEP), and 18 other programs and organizations. In 1935, the forerunner of the WAZA (the International Union of Directors of Zoological Gardens or IUDZG) was founded in Basel.

Among the breeding programs for endangered species that Zoo Basel participates in are the pygmy hippopotamus, Indian rhinoceros, okapi, snow leopard, South African cheetah, squirrel monkeys, and the European otter programs.

=== Cheetahs ===
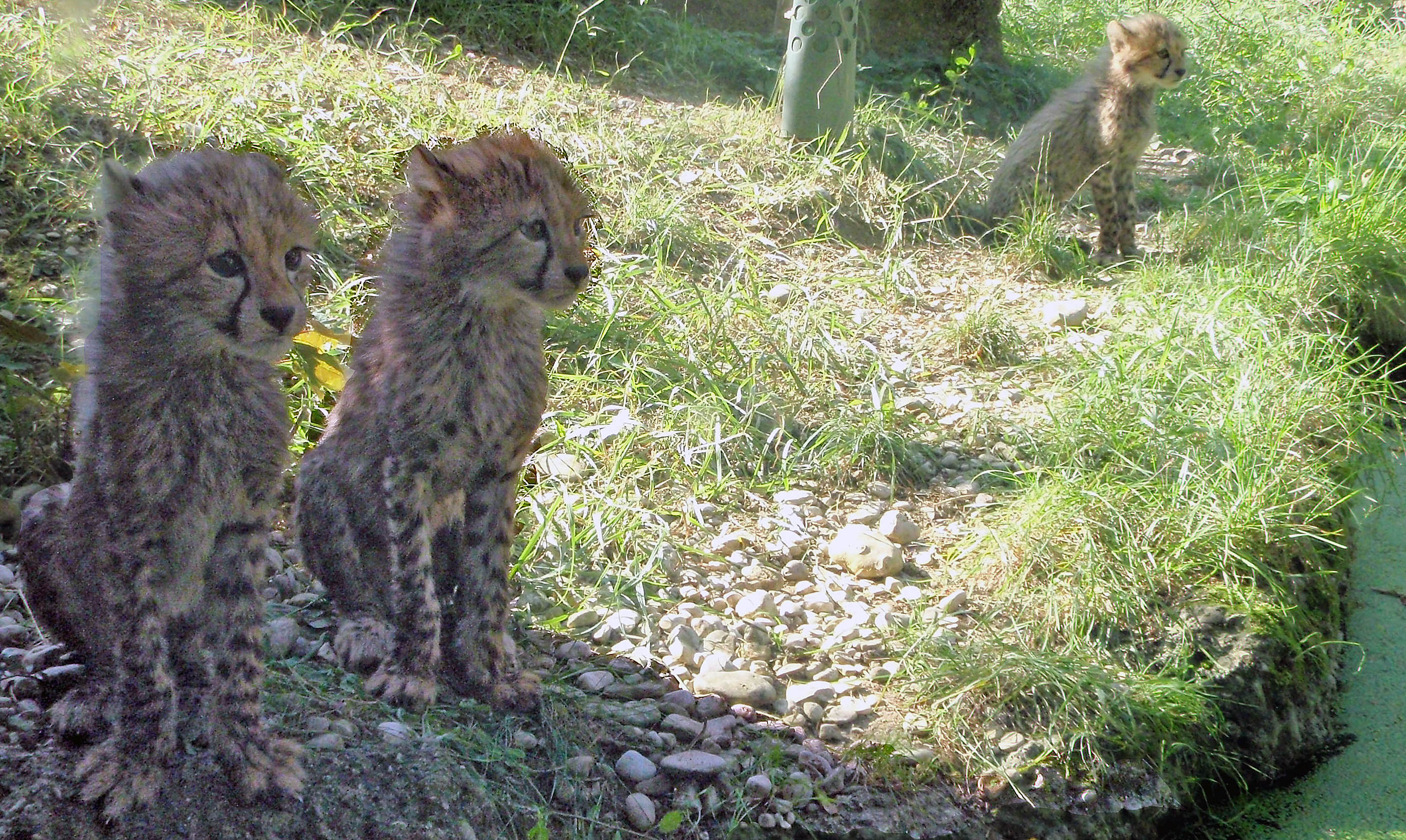
Immature South African cheetahs

Among 82 other European zoos with cheetahs, Zoo Basel's breeding program has been one of the few programs that had repeated breeding success. Basel had five young cheetahs born in 1993, 1995, and 2007, and three in 2009 of which one died that fall.

Cheetah breeding in captivity is difficult, as males and females live separately in the wild and females are picky in choosing a partner. The 30% mortality rate among newborns also lowers breeding success. As such, the new pair of female cheetahs that came to Basel in 2001 did not show interest in the presented males and had no offspring - until "Survivor" came from Vienna in 2006.

=== Indian rhinoceros ===
Zoo Basel has held the international studbook for the Indian rhinoceros since 1972, and since 1990 has coordinated the European Endangered Species Programme (EEP), which ensures that the captive Indian rhinoceros population stays as genetically healthy as possible. One of the main reasons for Basel to have these studbooks is due to its successful breeding program.

Most Indian rhinoceros populations in zoos are related to the one in Basel. On September 14, 1956, Rudra was the first Indian rhino born in the Western Hemisphere. As of 2010, 32 Indian rhinos had been born in Basel, out of about 80 rhino births in zoos worldwide.

=== Okapi ===
Since the first okapi birth at Zoo Basel in 1957, twenty-two okapis have been born in Basel. On December 2, 2009, the okapi bull Stomp (b. 2003) came from Zoo Berlin and on August 24, 2011, the female Hazima (b. 2007) arrived from the British Marwell Wildlife.

In 2008, Basel's Ahadi fathered the first okapi birth in the Czech Republic and Slovakia at Zoo Dvur Kralove. A video of this birth is posted on YouTube.

=== Pygmy hippopotamus ===
Zoo Basel started its breeding program for pygmy hippopotamuses in 1928, which has resulted in 53 hippo births. These animals and their offspring are living all over the globe. The zoo manages the international studbook for this species.

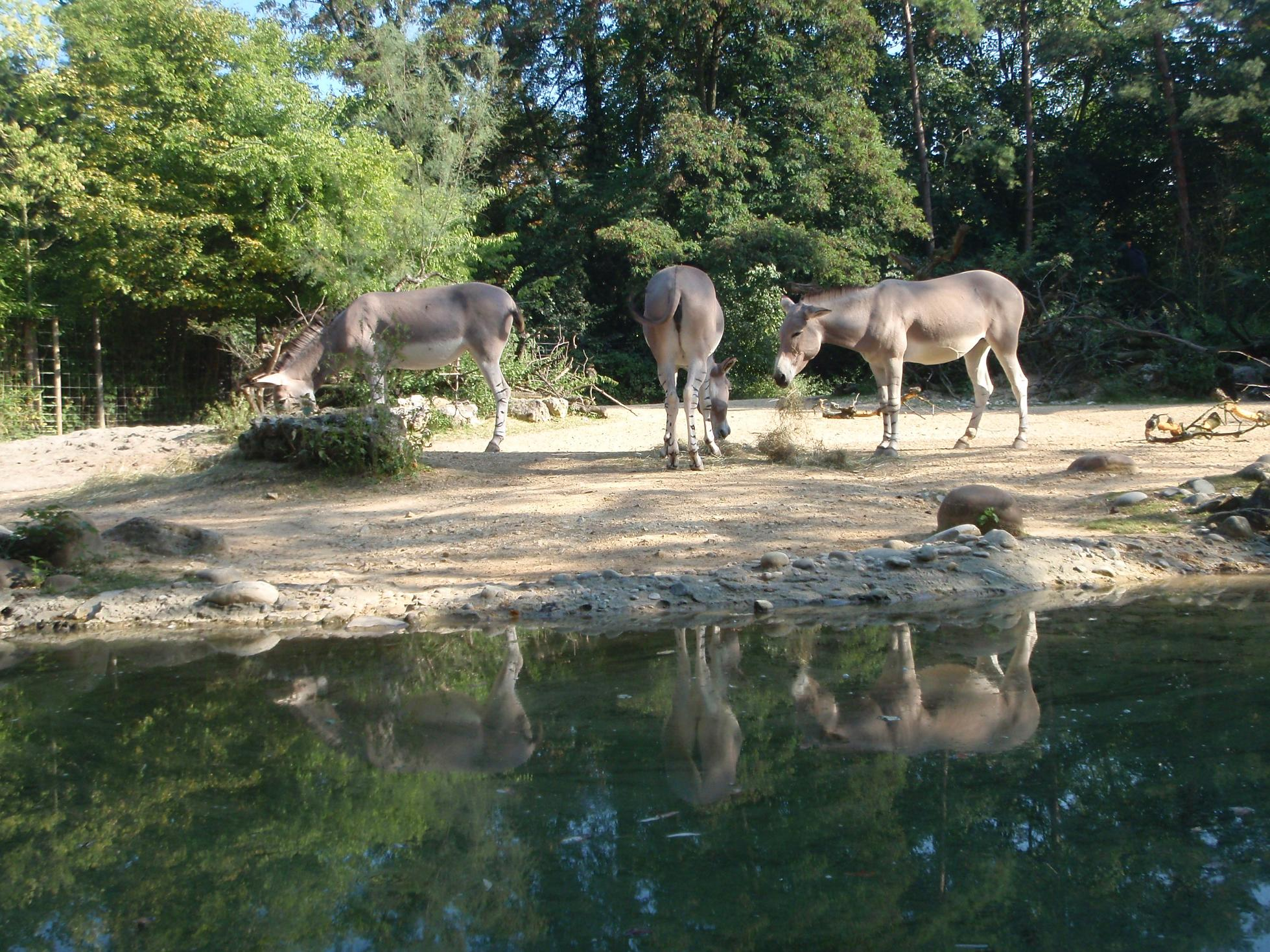
Somali wild ass

Since the construction of the rhino exhibit, the pygmy hippos can only be viewed in their outdoor exhibits. During the winter they are inside and cannot be seen by the public.

=== Somali wild ass ===
This wild donkey (Equus africanus somaliensis) is a subspecies of the African wild ass. Zoo Basel coordinates the European Endangered Species Programme (EEP) of the Somali wild ass, which is on the Red List of critically endangered species as there are likely less than 3000 animals in the wild.

There are about 220 individuals in zoos around the globe of which 38 were born in Basel.

== History ==
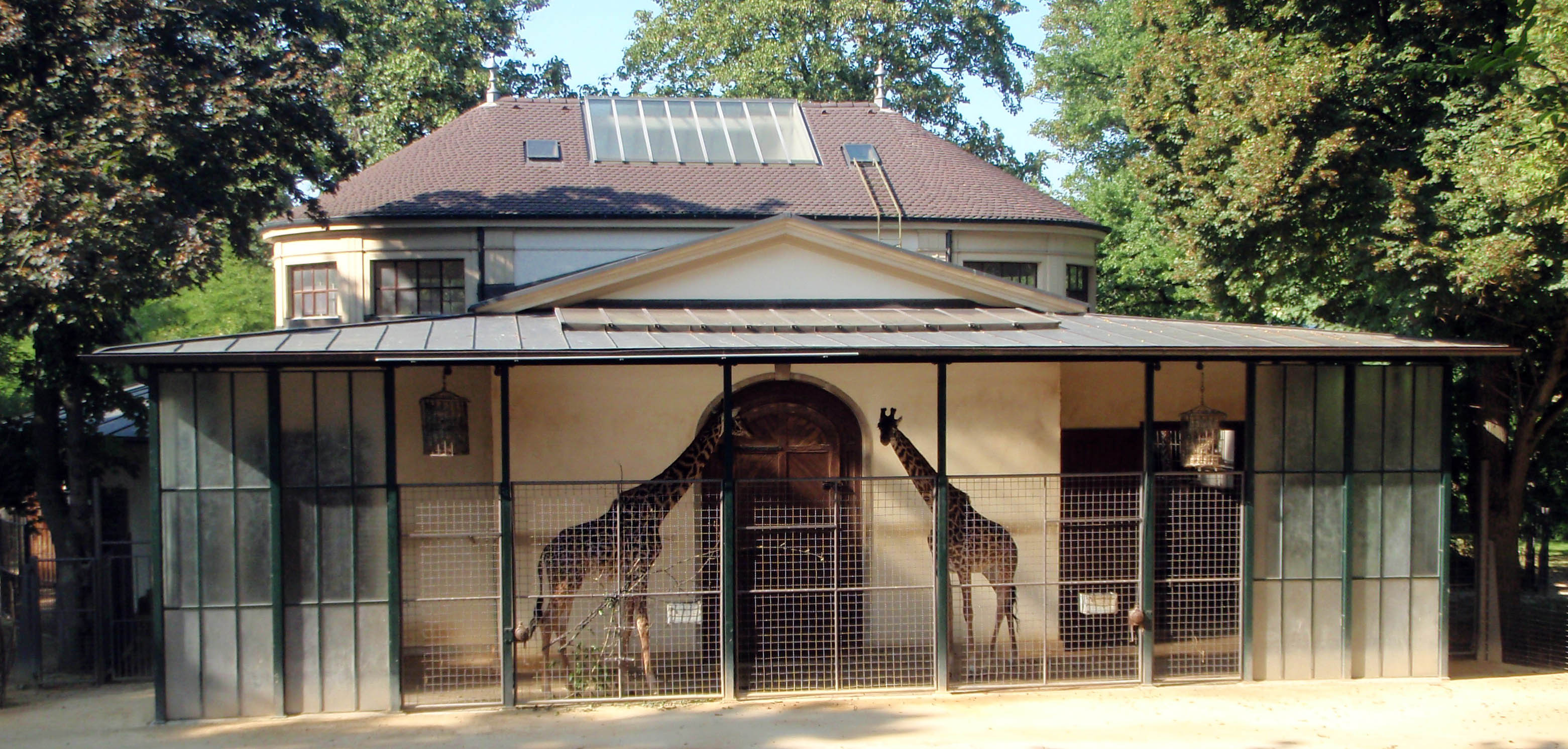
1910: the Antelope House

In 1870, the Ornithologiegesellschaft together with the city of Basel started a project of establishing a zoo where visitors could see Swiss and European animals. Zoo Basel emerged from that project, and opened its doors on July 3, 1874.

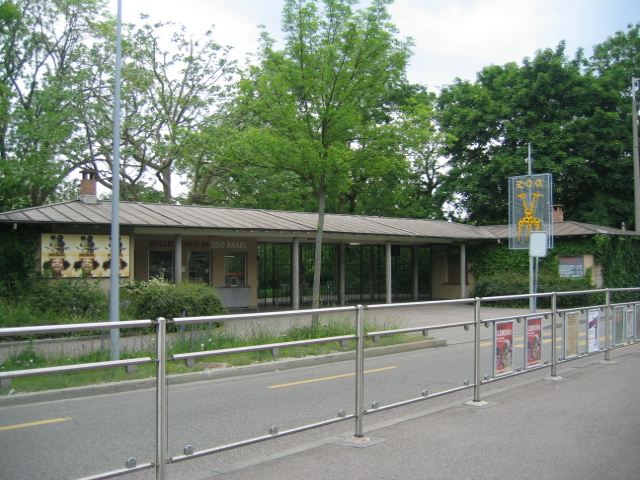
1939: second entrance by Binningen

=== Early years up to 1910 ===
On opening day, many visitors flocked to the zoo and saw mainly Swiss animals, such as bears, lynx, otters, and mountain goats. In its opening year the zoo had 62,000 visitors, even though the city of Basel had only 50,000 inhabitants. In addition, Zoo Basel's nickname, Zolli, was established in its first year and used ever since.

In 1884, the Zolli nearly doubled its area from 4,3 ha by adding the Sautergarten in the south towards Binningen and built a festival meadow in its center. On this meadow people from Nubier, Marocco and Singhalesen built traditional villages and performed war and other ceremonial dances. These displays were very popular at the time, and lasted until 1932.

In 1890, the first lions arrived in Basel, and on March 19, 1891, the first lion cub was born. The carnivore house received several new cages featuring other big cats in 1896. All of these cats were moved into a newly built carnivore house in 1904.

1901 was the year in which the zoo received its first major donation from Johannes Beck that served as a foundation for years to come.

=== Challenges and expansion: 1911 - 1948 ===
The first and second world wars caused Zoo Basel several challenges. During World War One, food prices climbed enormously and visitor numbers dropped. Because of this, the 'Friends of Zoo Basel' was established in 1919, with a goal to make the zoo popular and to support it with animal and money gifts.

Foot-and-mouth disease broke out in 1937. The animal population was decimated like never before seen in Zoo Basel's history and the zoo had to temporarily close its doors.

=== Breeding successes in new exhibits: 1949–2000 ===
Major milestones
Year	Description
July 3, 1874	Opening Day 62,000 visitors in the first year
1884	Expansion towards Binningen
1901	Large Donation Mr. J. Beck donated CHF 750'000
1904	Carnivore House The first carnivore house opened
1910	Antelope House opened — the zoo's oldest building
1914	Death of Miss Kumbuk With great sorrow Basel's population parted from their elephant
1927	Sea lion Exhibit with a rock designed by Urs Eggenschwyler
1935	New restaurant opened with a great financial effort
1937	Worst day in history Many animals died because of an outbreak of foot-and-mouth disease
1939	a new entrance opened at the zoo's south end
1949	the first okapi arrived in Basel
1956	The first Indian rhinoceros birth in a zoo
1969	The current Monkey house opened
1972	The Vivarium (aquarium) opened
1992/93	Africa exhibit opened a new Basel exhibit era
2008/10	the Indian rhino house and outdoor exhibit re-opened — renovated and expanded
2011	the renovated Monkey House and -Rock opened
2012	the large outdoor monkey exhibit opened

For Zoo Basel's 75-year anniversary in 1949, Zoo Basel and the city of Basel developed jubilee plans that resulted in much construction during the 1950s. A new lion house was built in 1956 (that stood until the Gamgoas project), followed by a new elephant house and yet another land expansion to the east, the Nachtigallenwäldli, in 1959.

In 1961, the main entrance was moved toward the Birsig creek.

In 1966, the first African elephant, Ota, was born in Basel. Three years later the monkey house opened.

In 1972, the aquarium, or vivarium, opened where several world-famous breeding successes occurred, such as the successful breeding of sea anemones.

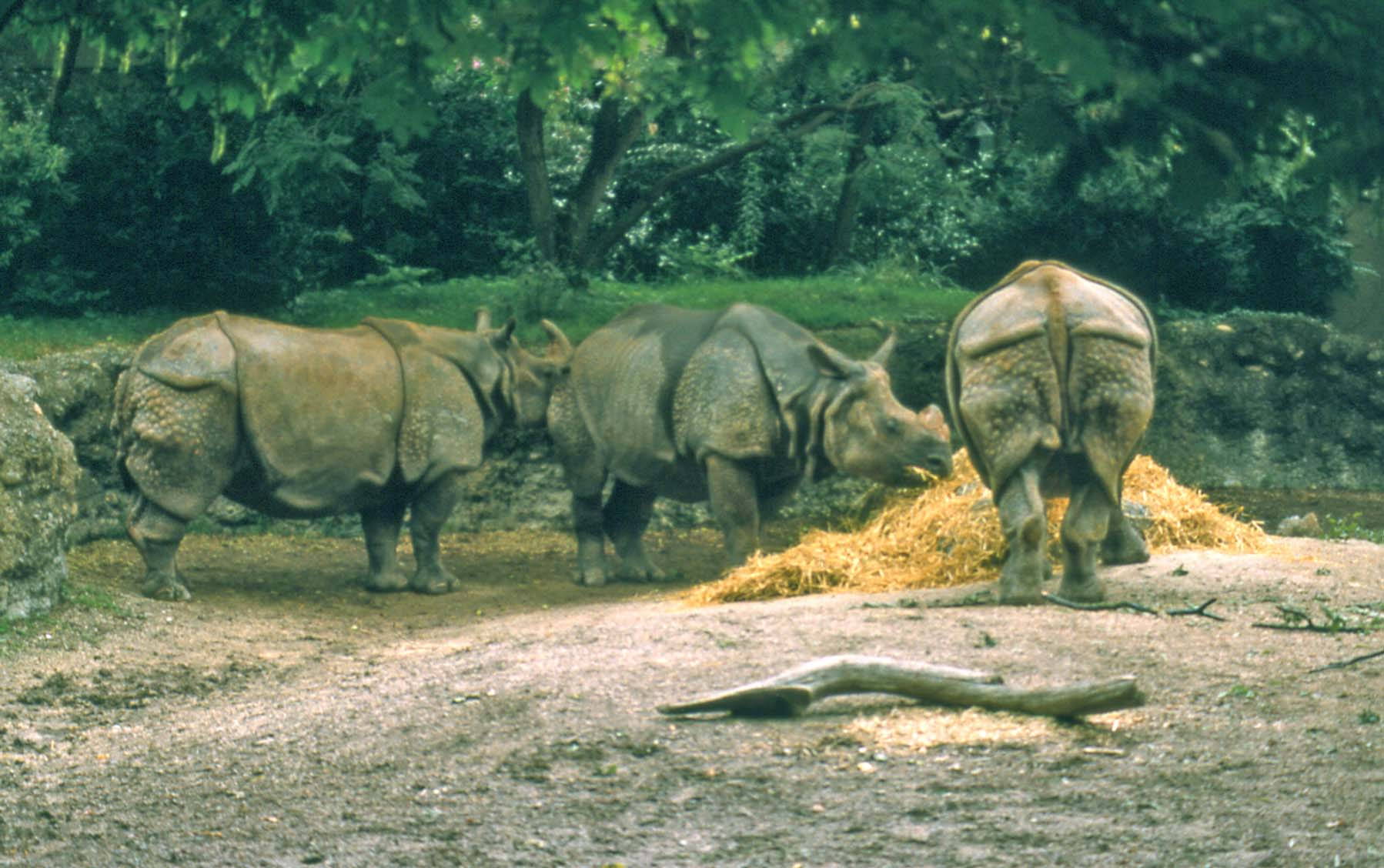
1986: second rhino outdoor exhibit

In 1992, another male African elephant Pambo was born. That year also marked a new Zoo Basel exhibit era with the opening of the Africa exhibit. For the first time, several species were living together. Experiences gained with the Africa exhibit served as example for future projects.

In 1999, the snow leopard exhibit moved into the Sauter Garden, which is being transformed into Asia-themed area.

=== Recent years: since 2001 ===
During the past years, Zoo Basel focused on renovating and expanding existing exhibits, mainly to combine them into larger theme areas. This happened in 2001 with the Etosha House and exhibit as the first part of a larger African themed area. The second phase was opened in 2003 with the Gamgoas house.

In the years 2008 and 2010 the rhino exhibit underwent a major renovation and expansion. First the outdoor exhibit was remodeled to include 3 water ponds, an open flowing stream, and the addition of two new species living in the same outdoor exhibit. Then, in 2010, the renovated and expanded rhino house opened. The hippos no longer had an indoor pond, the four rhino boxes were converted into two large stalls with a soft, jungle-like, wooden floors and a bath was added.

In summer 2011, a new monkey rock in the Sautergarten opened, followed by a renovated and greatly expanded monkey house that fall. A year later, in September 2012, the ape outdoor exhibits opened — about 100 times larger than before construction.

== Future ==
Zoo Basel is constantly upgrading its infrastructure, but can hardly grow in area, as it is surrounded by the city of Basel.

=== 2014: Renovated and expanded restaurant ===
According to Zoo Basel, construction started in the fall of 2013 and was partially completed by Easter 2014. Of interest will be a large window on its side towards the elephant exhibit, additional restrooms, and an additional "take-away" food shop. This project is scheduled to cost 16 million Swiss francs, of which 8 millions are secured through an anonymous donor.

=== 2016: New elephant house ===
The current elephant house (constructed in 1953) is due to be renovated and expanded. Planned are boxes for the females, a larger outdoor male area, and overall expansion of the area towards the old kangaroo exhibit.

Because of the large donation for the monkey expansion project, Zoo Basel is able to finance this project.

On June 21, 2012, Zoo Basel's board of directors approved this project. Under the theme "mobility," it is planned on the current elephant exhibit, as well as on the old kangaroo exhibit, the playground adjacent to the elephant house, and the lemurs exhibit.

On April 10, 2013, Zoo Basel published following update:

"Construction work on the new elephant enclosure will begin in August [2013]. It will cover around 5000 square metres, making it more than double the size of its predecessor. The enclosure consists of various partial outdoor enclosures and a new elephant house... Some of the funding for this 28-million-franc project is already in place, with the remaining ten million being sought through donations. The enclosure is scheduled to open in the autumn of 2016. As well as elephants, the zoo plans to house guinea fowl, white storks, harvester ants and Norway rats."

=== 2019: Ozeanium (additional aquarium) ===
Ozeanium on Heuwaage

On March 17, 2009, Zoo Basel announced its intent to build Switzerland's first large-scale ocean aquarium. Mainly through private donors, a 70-million-Swiss-franc building is planned to be built on the Heuwaage square and will extend into the downtown nightlife strip of Steinen.

On December 4, 2012, Zoo Basel published that construction is expected to begin in 2016. Thomas Jermann, the project manager, said that it "if everything goes according to plan, visitors can enter our Ozeanium from 2019 on." But in May 2019 the project was rejected in a cantonal referendum.

== List of animals ==
Animals

Mammals

- African elephant
- African pygmy goat
- African striped grass mouse
- African wild dog
- American bison
- Black and rufous sengi
- Black-and-white ruffed lemur
- Black-capped squirrel monkey
- California sea lion
- Cape ground squirrel
- Cheetah
- Chimpanzee
- Common woolly monkey
- Coppery titi monkey
- Cotton-top tamarin
- Crab-eating macaque
- Crested porcupine
- Dwarf mongoose
- European mouflon
- Geoffroy's spider monkey
- Golden lion tamarin
- Guinea pig
- Hippopotamus
- Indian rhinoceros
- Kordofan giraffe
- Lesser kudu
- Lion
- Llama
- Miniature donkey
- Miniature pig
- North American porcupine
- Nutria
- Okapi
- Oriental small-clawed otter
- Pygmy hippopotamus
- Pygmy zebu
- Reeves's muntjac
- Reindeer
- Rock hyrax
- Sable antelope
- Sheep
- Shetland pony
- Short-eared elephant shrew
- Slender-tailed meerkat
- Snow leopard
- Somali wild ass
- Sumatran orangutan
- Visayan warty pig
- Welsh pony
- Western grey kangaroo
- Western lowland gorilla
- White-faced saki
- Wild boar
- Zambian mole-rat

Birds

- Amazilia hummingbird
- Asian fairy-bluebird
- Australian brush-turkey
- Bali myna
- Bar-headed goose
- Bay-headed tanager
- Black swan
- Black-cheeked lovebird
- Black-footed penguin
- Blue-black grassquit
- Blue-crowned hanging parrot
- Blue-crowned laughingthrush
- Black-naped fruit dove
- Blue-necked tanager
- Chestnut-backed thrush
- Coscoroba swan
- Crested partridge
- Dalmatian pelican
- Emei Shan liocichla
- Emerald starling
- European roller
- European white stork
- Fischer's turaco
- Gentoo penguin
- Great cormorant
- Great white pelican
- Greater flamingo
- Grey heron
- Hawaiian goose
- Hermit ibis
- Intermediate hill myna
- Java sparrow
- Kea
- Kilimanjaro white-eye
- King penguin
- Little owl
- Marbled duck
- Mindanao bleeding-heart
- Montserrat oriole
- Nicobar pigeon
- Northern carmine bee-eater
- Orange-bellied leafbird
- Orpington chicken
- Ostrich
- Palawan peacock-pheasant
- Purple-naped lory
- Red siskin
- Red-billed hornbill
- Red-billed leiothrix
- Red-legged honeycreeper
- Red-tailed laughingthrush
- Silkie
- Sociable weaver
- Socorro dove
- Southern ground hornbill
- Sumatran laughingthrush
- Turquoise tanager
- Vietnamese pheasant
- Violaceous euphonia
- Visayan hornbill
- White-rumped shama
- Yellow cardinal

Reptiles and amphibians

- Alligator snapping turtle
- Armadillo girdled lizard
- Burmese python
- Cane toad
- Chinese crocodile lizard
- Freshwater crocodile
- Gila monster
- Green tree python
- Hellbender
- Horned viper
- Karoo dwarf tortoise
- Marginated tortoise
- Mourning gecko
- Nile crocodile
- Northern caiman lizard
- Olive tree skink
- Pancake tortoise
- Pig-nosed turtle
- Radiated tortoise
- Red-eared slider
- Rhinoceros ratsnake
- Spiny-tailed monitor
- Tokay gecko
- Western Hermann's tortoise

Fish

- Apron
- Australian lungfish
- Banggai cardinalfish
- Bichir
- Big-belly seahorse
- Black-tailed antenna ray
- Bluestreak cleaner wrasse
- Clown anemonefish
- Clouded archerfish
- Cuckoo catfish
- Discus
- Emperor angelfish
- European eel
- European sea sturgeon
- Featherfin cichlid
- French angelfish
- Freshwater angelfish
- Garibaldi damselfish
- Green spotted puffer
- Horn shark
- Leopard moray
- Leopard shark
- Lesser-spotted dogfish
- Longnose gar
- Longspine snipefish
- Marbled hatchetfish
- Mbu pufferfish
- Mediterranean moray
- Neon tetra
- Northern pike
- Pearse's mudskipper
- Powder blue tang
- Purple tang
- Red lionfish
- Red-bellied piranha
- Shiner perch
- Sling-jaw wrasse
- Sohal surgeonfish
- Splash tetra
- Spotted garden eel
- Stonefish
- Twig catfish
- Yellow boxfish
- Yellow tang
- Zebra moray

Invertebrates

- Black widow spider
- Common octopus
- Giant prickly stick insect
- Moon jellyfish
- Migratory locust
- Rose chafer
- Termite
- Western honey bee
- White-spotted jellyfish

== Notable residents – past and current ==
=== Miss Kumbuk (? – 1917) ===
Miss Kumbuk, was Zoo Basel's first elephant. She was an Asian elephant and arrived in 1891. For her the first Basel elephant house was built.

=== Rudra (1956–1987) ===
Rdura was the first Indian rhinoceros born in a zoo in 1956. He was the son of rhino bull Gadadhar and the female Joymothi that came from Kaziranga National Park. Two hours after birth he weighed 60.5 kg and was 105 cm long and quickly gained 1.5 kilograms per day. In 1959, Rudra was transferred to the Milwaukee County Zoo, where he only became a father once before his death.

=== Goma (1959 – ) ===
Goma was the first gorilla born in Europe (western lowland gorilla, the second worldwide in a zoo) and was raised by zoo officials. On May 2, 1972 she and Jambo had the world's first second generation zoo offspring: Tamtam (who died in summer 2009). She is the oldest member of the gorilla group in Basel (May 2010) and celebrated her 50th birthday on September 23, 2009, with a large public birthday party.

=== Jambo ( 1961–1992) ===
Jambo was a western lowland gorilla born in Basel. He became a celebrity sensation at the Jersey Zoo where on August 31, 1986 he cared for a 5-year-old boy who fell into the gorilla habitat. A video of the fall is on YouTube and was watched nearly 700,000 times before it was deleted in September 2009 and relisted. Two new movies of this event have been watched over 280,000 times combined (May 2010). After Jambo died in 1992, a bronze statue in his memory erected at the zoo and Gerald Durrell produced a video documentary called Jambo — the Gentle Giant. Richard Johnstone-Scott wrote the book Jambo — A Gorilla's Story.

Jambo was named by Zoo Basel's director Ernst H. Lang and means in Swahili “Hello” or “How are you?” Due to Basels Jambo, apes across the globe are called "Jambo", similar to Lassie (the collie dog) or Nemo (the clownfish).

=== Pambo (1992 – ) ===
Young male African elephant, who was a visitors' favorite. He was transferred first to Vienna Zoo, where he fathered an elephant girl called Mongu, and was on October 26, 2009, transferred to Cabarceno Natural Park in Spain, where he lived together with another bull and ten females, until he was transferred to Bioparc Valencia on 28 November 2012, where he died almost two months later, on 23 January 2013.

=== Ruaha (1951 – 29.07.2010 ) ===
Ruaha was the oldest known African elephant at her time and the matriarch of Basel's elephant herd. She came to Basel on November 1, 1952, and was, while living, nine years older than North Americas oldest African elephant Hy-Dari at Hogle Zoo, Salt Lake City, Utah.

Ruaha was the matriarch of Basel's elephant group and was one of the five original African elephants that came to Basel into the new elephant house. Similar to elderly humans, signs of her 59 years alive were visible and she did not lay down to sleep for her last 20 years. Nevertheless, her death came unexpectedly as she did not have any health problems the days before her death. Ruaha was found dead in the outdoor exhibit early morning on Thursday, July 29, 2010, by her zoo keeper.

=== Farasi (2008 – ) ===
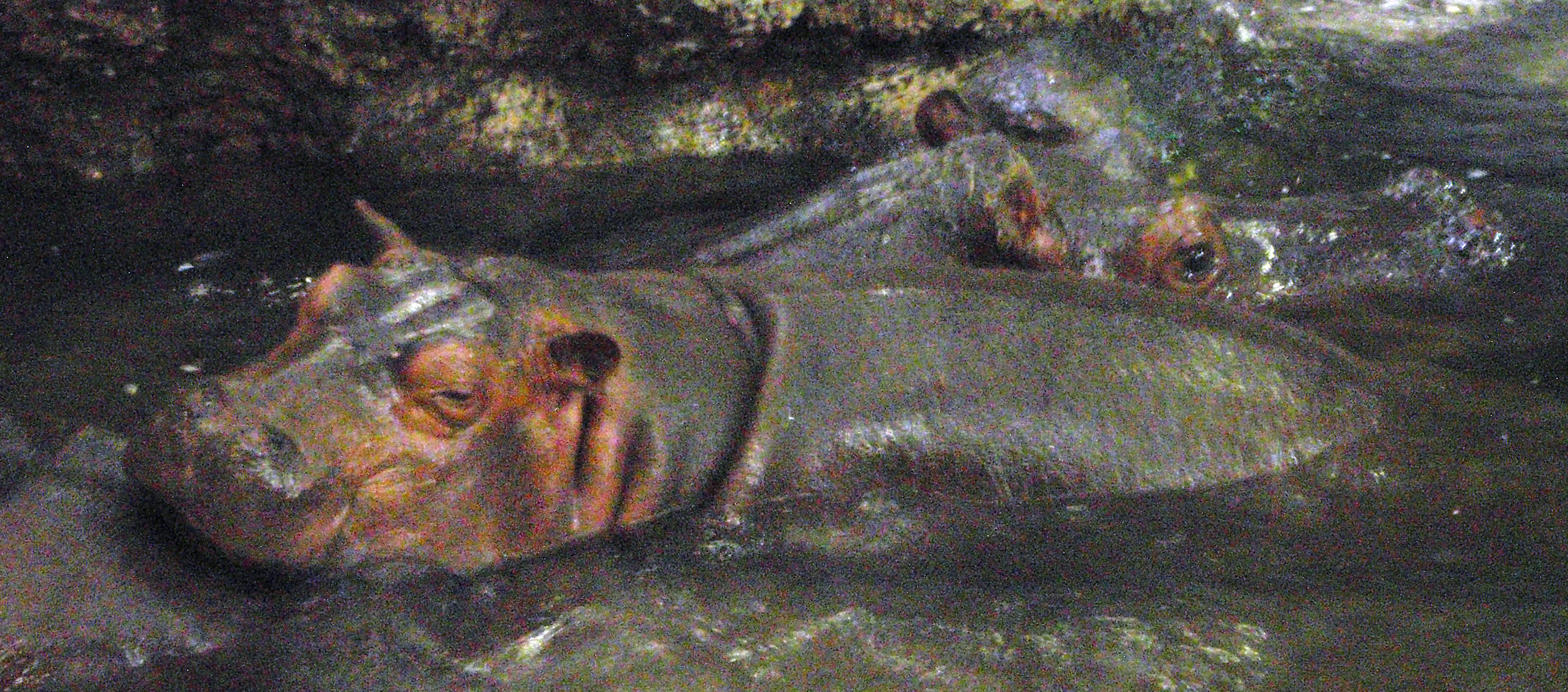
Farasi: September 2009

Farasi is a male hippopotamus that became world-famous when news broke that zoo officials apparently intended to kill him and feed him to the lions (or tigers, as per MSNBC).

Zoo Basel quickly denied these plans; however, the news of it spread around the globe. His story was written in newspapers like the Wall Street Journal and made it to TV news such as at MSNBC, that claimed the zoo intends to feed Farasi to the tigers — even though there are no tigers in Basel. He has a Facebook page in French.

On November 17, 2010, Farasi left Zoo Basel to Tshukudu Private Game Reserve in South Africa.

While Farasi has been "saved" from being Basel-lion food, ironically, he was attacked by a lion in South Africa. As Farasi was at first too small to defend himself against predators, he was kept in a large enclosure on the reserve. However, in 2011, Farasi broke out of this protected area and was eventually attacked by a lion during a night on land. The wounds were not severe, but a veterinarian was called; Farasi had to be tranquilized and was brought back to safety in an enclosure with an electric fence. According to Sylvia Sussens, of the reserve, Farasi should have been large enough to defend himself by 2012 and was scheduled to be released into the wild.

== In the media ==
- Forbes Travel listed Zoo Basel among the fifteen best zoos in the world in 2008. Even though it is listed at the number two spot, the Forbes list is in alphabetical order and therefore Zoo Basel is only one among the 15 best zoos.
- Anthony Sheridan's (from the Zoological Society of London) study of 60 leading zoos, ranked Basel Zoo as seventh best in Europe in 2009.
- Basler Zeitung (Basel's main newspaper) publishes about weekly news of the zoo and has part of its webpage dedicated to Zoo Basel as: Dossier: Der Basler Zolli.
- Zoo Basel sponsors annually a Zolli Apero, which is an open house for the media.
- The Travelblog of Rates to Go ranked Zoo Basel as 9th best zoo in the world.
- Vacation Homes added Zoo Basel in 2012 as 6th best zoo in the world.

== Sources ==
- Zoo Basel (2025). "Jahresbericht 2024" (PDF) (in German). Zoo Basel. Archived (PDF) from the original on 2025-09-06.
