= Mbulu (disambiguation) =

Mbulu is a town in Tanzania and the capital of the Mbulu District. Mbulu may also refer to

- Mbulu Highlands in north-central Tanzania
- Mbulu white-eye, a bird found in Kenya and Tanzania
- Christian Mbulu (1996–2020), British football player
- Letta Mbulu (born 1942), South African jazz singer
- Richard Mbulu (born 1994), Malawian football player
- The Congo peafowl, called mbulu by the Bakongo
