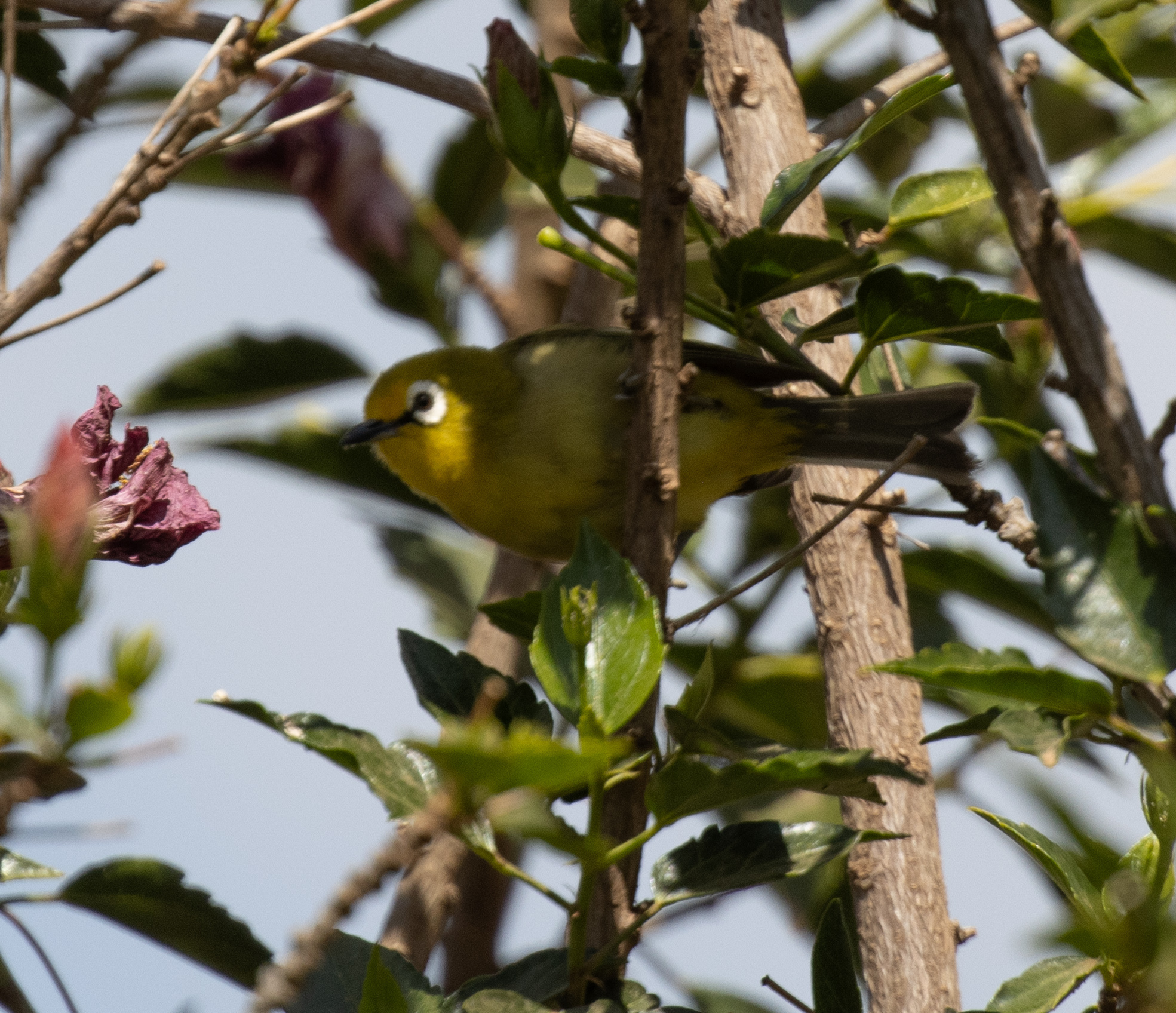

Conservation status
- Least Concern (IUCN 3.1)

Scientific classification
- Kingdom: Animalia
- Phylum: Chordata
- Class: Aves
- Order: Passeriformes
- Family: Zosteropidae
- Genus: Zosterops
- Species: Z. kaffensis

Binomial name
- Zosterops kaffensis Neumann, 1902

= Kafa white-eye =

Species of songbird

The Kafa white-eye (Zosterops kaffensis) is a small passerine bird in the white-eye family, Zosteropidae. It is found in west and southwest Ethiopia as well as on Mount Kulal in north Kenya. It was formerly considered to be a subspecies of Ethiopian white-eye.

== Taxonomy ==
The Kafa white-eye was formally described in 1902 by the German ornithologist Oscar Neumann from a specimen collected near Anderaccha in the Kaffa region of southwest Ethiopia. He placed the new species in the genus Zosterops and coined the current binomial name Zosterops kaffensis. The genus name combines the Ancient Greek zōstēros meaning "belt" or "girdle" with ōpos meaning "eye". The specific epithet kaffensis is from Kaffa Province, a former kingdom in south-western Ethiopia. The Kafa white-eye was formerly considered to be a subspecies of the Ethiopian white-eye. It was elevated to species status based on the divergence of the mitochondrial DNA sequence and differences in plumage.

Two subspecies are recognised:

- Z. k. kaffensis Neumann, 1902 – west, southwest Ethiopia
- Z. k. kulalensis Williams, JG, 1948 – Mount Kulal (north Kenya)
