= Developments at Zoo Basel =

Zoo Basel
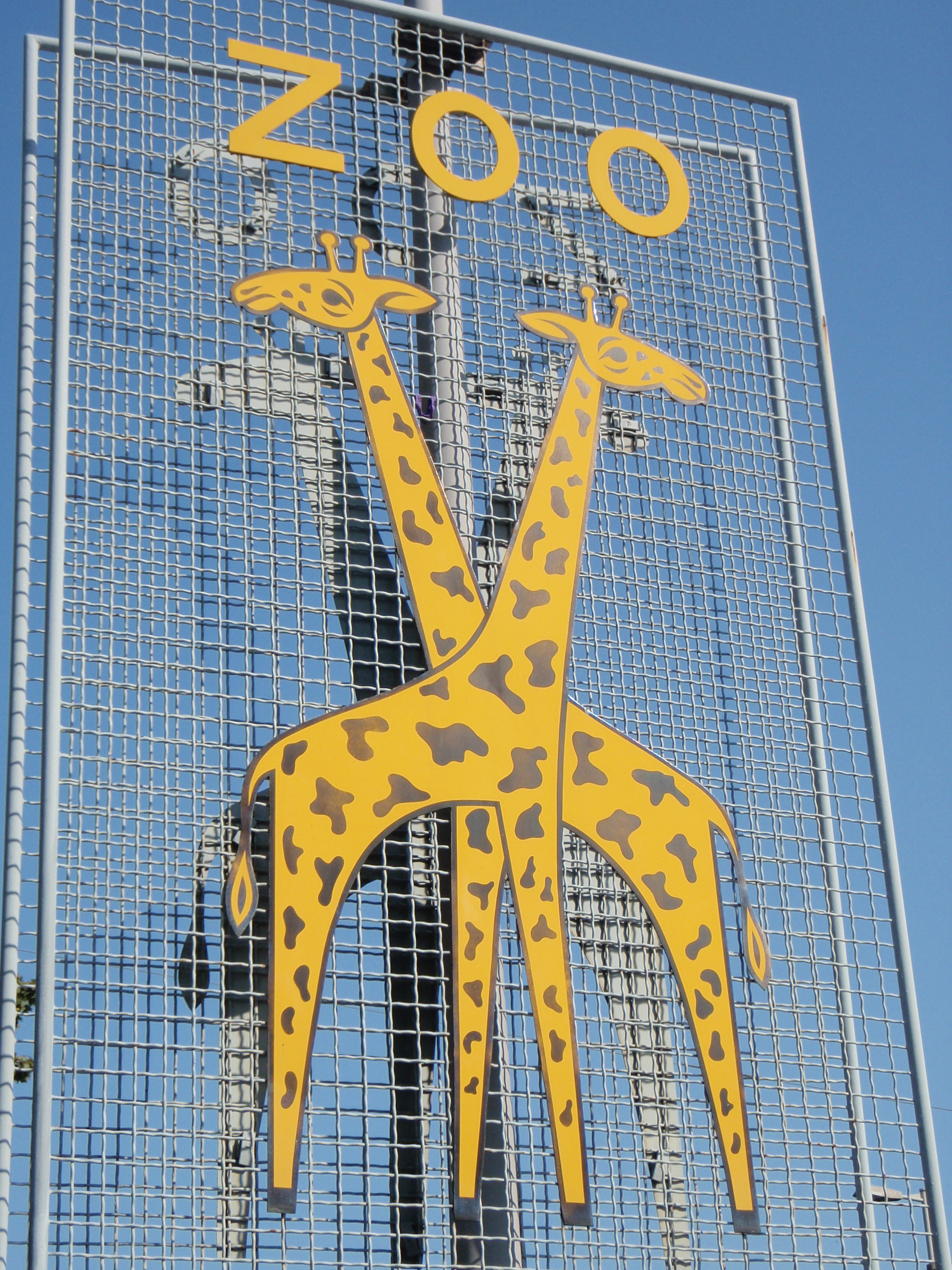
- Zoo Basel logo
- Interactive map of Zoo Basel
- 47°32′50″N 7°34′44″E
- Date opened: 3 July 1874
- Location: Basel, Switzerland
- Land area: 32.12 acres (13.00 ha)
- No. of animals: 6,894 (2008 / about 5,000 in the aquarium)
- No. of species: 645 (2008)
- Website: http://www.zoobasel.ch

The Zoo Basel is constantly upgrading its infrastructure, but can hardly grow in area, as it is surrounded by the city of Basel, Switzerland, and, in the south, by Binningen. While most projects are upgrading older infrastructure and constructing multiple-animal exhibits, the zoo has plans to expand in area as well.

== 2011 / 2012: Monkey house and exhibit ==
Starting in April/May 2010 the monkey house and the surrounding area will undergo extensive construction. This includes the demolition of the small monkey house (home of the ring-tailed lemurs), the macaques rock, the children's play ground, the old bear exhibits, and several paths.

On 30 June 2011 the enlarged monkey house opened. While visitors have the same amount of space available, the apes' space more than doubled from 340 square metres (3,700 sq ft) to 700 square metres (7,500 sq ft). The old outer walls were removed and the living quarters were extended in depth and height. Eventually, there will be additional compartments with no public access, a service tunnel, worker quarters, and restrooms added.

In summer 2012 five large outdoor "cages", the remodeled monkey house roof, a new ape playground, and several new paths will open. The outdoor cages will have a double net layer; one for safety reasons and the other, outer layer, for plants to grow on. The cages' heights will be 16 metres (52 ft) for the orangutans and 11 metres (36 ft) for the other apes. The apes' outdoor area will grow from today's 70 square metres (750 sq ft) to over 2,000 square metres (22,000 sq ft). The children's playground is planned to go along with the jungle theme - similar to the one in the Etosha exhibit. The paths on the monkey roof, around the new cages, by the main entrance, and the former bear exhibits will be adjusted and/or newly constructed.

=== Temporary housing ===
According to the Basler Zeitung online on 10 March 2010, the orangutans left Basel. The gorillas and 150 other smaller monkey found a temporary home on an unidentified Novartis site in Basel. On 14 April 2010, Basler Zeitung reported that all apes left the zoo. All monkeys returned before the monkey house opening on 30 June 2011 - except the orangutans and the woolly monkeys.

=== Time table ===
All projects are completed, with the exception of the opening of the five large outdoor cages. This, final phase, is scheduled to open on 28 September 2012.

== 2014: Restaurant renovation and expansion ==
The renovation is scheduled to start in 2013 and just before Easter 2014 the restaurant, at least partially, will be re-opened. During renovation it is planned to continue restaurant services in tents.

== 2016: New elephant house ==
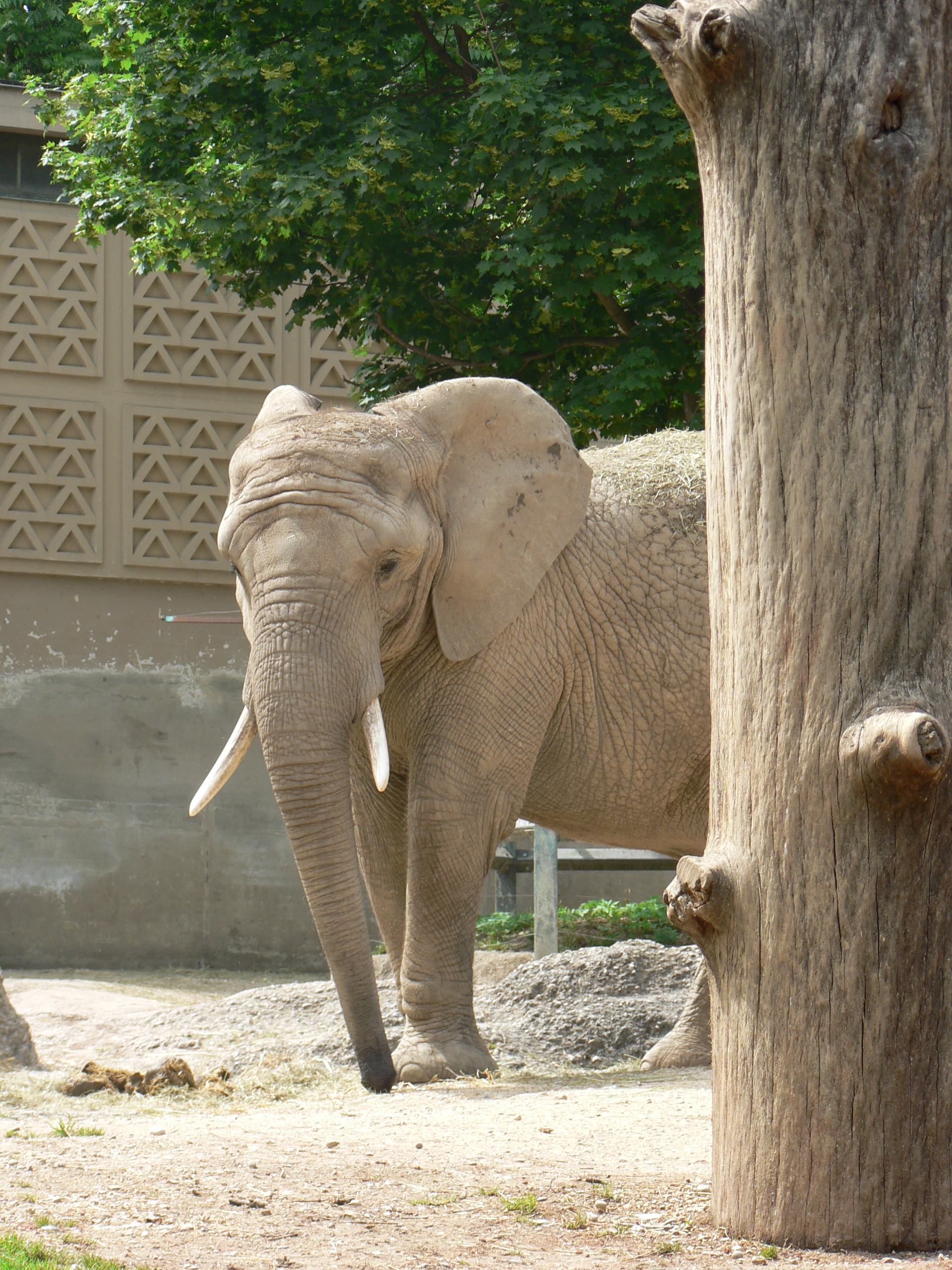
current elephant exhibit

The current elephant house (constructed in 1953) is due to be renovated and expanded. Planned are boxes for the females, a larger outdoor male area, and overall expansion of the area towards the old kangaroo exhibit.

Because of an estimated 24-million-Swiss-franc donation for the monkey expansion project, Zoo Basel is able to finance this project. According to Basler Zeitung from 12 May 2010, the elephant house will be expanded before the Ozeanium project.

On 21 June 2012 Zoo Basel's board of directors approved this project. Under the theme "mobility," a new exhibit is planned on the current elephant exhibit. According to Oliver Pagan, zoo director, this exhibit will be larger than the current elephant exhibit and include the old kangaroo exhibit, the playground adjacent to the elephant house, and the lemurs exhibit. The new elephant exhibit will have three parts: one for the male and two for females. Construction is scheduled to start in 2013 and is planned to conclude in 2016.

== 2018: Ozeanium (additional aquarium) ==
On 17 March 2009 Zoo Basel announced its intent to build Switzerland's first large-scale ocean aquarium. Mainly through private donors, a 70-million-Swiss-franc building is planned to be built on the Heuwaage square and will extend into the downtown nightlife strip of Steinen. It is scheduled to open in 2018.

=== Future animals ===
The building will host several thousand animals from all five large oceans in tanks that are up to 8 metres and a diameter of up to 30 metres. Among these animals are planned to be sharks, coral reefs, large octopuses, and penguins.

=== House description ===
The building will have four floors: One underground, on ground level, and two above ground. It will have a themed restaurant and shops that will be opened beyond the regular zoo hours.

=== Aquarium in Middle Europe ===
Zoo Basel's proposal would be the only large scale aquarium in Switzerland in middle Europe. According to Zoo Basel, similar ocean aquariums are over 500 kilometres (310 mi) away. Among them in Arnhem (Netherlands), Genoa (Italy), Lisbon (Portugal), and Barcelona (Spain). All of them are popular visitor destinations with hundreds of thousands of visitors each year. Because of these examples Zoo Basel anticipates that its Ozeanium would be self-sustaining and boost the zoo's annual visitors to over 2 million.

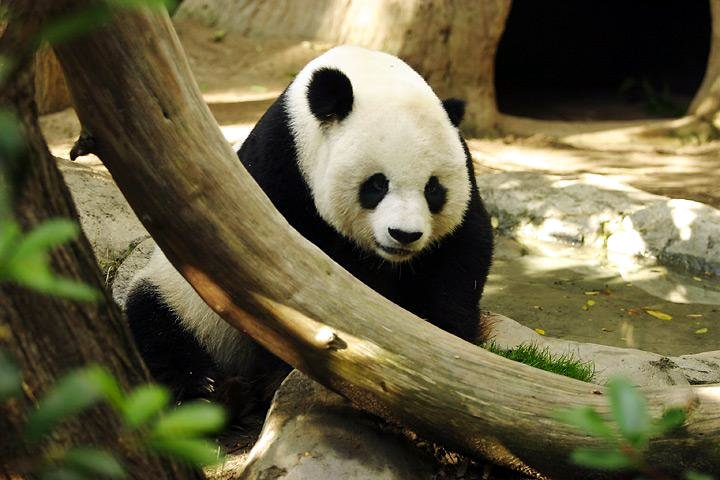
Giant panda at the San Diego Zoo

== Panda exhibit ==
In the long run, Zoo Basel would like to acquire rare giant pandas and have them in the Sautergarten area as part of the Asian theme area. According to the zoo's web page, zoo officials hope that giant pandas would "excite visitors to learn about the Chinese plant and animal life, as well as environment protection".

== Other area expansion possibilities ==
Since 1961, the zoo has not grown in area.

=== Asia theme area ===
There is a possibility to expand east across the Birsig river. This would allow additional space for the giant pandas and other exhibits in the Sauter Garden.

=== Parking space ===
In various Basler Zeitung publications, a possible expansion to the north (Nachtigallen Wäldchen) was mentioned. A possible scenario would have demolished the parking facilities and moved them to another place, possibly a car park underneath the street just east of the current parking area, underneath the Erdbeerestreet.

== Past projects ==
=== Shelved ===
- Polaris: an arctic- and penguin-oriented project in the Markthalle (de), a large concrete cupola building just across from the French railway station. That project has been rejected in favour of a small shopping mall with a 47-apartment high-rise next to it.

=== Constructed ===
- On 30 June 2011 the enlarged monkey house opened. While visitors have the same amount of space available, the apes' space more than double from 340 square metres (3,700 sq ft) to 700 square metres (7,500 sq ft). The old outer walls were torn down and the living quarters were extended in depth and height. Eventually, there will be additional compartments with no public access, a service tunnel, worker quarters, and restrooms added.
