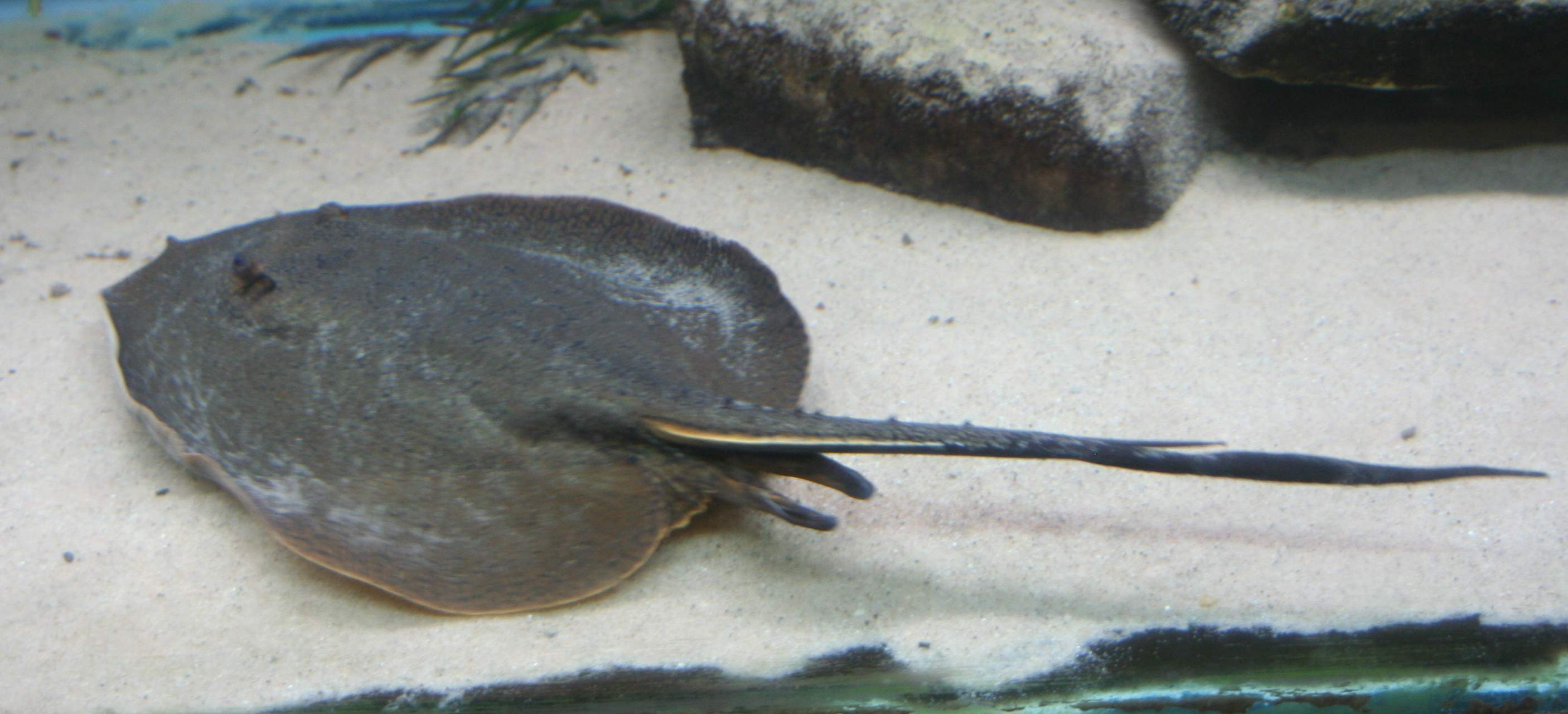
- Plesiotrygon iwamae

Scientific classification
- Kingdom: Animalia
- Phylum: Chordata
- Class: Chondrichthyes
- Subclass: Elasmobranchii
- Order: Myliobatiformes
- Family: Potamotrygonidae
- Subfamily: Potamotrygoninae
- Genus: Plesiotrygon; R. de S. Rosa, Castello & Thorson, 1987

Type species
- Plesiotrygon iwamae R. de S. Rosa, Castello & Thorson 1987

= Plesiotrygon =

Genus of cartilaginous fishes

Plesiotrygon, the antenna rays, is a small genus of freshwater stingrays in the family Potamotrygonidae endemic to the Amazon basin in South America. They are found in large rivers and the lower part of their tributaries. The maximum disc width is up to 58 cm (23 in), but both species are very long-tailed (tail length typically at least twice the disc width).

Plesiotrygon are occasionally kept in aquariums and both species have been bred in captivity, but they are sensitive and the tail is easily damaged.

== Species ==
There are two recognized species:

- Plesiotrygon iwamae R. de S. Rosa, Castello & Thorson, 1987 (long-tailed river stingray, antenna ray)
- Plesiotrygon nana M. R. de Carvalho & Ragno, 2011 (black-tailed antenna ray, dwarf antenna ray)
