= Mount Kulal =

Extinct volcano in northern Kenya

- Location within Kenya

Highest point
- Elevation: 2,285 m (7,497 ft)
- Prominence: 1,542 m (5,059 ft)
- Listing: Ultra; Ribu
- Coordinates: 02°43′45″N 36°55′24″E

Geography
- Location: Kenya

Mount Kulal is an eroded extinct volcano located in northern Kenya, just east of Lake Turkana. The mountain has an elevation of 2,285 metres (7,497 ft). The lakeside town of Loiyangalani is located 50 kilometres (31 mi) west of Mount Kulal.

Mount Kulal has been a biosphere reserve since 1978.

Mount Kulal is the only place where Kulal white-eye (Zosterops kulalensis) has been found.

== See also ==
- List of Ultras of Africa
