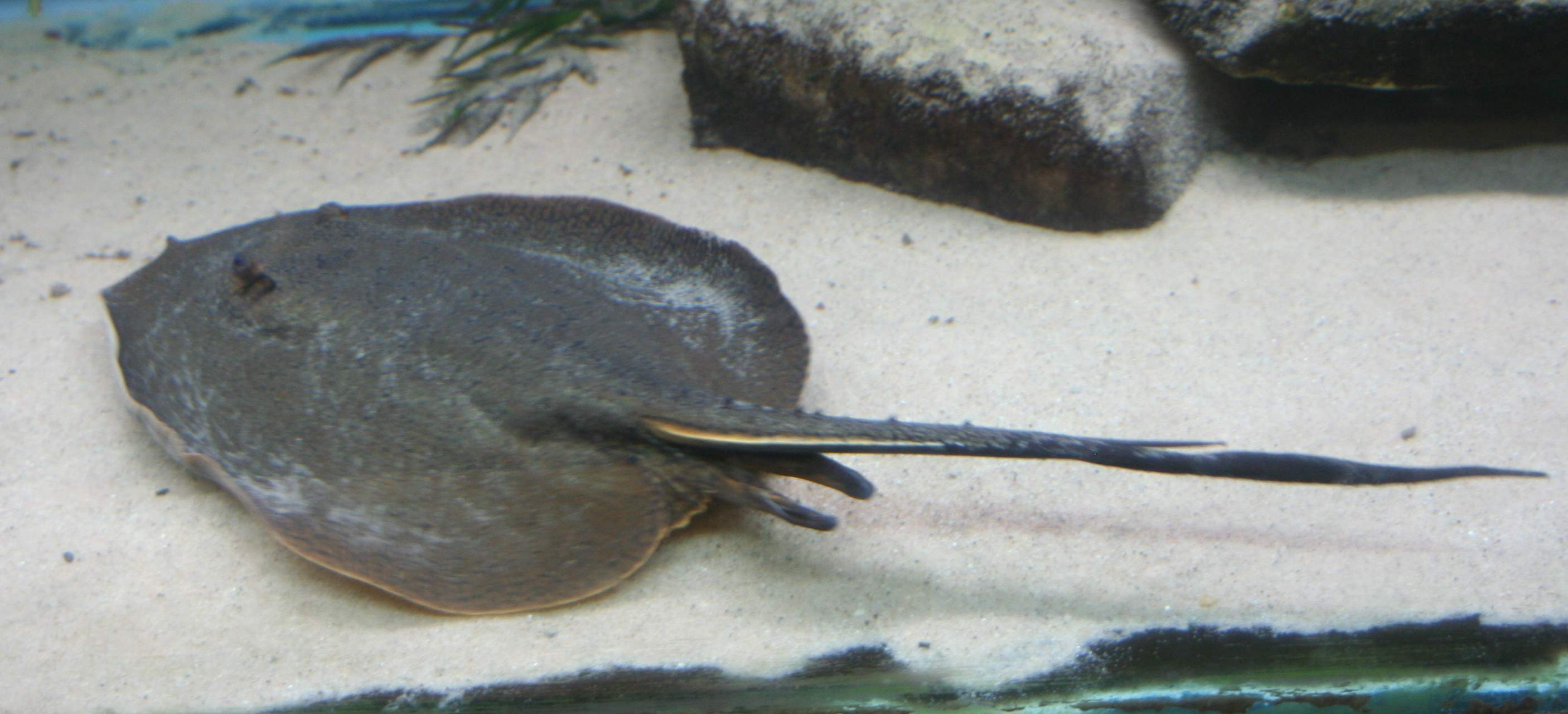

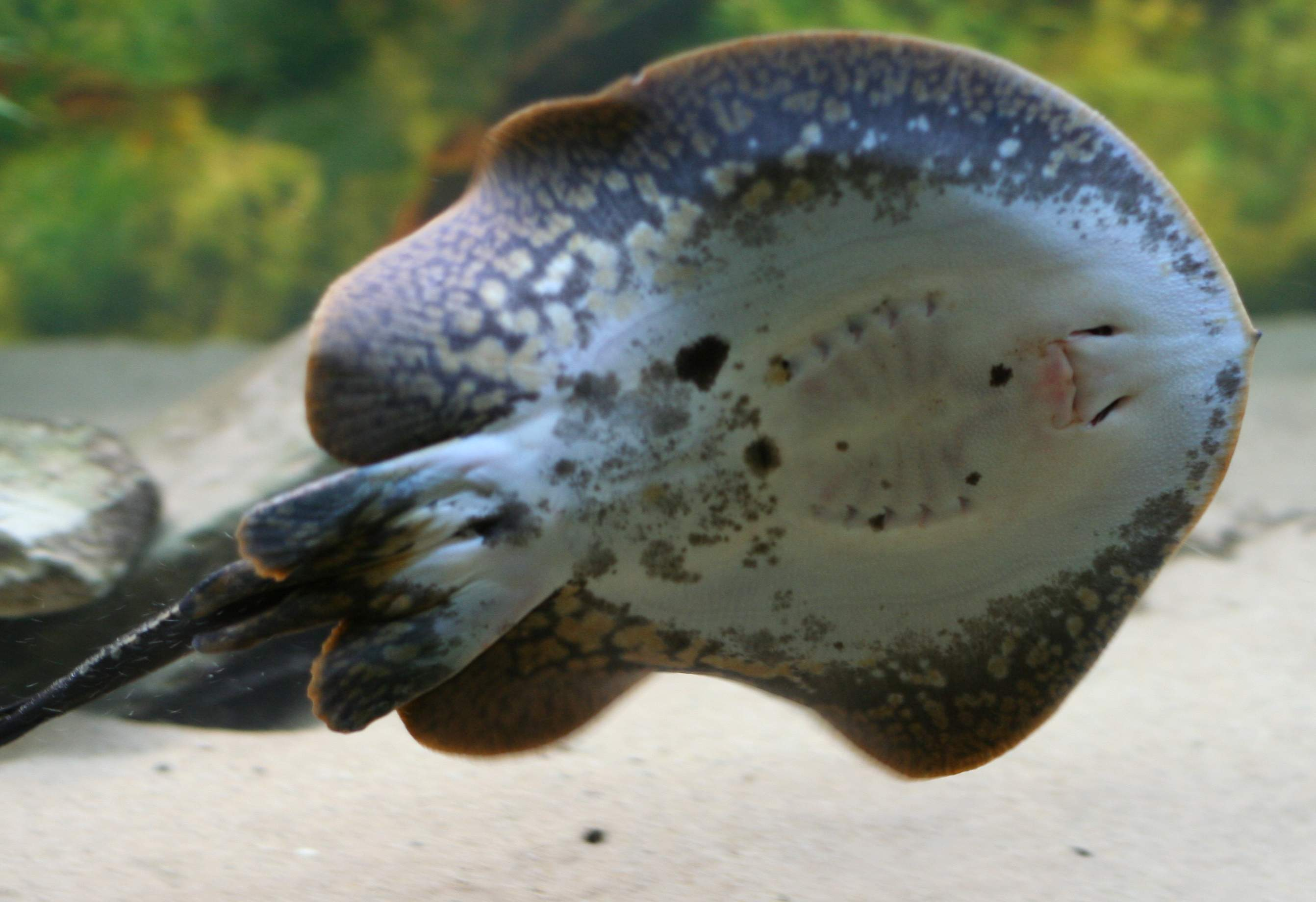

Conservation status
- Vulnerable (IUCN 3.1)

Scientific classification
- Kingdom: Animalia
- Phylum: Chordata
- Class: Chondrichthyes
- Subclass: Elasmobranchii
- Order: Myliobatiformes
- Family: Potamotrygonidae
- Genus: Plesiotrygon
- Species: P. iwamae

Binomial name
- Plesiotrygon iwamae R. de S. Rosa, Castello & Thorson, 1987

= Long-tailed river stingray =

Species of cartilaginous fish

The long-tailed river stingray or antenna ray (Plesiotrygon iwamae) is a species of freshwater stingray in the family Potamotrygonidae. It is found in the Amazon basin in South America, ranging from Ecuador to Belém. It lives in the main channel of the Amazon River and lower parts of its major tributaries.

Characteristic features are a very long filiform tail, reduced eyes, and a low number of pectoral-fin radials. It resembles the black-tailed antenna ray (P. nana), but is larger at up to 58 cm (1.90 ft) in disc width.

Their prey includes worms, crustaceans, mollusks, and small bottom fish (such as small catfish). They can detect electrical and chemical signals from prey in mud and sand.

The species was described in 1987 by Hugo P. Castello from Museu de Zoologia, University of São Paulo. Previously misidentified, or unidentified, specimens were then found in other museums.

The fish is named in honor of the zoologist Satoko Iwama (d. 1987) of the Instituto de Botânica in São Paulo (Brazil).

Although the species is sensitive and the tail is easily damaged, this fish occasionally appears in the aquarium trade and it has been bred in captivity.
