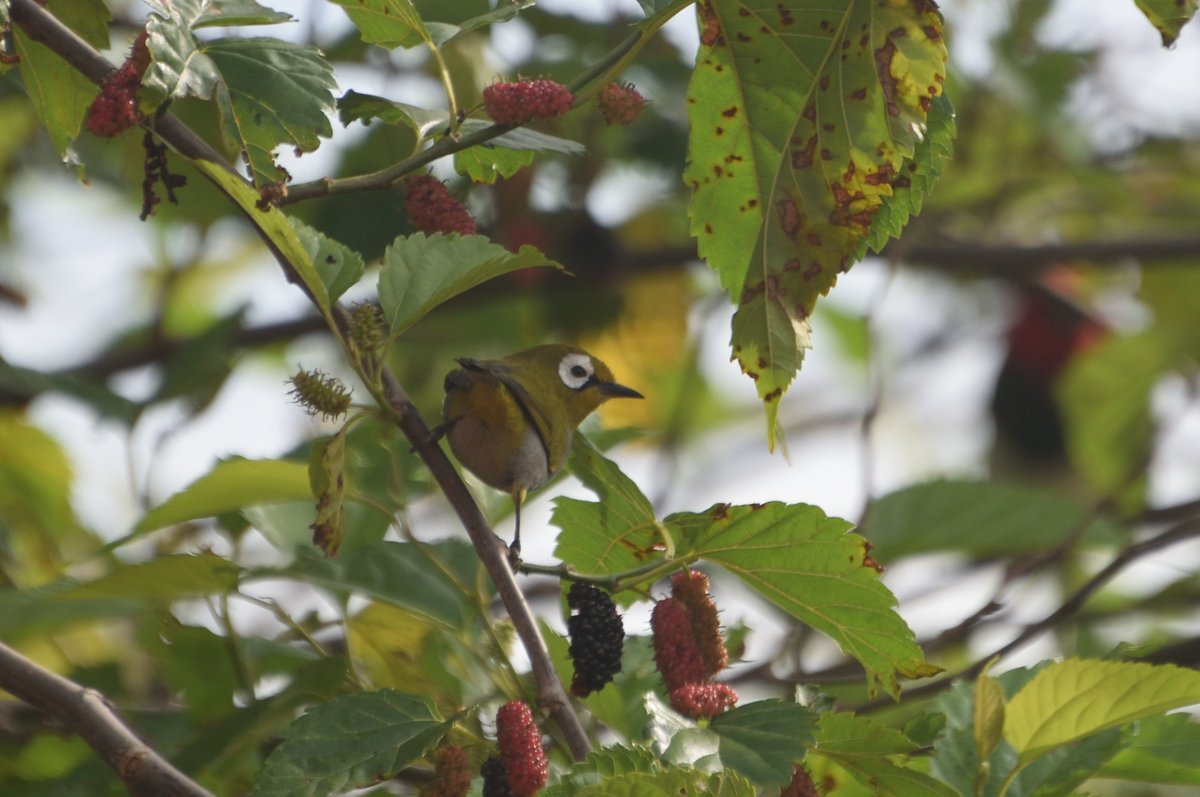

Conservation status
- Vulnerable (IUCN 3.1)

Scientific classification
- Kingdom: Animalia
- Phylum: Chordata
- Class: Aves
- Order: Passeriformes
- Family: Zosteropidae
- Genus: Zosterops
- Species: Z. silvanus

Binomial name
- Zosterops silvanus Peters, JL & Loveridge, 1935
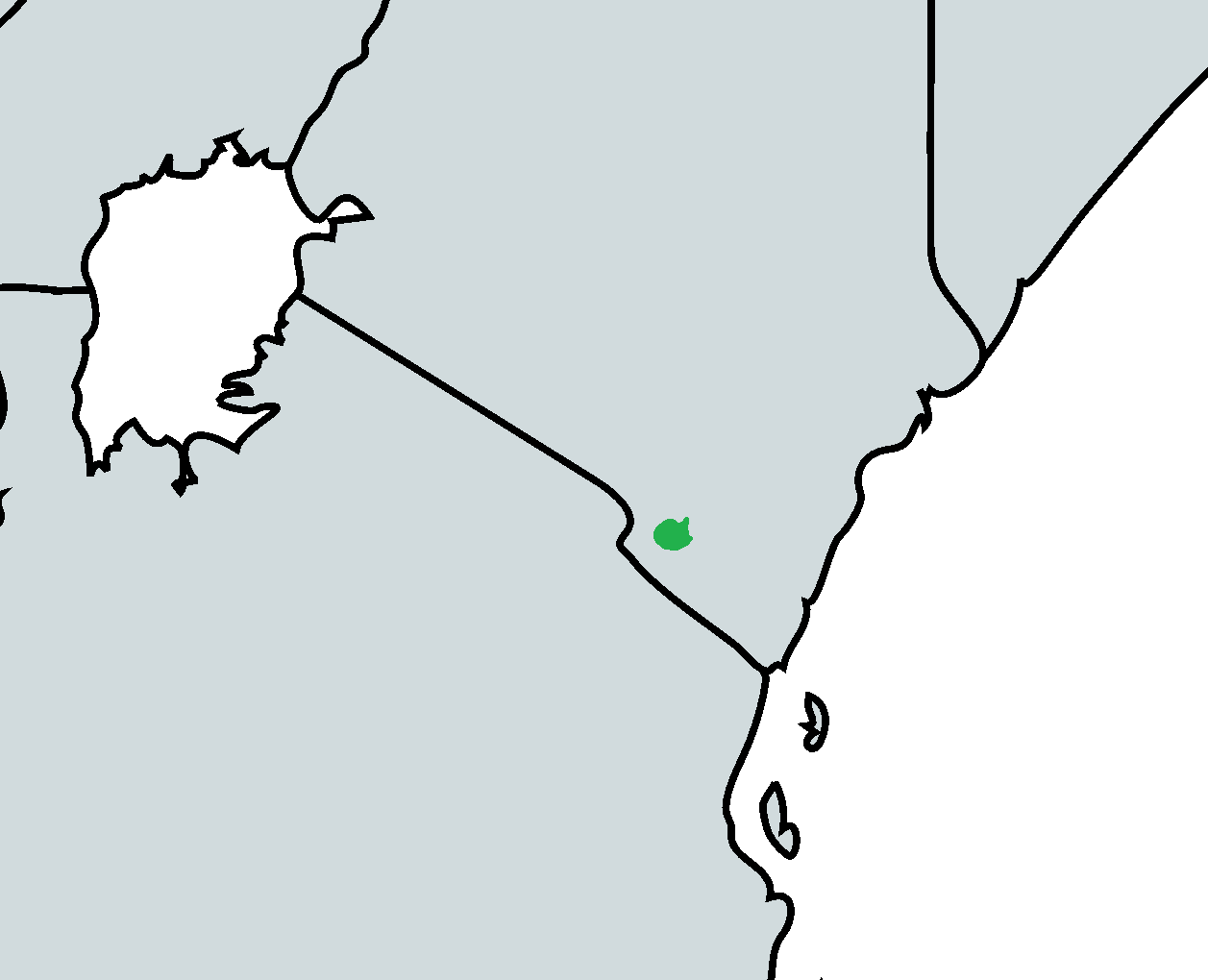

Synonyms
- Zosterops poliogastrus silvanus

= Taita white-eye =

Species of bird

Taita white-eye (Zosterops silvanus) is a species of bird in the family Zosteropidae. It includes numerous subspecies, sometimes considered a subspecies to montane white-eye (Z. poliogastrus). It is only found in Taita Hills in southeastern Kenya. IUCN categorizes it as vulnerable. It is threatened by severe habitat loss and fragmentation, mainly as a result of the deforestation of the Taita Hills.

It breeds in cloud forests.

It is often observed in mixed flocks with the pale white-eye.
