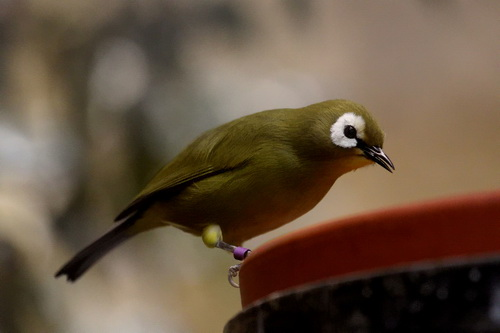
- In captivity at Tierpark Hagenbeck in Hamburg, Germany

Conservation status
- Least Concern (IUCN 3.1)

Scientific classification
- Domain: Eukaryota
- Kingdom: Animalia
- Phylum: Chordata
- Class: Aves
- Order: Passeriformes
- Family: Zosteropidae
- Genus: Zosterops
- Species: Z. eurycricotus

Binomial name
- Zosterops eurycricotus Fischer, G.A. & Reichenow, 1884

= Broad-ringed white-eye =

Bird species in the family Zosteropidae

The broad-ringed white-eye (Zosterops eurycricotus) or Kilimanjaro white-eye is a bird species in the family Zosteropidae. It is found in northeast Tanzania.

The broad-ringed white-eye was formerly considered a subspecies of the montane white-eye, now Heuglin's white-eye (Zosterops poliogastrus).

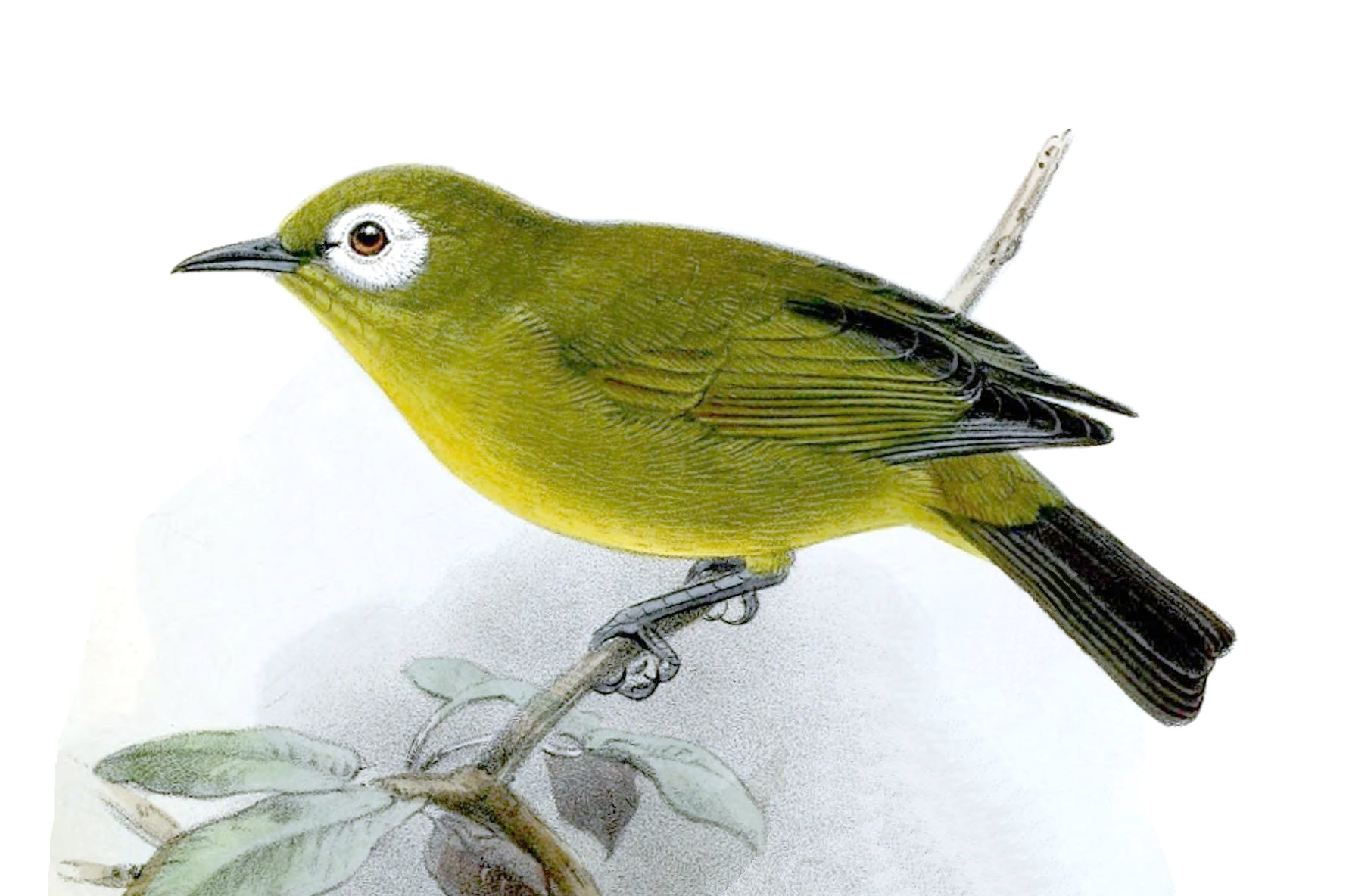
Illustration by Keulemans (1889)
