= Mbulu white-eye =

Conservation status
- Least Concern (IUCN 3.1)

Scientific classification
- Kingdom: Animalia
- Phylum: Chordata
- Class: Aves
- Order: Passeriformes
- Family: Zosteropidae
- Genus: Zosterops
- Species: Z. mbuluensis

Binomial name
- Zosterops mbuluensis Sclater, W.L. & Moreau, 1935

Species of bird

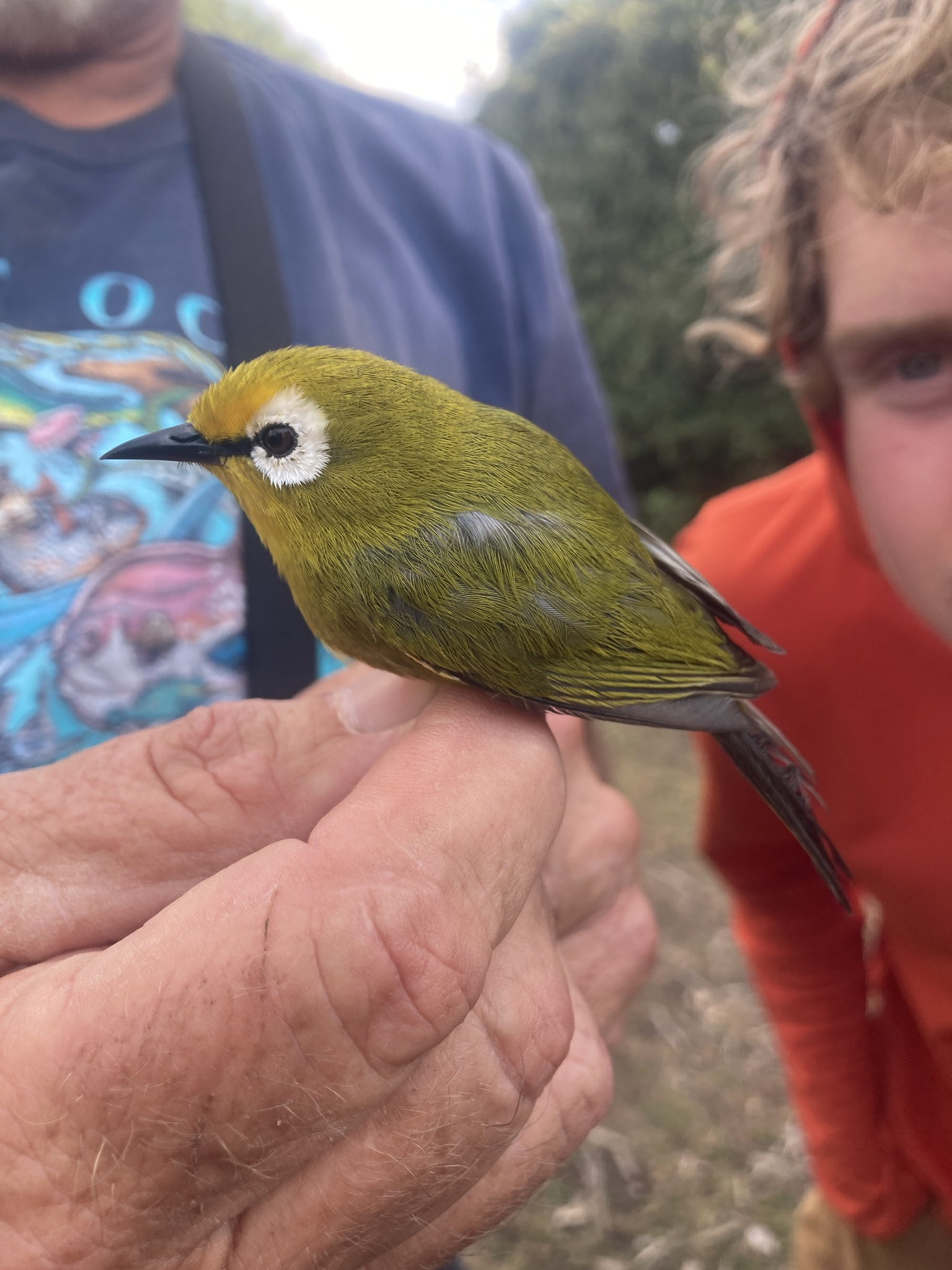
Picture of a Mbulu White-eye taken in Tanzania

The Mbulu white-eye (Zosterops mbuluensis) is a bird species in the family Zosteropidae. It is found in southern Kenya and northern Tanzania.

The Mbulu white-eye was formerly treated as a subspecies of the montane white-eye (Zosterops poliogastrus). When a molecular phylogenetic study published in 2014 found that it was more closely related to the Abyssinian white-eye (Zosterops abyssinicus), the Mbulu white-eye was promoted to species rank. It is monotypic.
