= Plesiotrygon nana =

Conservation status
- Near Threatened (IUCN 3.1)

Scientific classification
- Kingdom: Animalia
- Phylum: Chordata
- Class: Chondrichthyes
- Subclass: Elasmobranchii
- Order: Myliobatiformes
- Family: Potamotrygonidae
- Genus: Plesiotrygon
- Species: P. nana

Binomial name
- Plesiotrygon nana M. R. de Carvalho & Ragno, 2011

Species of cartilaginous fish

Plesiotrygon nana, the black-tailed antenna ray, is a species of freshwater stingray in the family Potamotrygonidae. It is native to the western Amazon basin in northeastern Peru, western Brazil (east to around the Purus mouth), southeastern Colombia, and possibly eastern Ecuador. It is found both in the mainstream of the Amazon and Putumayo Rivers and in smaller tributaries such as the Itaya and Pachitea Rivers. It is occasionally kept in aquariums and has been bred in captivity, but it is sensitive and the tail is easily damaged.

The black-tailed antenna ray is very long-tailed (tail length typically at least three times the disc width), similar to the only other member of the genus, the long-tailed river stingray (P. iwamae). The type specimen, an adult male, had a disc width of 24.7 cm (9.7 in), leading to speculations that the black-tailed antenna ray is the smallest member of the family ("nana" means small and it has also been referred to by the name dwarf antenna ray). However, a female kept at the Shedd Aquarium had a disc width of 38 cm (15 in), and later specimens caught in the wild have been up to 52 cm (20 in) in width and 12.4 kg (27 lb) in weight.
