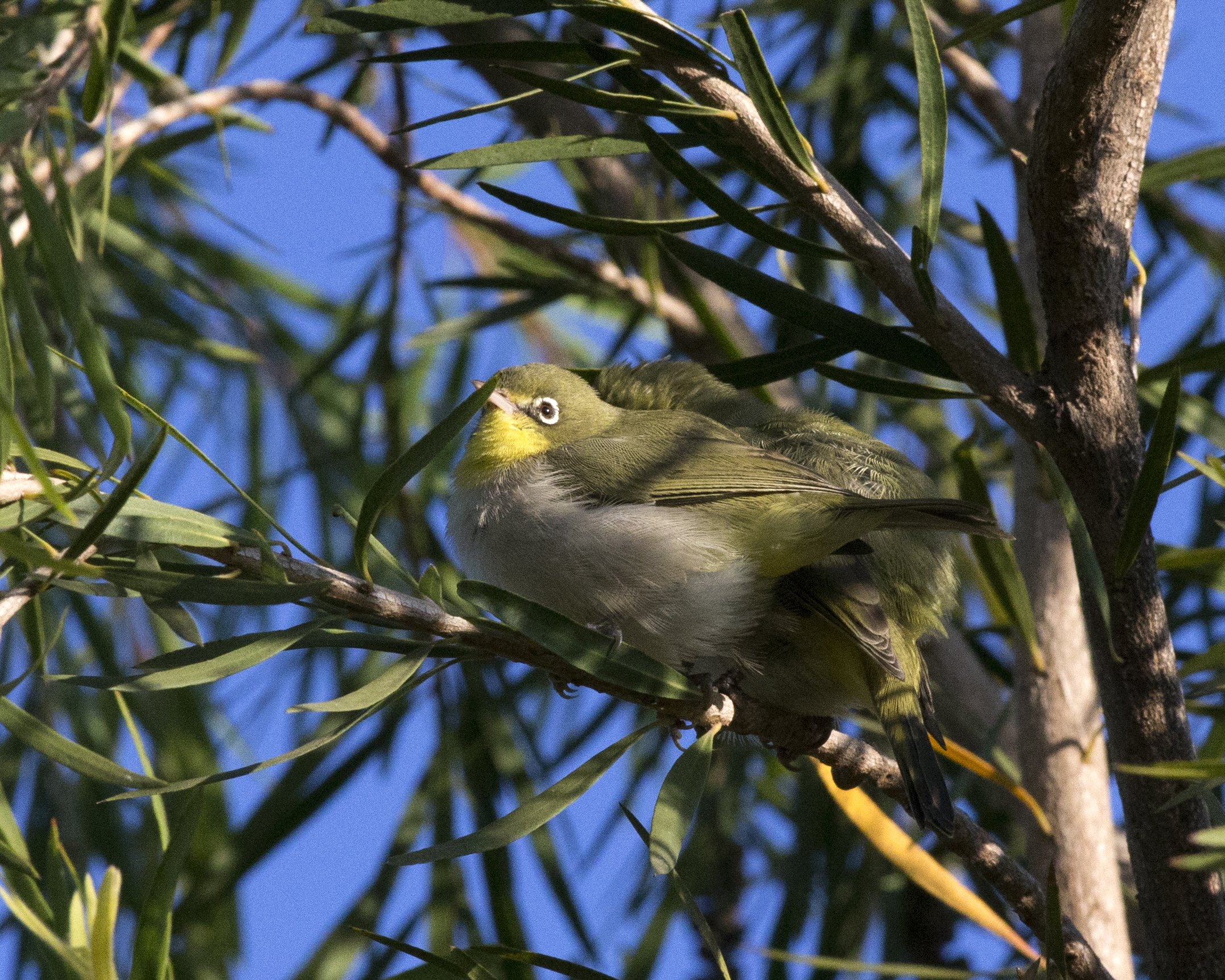
- At Lalibela, Ethiopia

Conservation status
- Least Concern (IUCN 3.1)

Scientific classification
- Kingdom: Animalia
- Phylum: Chordata
- Class: Aves
- Order: Passeriformes
- Family: Zosteropidae
- Genus: Zosterops
- Species: Z. poliogastrus

Binomial name
- Zosterops poliogastrus Heuglin, 1861

Synonyms
- Zosterops kulalensis Williams, 1947; Zosterops poliogaster Heuglin, 1861; Zosterops silvanus Peter & Loveridge, 1935; Zosterops winifredae Sclater, 1935

= Ethiopian white-eye =

Species of bird

The Ethiopian white-eye (Zosterops poliogastrus), formerly known as Heuglin's white-eye or montane white-eye, is a small passerine bird in the white-eye family Zosteropidae. It is native to the Ethiopian Highlands. Its natural habitats range from subtropical or tropical moist montane forests, to subtropical or tropical high-altitude shrubland, plantations, and rural gardens.

== Taxonomy ==
The Ethiopian white-eye was formally described and illustrated in 1861 by the German explorer and ornithologist Theodor von Heuglin based on specimens collected in the "high mountainous district of Abbyssinia". He placed it in the genus Zosterops and coined the binomial name Zosterops poliogastra. As Zosterops is masculine, this must be corrected to Zosterops poliogastrus. The genus name combines the Ancient Greek ζωστηρος/zōstēros meaning "belt" or "girdle" with ωπος/ōpos meaning "eye". The specific epithet poliogastrus combines the Ancient Greek πολιος/polios meaning "grey" with γαστηρ/gastēr, γαστρος/gastros meaning "belly".

The Ethiopian white-eye was formerly treated as a polytypic species with the English name "montane white-eye" or "broad-ringed white-eye". Based mainly of evidence from molecular phylogenetic studies, the subspecies were elevated to species rank. After the promotion of four species the English name was changed to "Heuglin's white-eye ". These four species were south Pare white-eye (Zosterops winifredae), Mbulu white-eye (Zosterops mbuluensis), Taita white-eye (Zosterops silvanus) and broad-ringed white-eye (Zosterops eurycricotus). Finally in 2024, when the Kafa white-eye (Zosterops kaffensis) was promoted, the English name was changed again to "Ethiopian white-eye". The Ethiopian white-eye is monotypic, no subspecies are recognised.

== Description ==
The Ethiopian white-eye has a vivid yellow head and crown that extends all the way to its white eyering and a narrow black line extending from the eye to its black beak. Underneath the beak, the rest of the head is yellow as well. The flight feathers are lime-green. The tips of the feathers then shift to a brownish black. The sexes are similar in appearance.

== Distribution and habitat ==
During the dry season, the Heuglin's white-eye are commonly found in large flocks of up to fifty birds. However, in the wet season, flocks of this size are only seen in the early mornings or late afternoons. The habitat generally consists of woodland and forest edges, as well as isolated cultivations. In these areas, they commonly live in younger growths or shorter trees. They live anywhere from 1340 to 3640 meters.

== Diet ==
The diet mainly consists of berries and small insects. However, in the months of September and November they can be found foraging on Leonotis flowers. During the dry season, this bird is mainly frugivorous, while insectivorous in the wet season.
