= Brown stingray =

Brown stingray may refer to:

- Red stingray (Hemitrygon akajei)
- Estuary stingray (Hemitrygon fluviorum)
- Broad stingray (Bathytoshia lata)
- Jenkins' whipray (Pateobatis jenkinsii)
- Plain maskray (Neotrygon annotata)

See also:

- Brown whipray (Maculabatis toshi)
- Brown stingaree (Urolophus westraliensis)
