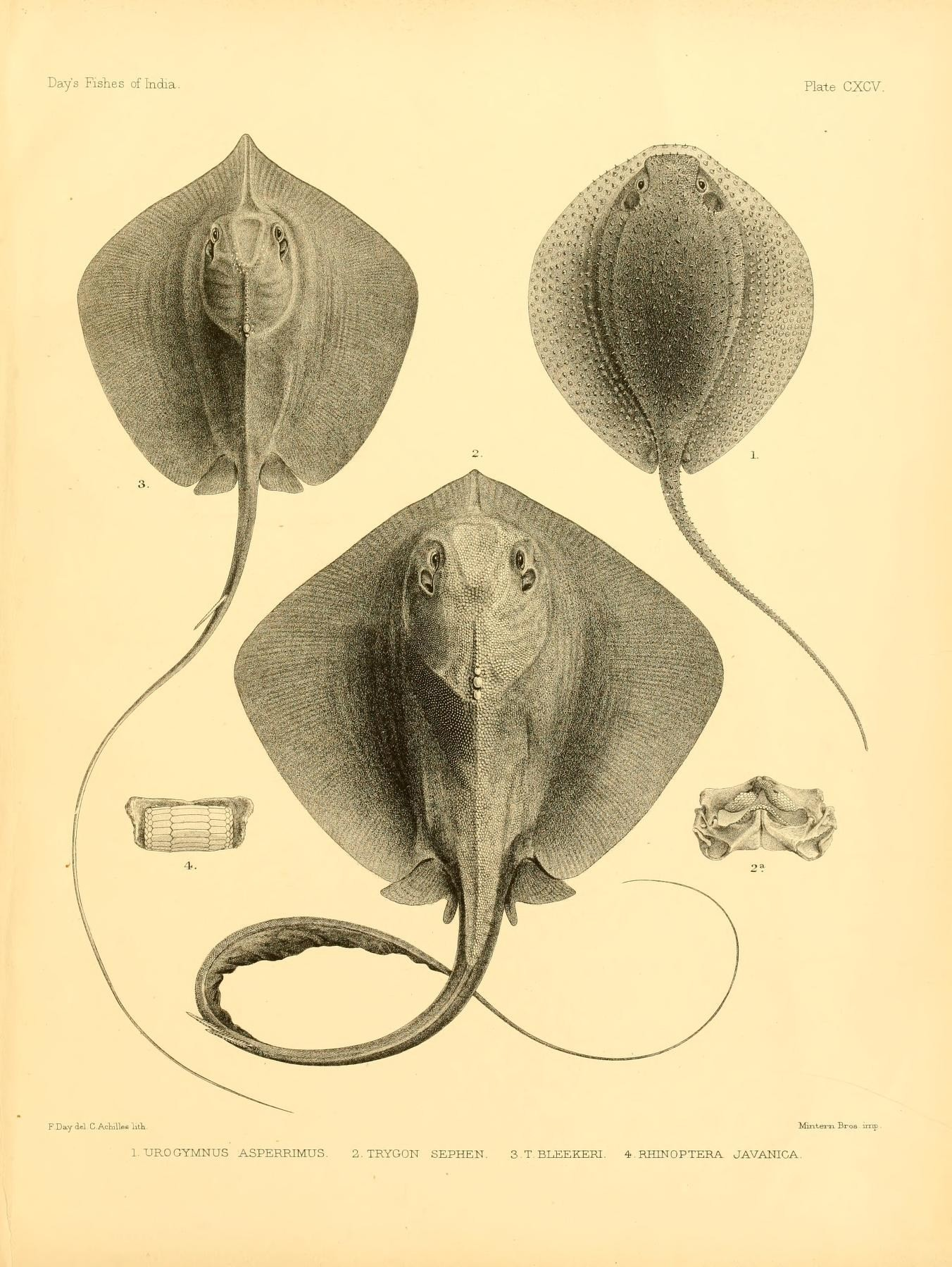
- P. bleekeri is no.3 (top left)

Conservation status
- Endangered (IUCN 3.1)

Scientific classification
- Kingdom: Animalia
- Phylum: Chordata
- Class: Chondrichthyes
- Subclass: Elasmobranchii
- Order: Myliobatiformes
- Family: Dasyatidae
- Genus: Pateobatis
- Species: P. bleekeri

Binomial name
- Pateobatis bleekeri (Blyth, 1860)

Synonyms
- Dasyatis bleekeri (Blyth, 1860); Himantura bleekeri (Blyth, 1860); Trygon bleekeri Blyth, 1860

= Pateobatis bleekeri =

Bleeker's whipray

Species of cartilaginous fish

Pateobatis bleekeri, commonly known as Bleeker's whipray, is a species of stingray in the family Dasyatidae native to the Indian Ocean, where it is found in shallow coastal waters.

This species was named in honour of Dutch ichthyologist Pieter Bleeker in 1860. It has previously been considered a synonym of the Whitenose whipray, but has now been resurrected as a valid species.

== Distribution and habitat ==
This whipray is found in the northern Indian Ocean, its range extending from Pakistan to Myanmar; it is a demersal fish and is usually found over soft substrates in water that is shallower than 30 m (100 ft).
