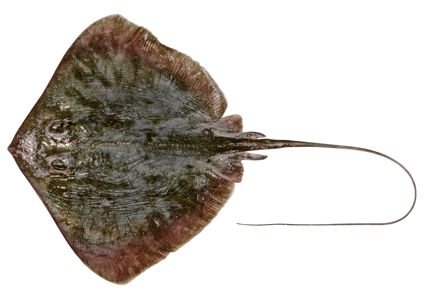

Conservation status
- Data Deficient (IUCN 3.1)

Scientific classification
- Kingdom: Animalia
- Phylum: Chordata
- Class: Chondrichthyes
- Subclass: Elasmobranchii
- Order: Myliobatiformes
- Family: Dasyatidae
- Genus: Hemitrygon
- Species: H. parvonigra

Binomial name
- Hemitrygon parvonigra (Last & W. T. White, 2008)

= Dwarf black stingray =

Species of cartilaginous fish

The dwarf black stingray (Hemitrygon parvonigra) is a little-known species of stingray in the family Dasyatidae, found off northwestern Australia and perhaps throughout Southeast Asia at depths of 60–185 m (197–607 ft). Growing to a width of 51 cm (20 in), this species is characterized by an angular, diamond-shaped pectoral fin disc with a short row of spear-like thorns along the midline of the back and few dermal denticles elsewhere. Its tail bears a long fin fold along the bottom and a much shorter ridge along the top, both past the stinging spine. Plain brownish in color above, this ray can range from light to very dark. In some parts of its range, this species is occasionally caught incidentally by fisheries and sold for meat.

== Taxonomy ==
Peter Last and William White described the dwarf black stingray in a 2008 Commonwealth Scientific and Industrial Research Organisation (CSIRO) publication; it had previously been termed Dasyatis "sp. A". The new stingray was given the specific epithet parvonigra, from the Latin parvus ("little") and nigra ("black"), because of its superficial resemblance to the much larger black stingray (B. thetidis). The type specimen is a male 38 cm (15 in) across, collected north of Cape Lambert in Western Australia. This species seems to be most related to the longtail stingray (H. longus), and belongs to a poorly known species complex that also includes the red stingray (H. akajei).

== Distribution and habitat ==
The dwarf black stingray has been found off northwestern Australia (north of Port Hedland), Indonesia (including Bali and Sabah in Borneo), and Malaysia. Possible records also exist off West Papua and the Philippines, suggesting it has a wide range. Australian rays inhabit the outer continental shelf at a depth of 125–185 m (410–607 ft), while Indonesian rays occur over insular and continental shelves at a depth of 60–125 m (197–410 ft). It is bottom-dwelling in nature.

== Description ==
The dwarf black stingray has a diamond-shaped pectoral fin disc slightly wider than long, with rather angular outer corners and nearly straight anterior corners. The snout is a broadly triangular, with a pointed tip. The eyes are large and elevated, and immediately followed by larger spiracles. There is a wide, skirt-shaped curtain of skin with a minutely fringed posterior margin between the short, oval nostrils. The medium-sized mouth forms a strong arch, and contains four papillae (nipple-like structures) across the floor and an additional, tiny papilla near the corner of each jaw. The teeth are small and number approximately 43 rows in either jaw; those toward the center of the jaw have long, thin cusps, while those toward the corners have very low crowns. The five pairs of gill slits are slightly S-shaped. The pelvic fins are small with nearly straight margins; males have rather flattened claspers.

The tail measures around 1.5 times as long as the disc and is relatively broad and flattened at the base. One, rarely two serrated stinging spines are dorsally placed about a third of a disc width back from the tail base. Beyond the sting, the tail becomes thin and whip-like, bearing a long, low ventral fin fold and a much shorter dorsal ridge. There is a short row of closely spaced, spear-shaped thorns along the midline of the back, starting behind the head; 1–2 small, seed-shaped thorns are also present on each "shoulder". This species is a plain ochre to dark grayish brown above, becoming lighter towards the disc margins, on the thorns, and past the sting, and white below. Reaching 51 cm (20 in) across and 1.1 m (3.6 ft) long, the dwarf black stingray is less than a third as wide as the 1.8 m (5.9 ft) wide black stingray. The two species also differ in denticle coverage and meristic counts.

== Biology and ecology ==
Virtually nothing is known of the dwarf black stingray's natural history. It is presumably aplacental viviparous, with the developing embryos sustained by maternally produced histotroph ("uterine milk") as in other stingrays. Males attain sexual maturity at around 35 cm (14 in) across.

== Human interactions ==
The International Union for Conservation of Nature (IUCN) has not assessed the status of the dwarf black stingray. In Indonesian waters, it contributes to the bycatch of bottom trawl and trammel net fisheries, and is sold for meat.
