= Yantai stingray =

Conservation status
- Vulnerable (IUCN 3.1)

Scientific classification
- Kingdom: Animalia
- Phylum: Chordata
- Class: Chondrichthyes
- Subclass: Elasmobranchii
- Order: Myliobatiformes
- Family: Dasyatidae
- Genus: Hemitrygon
- Species: H. laevigata

Binomial name
- Hemitrygon laevigata (Y. T. Chu, 1960)

Species of cartilaginous fish

The Yantai stingray (Hemitrygon laevigata; often misgendered laevigatus), is a little-known species of stingray in the family Dasyatidae, inhabiting shallow waters in the northwestern Pacific Ocean off the coasts of China and Japan. Measuring no more than 20–30 cm (7.9–11.8 in) across, this species is characterized by its diamond-shaped pectoral fin disc wider than long, completely smooth skin, dorsal coloration of dark irregular spots on a yellowish gray-brown background, and ventral coloration of more spots on a white background with yellowish margins. One of the three most common stingrays sold for food in China, the slow-reproducing Yantai stingray faces possible overfishing and habitat degradation, and its numbers appear to be declining. The International Union for Conservation of Nature (IUCN) has assessed it as vulnerable.

== Taxonomy ==
The Yantai stingray was described by Yuanting Chu in his 1960 Cartilaginous Fishes of China, based on specimens obtained from the Shanghai Fish Market, Dongfushan, and Huaniao.

== Distribution and habitat ==
The Yantai stingray is found in the Yellow Sea and the East China Sea, as far north as Japan and as far south as the Taiwan Strait; it is reportedly abundant off southern Japan and northern China. This bottom-dwelling species inhabits inshore waters to a depth of 50 m (160 ft), and has been known to enter estuaries.

== Description ==
A small species, male and female Yantai stingrays grow to no more than 20 cm (7.9 in) and 30 cm (12 in) across respectively. Its pectoral fin disc is diamond-shaped and 1.2–1.3 times wider than long, with nearly straight anterior margins converging to a blunt-angled snout, and rounded outer margins. The large, protruding eyes are immediately followed by a pair of equal-sized or slightly smaller, elliptical spiracles. There is a flap of skin between the nares that reaches the mouth, with a straight and fringed rear margin. The mouth is small and bow-shaped, with three papillae across the floor. The teeth are arranged with a quincunx pattern into pavement-like surfaces; the teeth of adult males have a sharp recurved cusp, while those of females and juveniles are blunt. There are around 40 tooth rows in the upper jaw. The five pairs of gill slits are short.

The pelvic fins are almost rectangular in shape, with those of females being wider and more strongly curved posteriorly than those of males. The tail measures 1.4–1.8 times the disc length and is laterally compressed, becoming whip-like towards the tip. The stinging tail spine measures about 42 mm (1.7 in) long and bears on average 60 serrations. Following the spine is a short, narrow dorsal fin fold and a wider ventral fin fold running along two-fifths of the tail. The skin is completely devoid of dermal denticles even in adults. The disc is yellowish gray-brown above, with irregular darker blotches and yellow marks adjacent to the eyes and spiracles; the underside is white with irregular darker spots and a yellowish gray margin. The tail is dark brown with a yellow lateral stripe and black fin folds.

== Biology and ecology ==
Little is known of the Yantai stingray's natural history. Like other stingrays, it is aplacental viviparous with females probably giving birth to only 1–2 pups at a time.

== Human interactions ==
Although generally innocuous towards humans, fishery workers have been injured by the venomous tail spine of the Yantai stingray. Envenomation by this species causes intense pain and edema, can lead to weakness, nausea, arrhythmia, paresthesia, and convulsions, and may even be fatal. Yantai stingrays are taken by coastal benthic commercial fisheries as bycatch. In Japan, where it is often mistaken for the red stingray (D. akajei), its small size typically results in captured individuals being discarded. Such is not the case in China, where the Yantai stingray is one of the three most common stingrays brought to market.

The International Union for Conservation of Nature (IUCN) has listed the Yantai stingray as vulnerable, as with its slow reproductive rate its population is unlikely to withstand the intense fishing pressure present throughout both the Yellow and East China Seas. Furthermore, its habitat is threatened by widespread coastal development in the region. Anecdotal reports suggest that the Yantai stingray is significantly less common now in Chinese markets than it was in the past.
