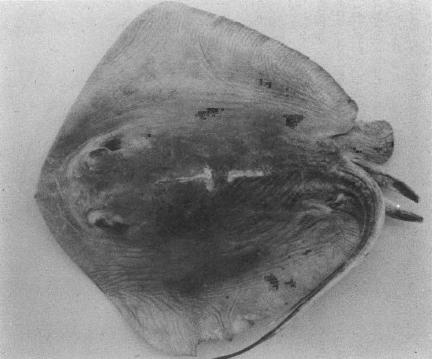
- Holotype

Conservation status
- Vulnerable (IUCN 3.1)

Scientific classification
- Kingdom: Animalia
- Phylum: Chordata
- Class: Chondrichthyes
- Subclass: Elasmobranchii
- Order: Myliobatiformes
- Family: Dasyatidae
- Genus: Hemitrygon
- Species: H. izuensis

Binomial name
- Hemitrygon izuensis (K. Nishida & Nakaya, 1988)

= Izu stingray =

Species of cartilaginous fish

The Izu stingray (Hemitrygon izuensis) is a little-known species of stingray in the family Dasyatidae, endemic to the Izu Peninsula of Japan. Found in shallow coastal waters, it is a fairly small species with a smooth, golden-brown, diamond-shaped pectoral fin disc and a whip-like tail with a low keel above and fin fold beneath. The fin fold is white, distinguishing the Izu stingray from all other Pacific members of its family.

== Taxonomy ==
The Izu stingray was described by Kiyonori Nishida and Kazuhiro Nakaya in a 1988 issue of the Japanese Journal of Ichthyology. Its specific epithet izuensis refers to where the type specimen, a 42 cm (17 in) wide adult male, was caught.

== Distribution and habitat ==
The Izu stingray occurs only off the Izu Peninsula on the eastern coast of the Japanese main island Honshū. This bottom-dwelling species inhabits waters close to shore, at depths of 10–20 m (33–66 ft).

== Description ==
The largest Izu stingray on record measures 42 cm (17 in) across. The pectoral fin disc is diamond-shaped, slightly wider than long, with gently convex forward margins and a blunt snout. The eyes are medium-sized and followed by large spiracles. A flap of skin with a fringed trailing margin is present between the nares. There are 35–41 tooth rows in the upper jaw and 37–39 tooth rows in the lower jaw; the teeth have a pavement-like quincunx arrangement and are blunt in females and juveniles but somewhat pointed in mature males. A transverse row of 5 papillae (nipple-like structures), with the 2 outermost slimmer than the others, is found on the floor of the mouth.

The pelvic fins are broad and triangular. The tail is whip-like, about as long as the disc, and bears 1 (sometimes 2) stinging spines on top. The spine has a short groove and typically measures 6.8 cm (2.7 in) long in males and 7.9 cm (3.1 in) in females, with 112 and 130 serrations respectively. Following the spine, there is a short and slight dorsal keel and a ventral fin fold. The skin is completely smooth, other than 2–6 small tubercles located before the spine in the largest individuals. The coloration is golden brown above, darkening between the eyes and on the last two-thirds of the tail, and white below, darkening towards the fin margins. Unlike all other stingrays in the Pacific, the ventral tail fold is white rather than dark.

== Biology and ecology ==
Virtually nothing is known of the natural history of the Izu stingray. It attains sexual maturity at a disc width of around 37 cm (15 in).

== Human interactions ==
Fewer than 10 Izu stingrays are known to have been collected. The International Union for Conservation of Nature (IUCN) has assessed this species as Vulnerable, citing its small geographic distribution and susceptibility to being caught unintentionally in bottom trawls and set nets used by Japanese coastal fisheries.
