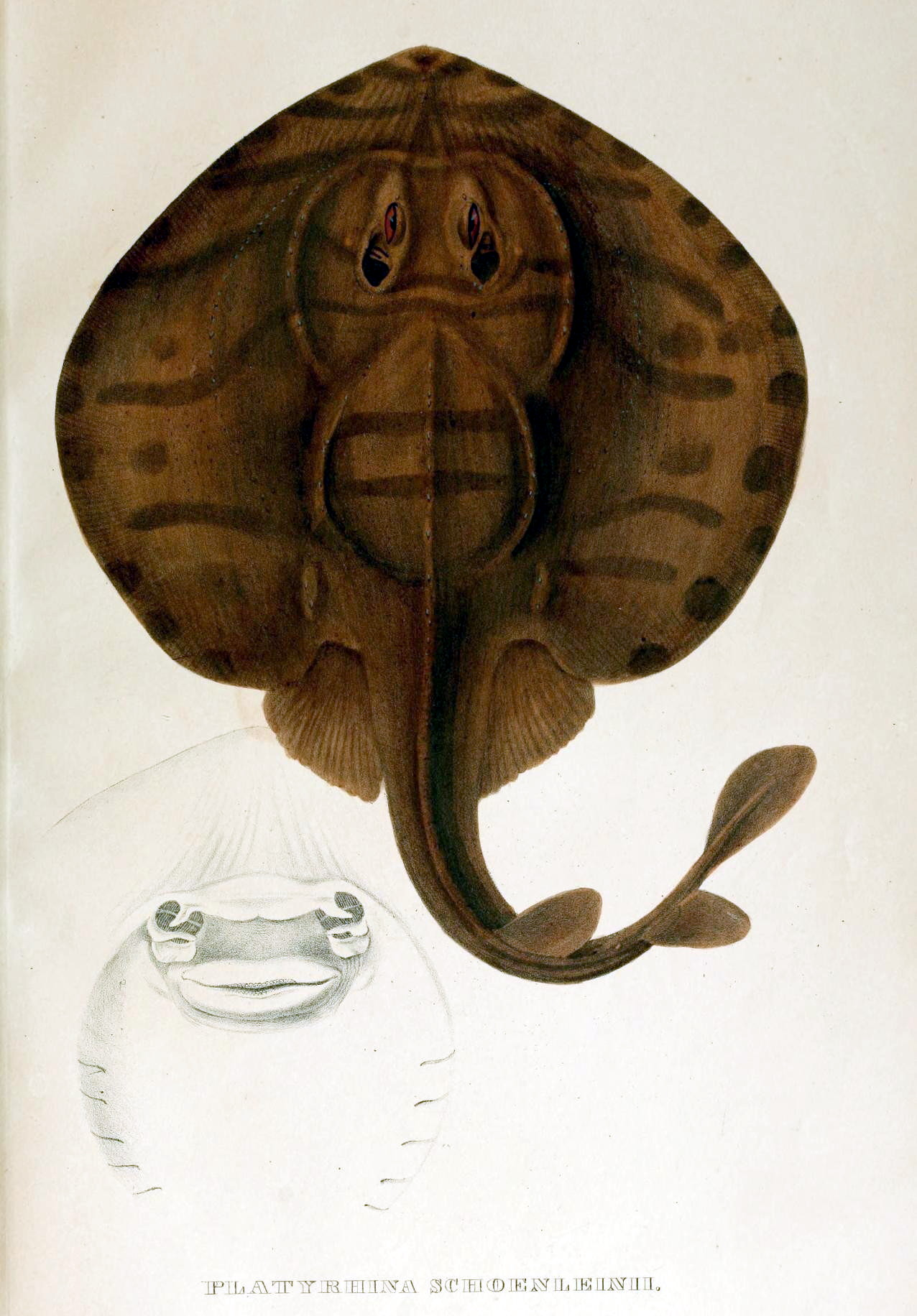

Conservation status
- Vulnerable (IUCN 3.1)

Scientific classification
- Kingdom: Animalia
- Phylum: Chordata
- Class: Chondrichthyes
- Subclass: Elasmobranchii
- Order: Myliobatiformes
- Family: Zanobatidae
- Genus: Zanobatus
- Species: Z. schoenleinii

Binomial name
- Zanobatus schoenleinii (J. P. Müller & Henle, 1841)

Synonyms
- Discobatus schoenleinii (Müller & Henle, 1841); Platyrhina schoenleinii J. P. Müller & Henle, 1841; Platyrhinoidis atlantica Chabanaud, 1928; Platyrhinoidis schoenleinii (Müller & Henle, 1841); Zanobatus atlantica (Chabanaud, 1928); Zanobatus atlanticus (Chabanaud, 1928)

= Zanobatus schoenleinii =

Species of cartilaginous fish

Zanobatus schoenleinii, the striped panray, is a species of ray in the family Zanobatidae. It was considered the only species in its genus and family until the description of the Zanobatus maculatus in 2016.

The striped panray is found in the warm East Atlantic Ocean, ranging from Morocco, through the Gulf of Guinea to Angola. It mainly occurs over sandy bottoms at depths of less than 15 m (50 ft), but may occur as deep as 60–100 m (200–300 ft).

Adults are typically 40–50 cm (1.3–1.6 ft) long and the likely maximum length is around 60 cm (2.0 ft), although there have been claims of individuals up to 1 m (3.3 ft). Its upperparts are brownish with a distinct dark blotched and barred pattern. It resembles the maculate panray, but that species is only known from the Gulf of Guinea (Ivory Coast to Gabon), is smaller (up to around 36 cm or 1.18 ft), has a less striped pattern and a more thorny back.

Little is known about the biology of the striped panray and the IUCN has assessed it as being Vulnerable. It feeds on benthic invertebrates and it is ovoviviparous, giving birth to 1–4 young that are about 19 cm (7.5 in) long.
