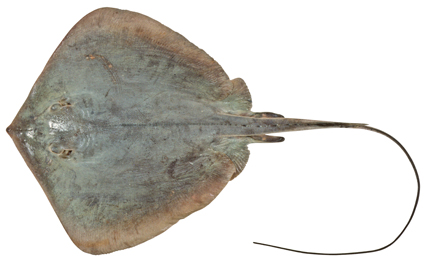

Conservation status
- Vulnerable (IUCN 3.1)

Scientific classification
- Kingdom: Animalia
- Phylum: Chordata
- Class: Chondrichthyes
- Subclass: Elasmobranchii
- Order: Myliobatiformes
- Family: Dasyatidae
- Genus: Hemitrygon
- Species: H. fluviorum

Binomial name
- Hemitrygon fluviorum (J. D. Ogilby, 1908)
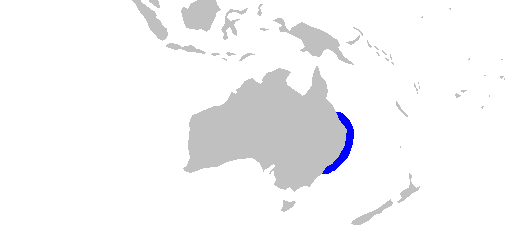
- Geographic range

= Estuary stingray =

Species of cartilaginous fish

The estuary stingray (Hemitrygon fluviorum), also called the estuary stingaree or brown stingray, is a species of stingray in the family Dasyatidae. Endemic to eastern Australia, it typically inhabits shallow, mangrove-lined tidal rivers, estuaries, and bays in southern Queensland and New South Wales. This yellow-brown to olive ray grows to at least 93 cm (37 in) across. It has a diamond-shaped pectoral fin disc and a mostly smooth, whip-like tail bearing both dorsal and ventral fin folds. It can additionally be identified by its long, narrow nostrils and the row of thorns along the midline of its back.

While the estuary stingray has gained infamy for consuming farmed shellfish such as oysters, it mainly feeds on crustaceans and polychaete worms. It is aplacental viviparous, with the unborn young sustained to term by maternal histotroph ("uterine milk"). Once common, this species has apparently declined across much of its range, likely from a combination of habitat degradation, mortality from commercial and recreational fishing, and persecution by shellfish farmers. As a result, the International Union for Conservation of Nature (IUCN) has assessed it as Near Threatened.

== Taxonomy ==
The first reference to the estuary stingray in scientific literature was probably a record by 19th-century English naturalist William Saville-Kent of a "Trygon pastinaca" feeding on oysters in a Queensland estuary. This species was formally described by Australian ichthyologist James Douglas Ogilby in a 1908 volume of Proceedings of the Royal Society of Queensland, based on a specimen collected from the Brisbane River. The specific epithet fluviorum means "of the rivers" in Latin.

== Description ==
The estuary stingray has a diamond-shaped pectoral fin disc about as wide as long, with gently convex anterior margins and broadly rounded outer corners. The snout is wide and triangular, and tapers to a point. The small, widely spaced eyes are immediately followed by the spiracles. Between the long and narrow nostrils, there is a short and broad "skirt" of skin with a weakly fringed posterior margin. The small, bow-shaped mouth is surrounded by deep furrows and contains a row of five papillae across the floor, with the outermost pair tiny and set apart from the others. The teeth are small and arranged into pavement-like surfaces. There are five pairs of gill slits beneath the disc. The pelvic fins are relatively large.

The tail measures twice as long as the disc, and is broad and flattened at the base. On its upper surface is at least one, often two serrated stinging spines. Past the spines, the tail quickly tapers to become whip-like and bears a well-developed keel above and a long, low fin fold beneath. There are wide patches of small dermal denticles with flattened crowns between the eyes and over the middle of the back, along with a midline row of enlarged thorns that become progressively longer until they reach the base of the sting. Aside from the thorns at the base, the tail is smooth. This species is yellowish to greenish brown above, lightening towards the disc margins and darkening past the tail spine, and white below. It grows to at least 93 cm (37 in) across, and possibly reaches a width of 1.2 m (3.9 ft). Its maximum recorded weight is 6.1 kg (13 lb).

== Distribution and habitat ==
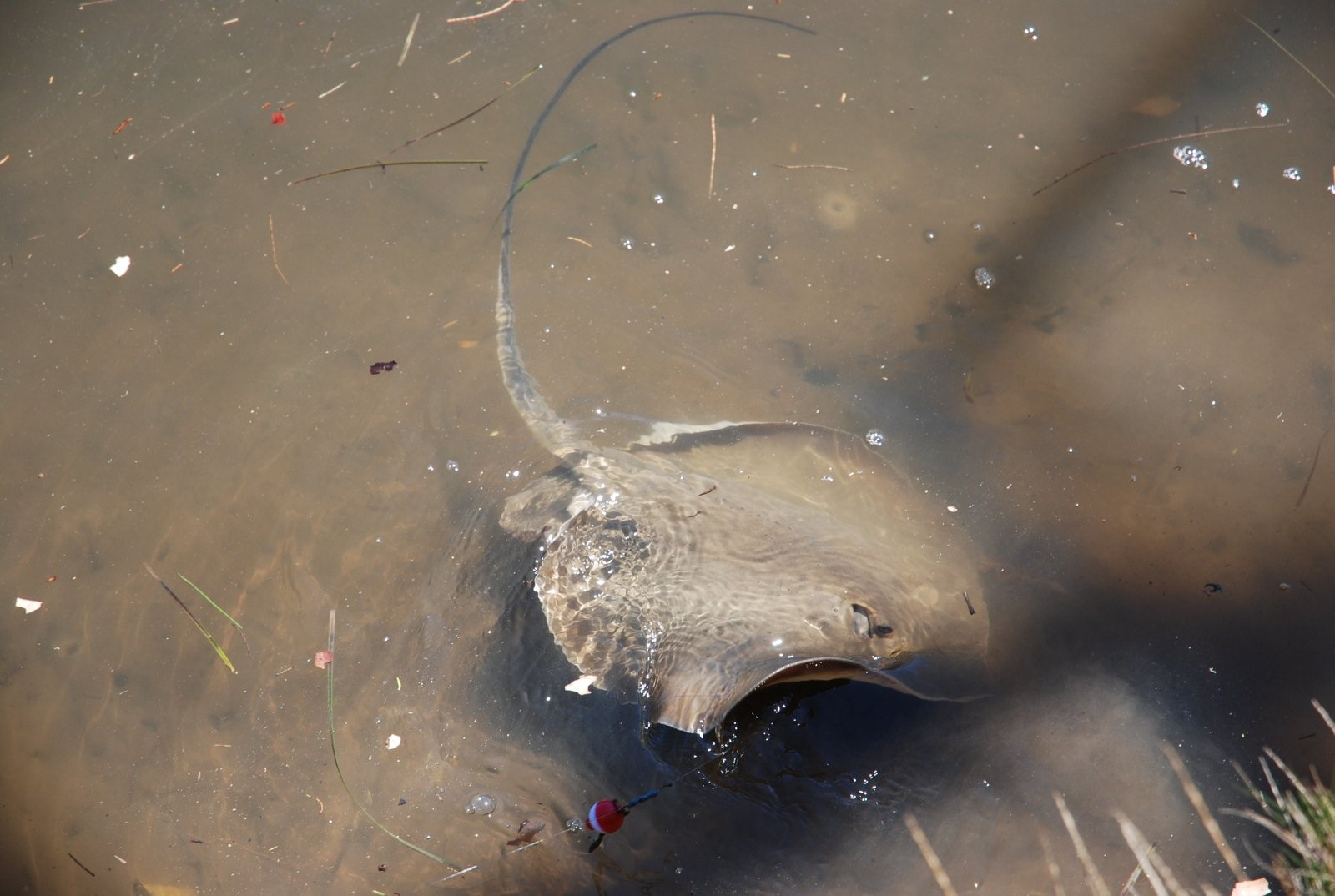
The estuary stingray inhabits shallow waters with fine sediment.

The range of the estuary stingray spans approximately 1,700 km (1,100 mi) along Australia's eastern coast, from Repulse Bay in Queensland to the Hacking River in New South Wales. It is most common in southern Queensland, including in Hervey Bay and Moreton Bay. This species was formerly suspected to have disappeared from Botany Bay and Port Jackson in the 1880s, but recent observations have shown this is not the case. Additional species records from the Cape York Peninsula, Northern Territory, New Guinea, and the South China Sea probably represent misidentifications of other stingrays, primarily the freshwater whipray (Himantura dalyensis) and the Merauke stingray (D. longicauda).

The habitat requirements of the estuary stingray appear to be rather stringent, as significant numbers are only found at particular locations. It prefers tidal rivers and the intertidal flats of estuaries and bays, which are lined with mangroves and have sandy to muddy bottoms. This species is rarely found outside these sheltered areas, though it has been recorded to a depth of 28 m (92 ft) in offshore waters. It inhabits marine and brackish waters, and may be able to tolerate fresh water as well as it has been known to swim upriver beyond the limit of high tide. Surface water temperatures within its range vary from 24–29 °C (75–84 °F) in the north to 17–23 °C (63–73 °F) in the south. This species seems to segregate by size and sex.

== Biology and ecology ==
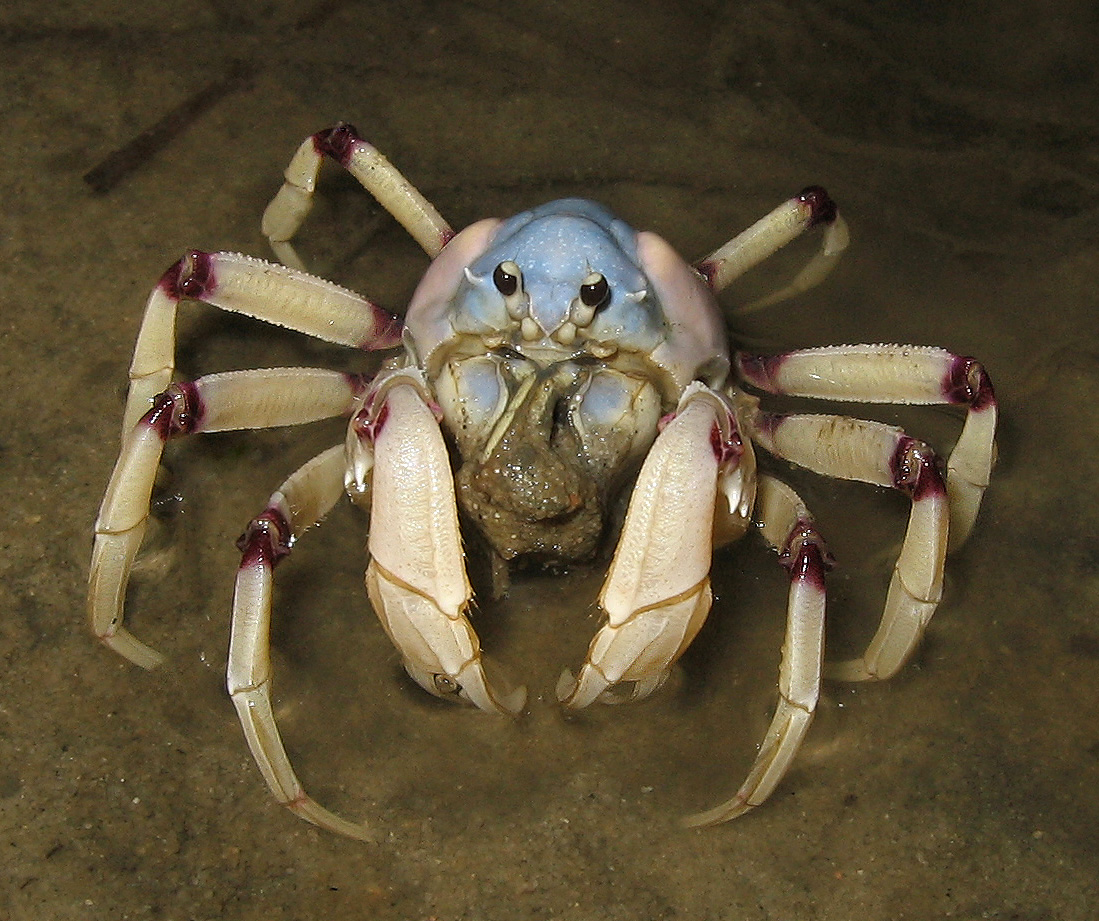
The soldier crab is an important prey species of the estuary stingray.

Despite its reputation for preying voraciously on oysters and other farmed shellfish, the estuary stingray's diet in fact consists mainly of crustaceans and polychaete worms. In Moreton Bay, an important prey species is the soldier crab (Mictyris longicarpus). This ray has been observed entering mudflats with the rising tide to forage for food. Known parasites of the estuary stingray include the tapeworm Shirleyrhynchus aetobatidis, the nematode Echinocephalus overstreeti and the monogeneans Heterocotyle chin, Empruthotrema dasyatidis and Neoentobdella cribbi.

Like other stingrays, the estuary stingray exhibits aplacental viviparity, with the developing embryos sustained initially by yolk and later by histotroph ("uterine milk") produced by the mother. Females probably produce offspring every year. Courtship, in which the male follows the female and bites her disc, has been observed at night in water approximately 80 cm (31 in) deep in Hays Inlet from July to October. The newborns measure around 11 cm (4.3 in) across and 35 cm (14 in) long. Young rays have been caught in the Nerang and Macleay Rivers and in Hays Inlet; such fresh or brackish environments may serve as nurseries. Males mature at around 41 cm (16 in) across and seven years of age, and females mature at around 63 cm (25 in) across and 13 years of age. This disparity in maturation size between the sexes is among the widest known for stingrays. The maximum lifespan is estimated to be 16 years for males and 23 years for females.

== Human interactions ==
Historical and anecdotal evidence strongly suggest that the once-abundant estuary stingray has declined substantially across its range. Although it is not commercially utilized, it faces a number of other threats. This species is captured incidentally by commercial bottom trawl and gillnet fisheries; bycatch mortality is exacerbated by the practice of "spiking", in which the ray's cranium is pierced with a metal bar or sharpened stick so as to move it. It is also readily caught, and often killed, by recreational anglers. Surveys in Moreton Bay have found fishing-related effects, such as embedded hooks and mutilated tails, in over 10% of the population. Habitat degradation is another major threat to the estuary stingray, especially given its habitat specificity. Its range encompasses some of the most urbanized areas in Australia, where there is extensive land reclamation, water pollution, and construction of flood mitigation barriers on rivers. Finally, this ray's reputation for damaging shellfish has led to persecution by commercial shellfish farmers.

The estuary stingray's diminished population and susceptibility to multiple threats have led the International Union for Conservation of Nature (IUCN) to assess it as Near Threatened. Demographic modelling has shown that it is likely to become Endangered without intervention. Several Marine Protected Areas (MPAs) are located within its range, but at present they lack adequate protection from fishing. As this ray remains locally abundant in Hervey Bay and parts of Moreton Bay, these areas may become important centers for preserving the species. The Queensland government has listed the estuary stingray on the Back on Track species prioritisation framework, to facilitate the development of conservation measures.
