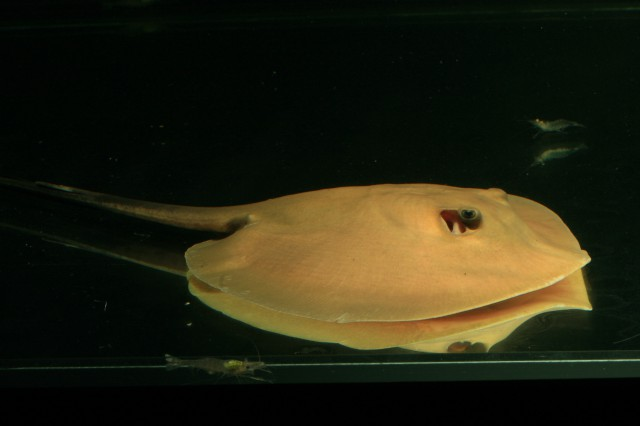

Conservation status
- Endangered (IUCN 3.1)

Scientific classification
- Kingdom: Animalia
- Phylum: Chordata
- Class: Chondrichthyes
- Subclass: Elasmobranchii
- Order: Myliobatiformes
- Family: Dasyatidae
- Genus: Hemitrygon
- Species: H. laosensis

Binomial name
- Hemitrygon laosensis (T. R. Roberts & Karnasuta, 1987)

= Mekong freshwater stingray =

Species of cartilaginous fish

The Mekong freshwater stingray, Hemitrygon laosensis, is a species of stingray in the family Dasyatidae, restricted to the Mekong and Chao Phraya Rivers in Laos and Thailand; the occurrence in Chao Phraya is considered an introduction. Measuring up to 62 cm (24 in) across, this ray has an oval pectoral fin disc, a tail with both upper and lower fin folds, and a midline row of spine-like dermal denticles. A characteristic feature of this species is its bright orange underside. The Mekong freshwater stingray preys on invertebrates and is aplacental viviparous. It has been assessed as Endangered by the International Union for Conservation of Nature (IUCN), as it is threatened by overfishing and habitat degradation.

== Taxonomy and phylogeny ==
The Mekong freshwater stingray was first recognized as a new species by Yasuhiko Taki, who included it as "Dasyatis sp." in his 1968 list of Mekong River fishes from Laos. Taki's specimens were subsequently lost, and this ray was not formally described until 1987, by Tyson Roberts and Jaranthada Karnasuta, in the scientific journal Environmental Biology of Fishes. The type specimen is an immature male 23 cm (9.1 in) across, caught from the Mekong in Chiang Rai Province, Thailand. A 1999 phylogenetic analysis, based on cytochrome b sequences, found that the Mekong freshwater stingray is closely related to an undescribed dasyatid species from the Gulf of Thailand.

== Distribution and habitat ==
An exclusive inhabitant of large, freshwater rivers, the Mekong freshwater stingray has only been recorded from sandy habitats in the Mekong River along the Laos-Thailand border, and in the Chao Phraya River near Chai Nat in central Thailand. The populations of these two rivers are likely isolated from each other.

== Description ==
The pectoral fin disc of the Mekong freshwater stingray is oval in shape and slightly longer than wide. The tip of the snout protrudes slightly past the disc. The eyes are small and followed by somewhat larger spiracles. There are 28–38 upper tooth rows and 33–41 lower tooth rows; the teeth of juveniles and females are blunt, while those of adult males are pointed with a central keel. The jaws of adult males also become strongly curved. A row of 5 papillae lie across the floor of the mouth, with the outermost pair smaller than the others. The five pairs of gill slits are short. The pelvic fins are longer than wide and triangular with rounded corners. The whip-like tail is no longer than twice the disc width and bears 1 (rarely 2) stinging spines on the upper surface. Both dorsal and ventral fin folds are found behind the spine, with the ventral fold 2.5–3 times longer than the upper fold.

A single row of thornlike dermal denticles runs along the midline of the back and tail; with the largest found at the base of the tail. The number of enlarged midline denticles increases with age. There is also a narrow band of minute granular or pointed denticles on the back, which are confined by a pair of parallel lines drawn backward from the spiracles. The upper surface of the disc and tail are plain brown, with the tail folds much darker. The underside is pale with large, irregular orange-yellow patches and a wide orange-red band around the disc margin. Bright orange ventral coloration also characterizes the red stingray (H. akajei) of the northwestern Pacific; the two species have some similar meristic counts, but differ in disc shape, denticles, and dorsal coloration. The maximum known disc width of the Mekong freshwater stingray is 62 cm (24 in); it can reportedly reach a weight of 30 kg (66 lb).

== Biology and ecology ==
The diet of the Mekong freshwater stingray consists of invertebrates from the river bed. Like other stingrays, it is aplacental viviparous with litter sizes possibly as small as one pup.

== Human interactions ==
The Mekong freshwater stingray is subject to intensive fishing aimed at large bony fishes. It is caught unintentionally, typically in seine nets or on hook-and-line, and sold fresh for human consumption; fishermen typically break off the tail spine before bringing it to market. However, a greater threat to the survival of this species is widespread habitat degradation within its limited range, from dam construction, agricultural runoff, and industrial pollution. Finally, the small juveniles may be collected for the aquarium trade. Because of these pressures, the International Union for Conservation of Nature (IUCN) has assessed this species as Endangered. The Thai government initiated a captive breeding program for this and other freshwater stingray species in the 1990s at Chai Nat, but the program has since been placed on hold.
