= Hemitrygon yemenensis =

Conservation status
- Data Deficient (IUCN 3.1)

Scientific classification
- Kingdom: Animalia
- Phylum: Chordata
- Class: Chondrichthyes
- Subclass: Elasmobranchii
- Order: Myliobatiformes
- Family: Dasyatidae
- Genus: Hemitrygon
- Species: H. yemenensis

Binomial name
- Hemitrygon yemenensis A. B. M. Moore, Last & Naylor, 2020

Species of stingray

Hemitrygon yemenensis, commonly known as Heins' stingray, is a species of stingray in the family Dasyatidae.

Hemitrygon yemenensis is found along the Arabian Sea coast of eastern Yemen. This species reaches a length of 22 cm (8.7 in).
