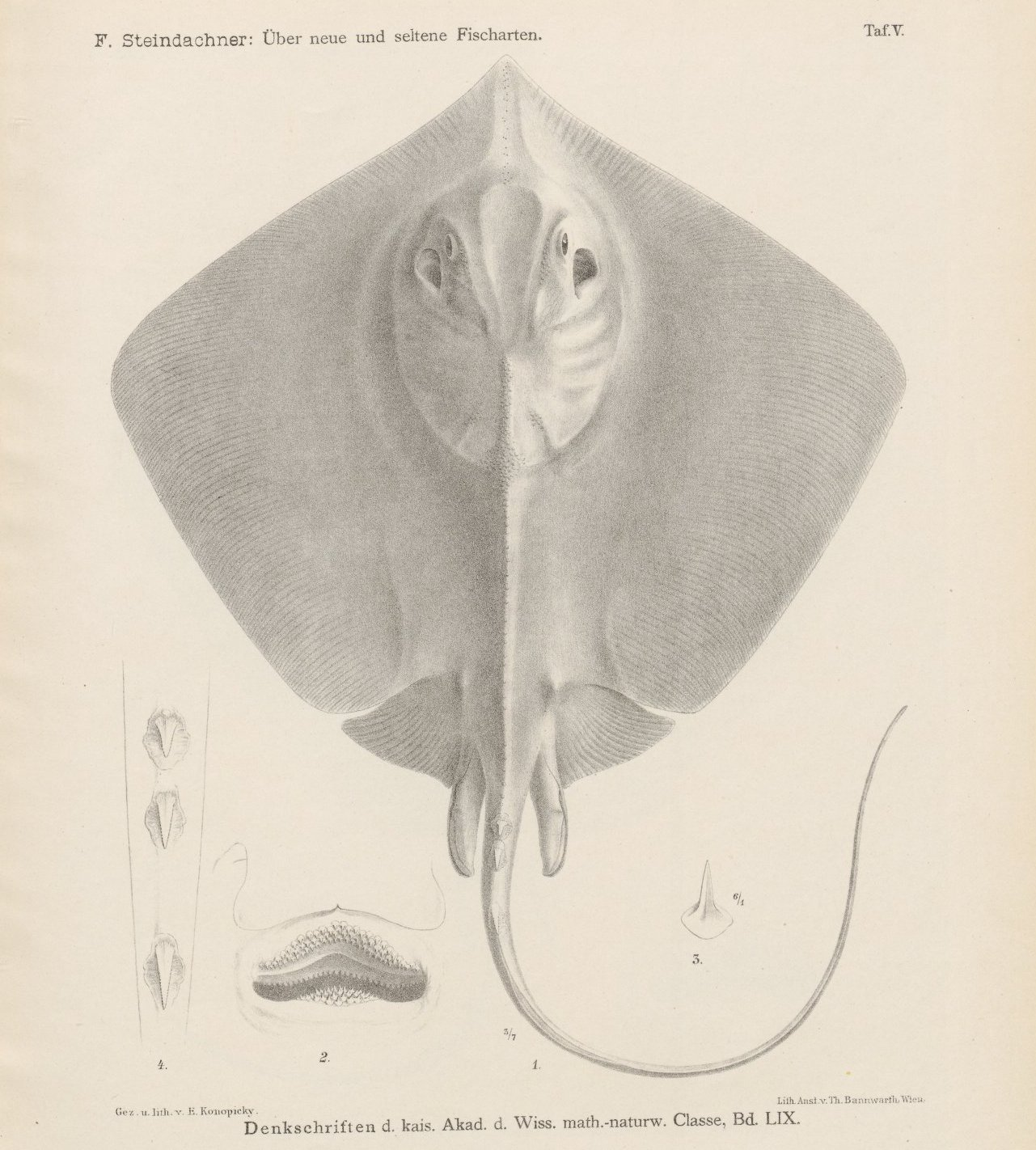

Conservation status
- Vulnerable (IUCN 3.1)

Scientific classification
- Kingdom: Animalia
- Phylum: Chordata
- Class: Chondrichthyes
- Subclass: Elasmobranchii
- Order: Myliobatiformes
- Family: Dasyatidae
- Genus: Hemitrygon
- Species: H. navarrae

Binomial name
- Hemitrygon navarrae (Steindachner, 1892)

Synonyms
- Dasyatis navarrae (Steindachner, 1892); Trygon navarrae Steindachner, 1892

= Blackish stingray =

Species of cartilaginous fish

The blackish stingray (Hemitrygon navarrae) is a little-known species of stingray in the family Dasyatidae, found in the northwestern Pacific Ocean off the coasts of mainland China and Taiwan. This species reaches 38 cm (15 in) across and has a chocolate brown, diamond-shaped pectoral fin disc nearly as long as wide. Its whip-like tail bears three large tubercles in front of the stinging spine, as well as both dorsal and ventral fin folds with the ventral fold half as long as the disc. Caught as bycatch in bottom trawls, the blackish stingray is frequently marketed as food in China.

== Taxonomy ==
Austrian zoologist Franz Steindachner originally described the blackish stingray as Trygon navarrae, in an 1892 volume of the scientific journal Denkschriften der Mathematisch-Naturwissenschaftlichen Classe der Kaiserlichen Akademie der Wissenschaften in Wien. The type specimen is a male 32 cm (13 in) across, collected from Shanghai, China.

== Distribution and habitat ==
The blackish stingray is found in the Yellow, Bohai, and East China Seas, to as far south as Taiwan. This bottom-dwelling species is found in coastal waters, and has been recorded from the estuary of the Yellow River.

== Description ==
The blackish stingray has a diamond-shaped pectoral fin disc almost as long as wide, with slightly sinuous leading margins, narrowly rounded outer corners, and almost straight trailing margins. The triangular, projecting snout comprises about one-fourth the disc length and bears 2–3 rows of enlarged pores along the midline. The eyes are small and closely followed by a pair of larger spiracles. The mouth is bow-shaped, with three papillae across the floor. There are 40 upper tooth rows and 37 lower tooth rows; the teeth of adult males are pointed while those of juveniles and females are blunt.

The tail is whip-like and bears a stinging spine on the dorsal surface, as well as both upper and lower fin folds; the ventral fold measures half the disc length. There are 4–6 rows of small tubercles between the eyes, a narrow strip of tubercles running down the center of back to the base of the tail, and three enlarged tubercles in front of the tail spine. The coloration is a plain dark brown above and whitish below. This species attains a disc width of 38 cm (15 in) and a total length of 60–94 cm (24–37 in)

== Biology and ecology ==
Little is known of the natural history of the blackish stingray. Known parasites of this species include the copepod Caligus dasyaticus and the monogenean Heterocotyle chinensis. It is presumably aplacental viviparous like other members of its family.

== Human interactions ==
Many blackish stingrays are captured incidentally by commercial bottom trawlers off the Chinese coast. It is one of the three most common stingray species sold for human consumption in China, though it is not highly valued. The blackish stingray is subject to intense fishing pressure within its range, and habitat degradation from coastal development may pose an additional threat. The International Union for Conservation of Nature (IUCN) has assessed this species as vulnerable.
