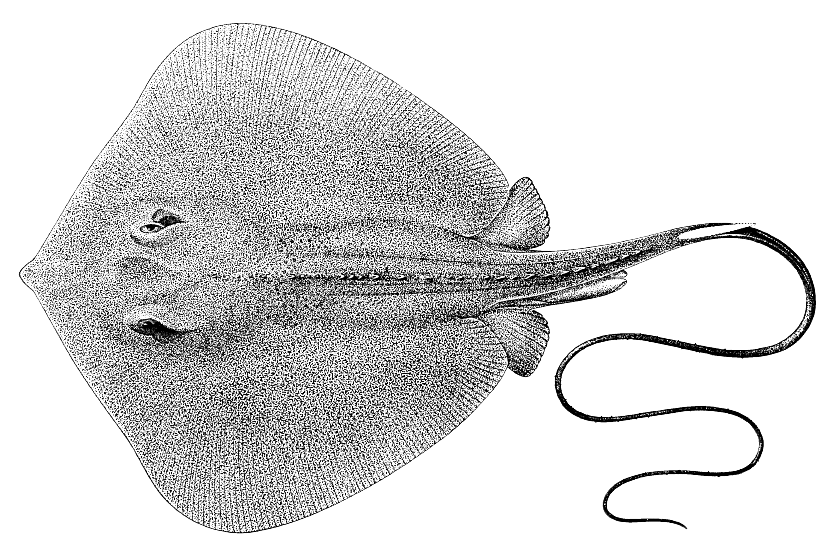

Conservation status
- Vulnerable (IUCN 3.1)

Scientific classification
- Kingdom: Animalia
- Phylum: Chordata
- Class: Chondrichthyes
- Subclass: Elasmobranchii
- Order: Myliobatiformes
- Family: Dasyatidae
- Genus: Hemitrygon
- Species: H. bennetti

Binomial name
- Hemitrygon bennetti (Müller & Henle, 1841)

Synonyms
- Trygon bennettii Müller & Henle, 1841

= Bennett's stingray =

Species of cartilaginous fish

The Bennett's stingray or frilltailed stingray (Hemitrygon bennetti, often misspelled benetti or bennettii) is a little-known species of stingray in the family Dasyatidae, with a wide but ill-defined distribution in the Indian and Pacific Oceans. This species is characterized by a rhomboid, yellow-brown pectoral fin disc with a fairly long snout, and an extremely long tail with a correspondingly long ventral fin fold. It measures up to 50 cm (20 in) across. It feeds on fish, and is aplacental viviparous. It is likely caught by demersal fisheries.

== Etymology ==
The fish is possibly named in honor of zoologist Edward Turner Bennett (1797-1836),

== Taxonomy ==
German biologists Johannes Peter Müller and Friedrich Gustav Jakob Henle described the Bennett's stingray as Trygon bennettii in their 1839–1841 Systematische Beschreibung der Plagiostomen. They referenced three specimens as the species syntypes: only the one from China remains, while another from Trinidad and a third of unknown provenance have been lost. Later authors synonymized the genus Trygon with Dasyatis.

== Distribution and habitat ==
The range of the Bennett's stingray is somewhat uncertain due to confusion with other species. It is a bottom-dweller that occurs in the coastal waters of the Indo-Pacific region, from India, through Indochina, to southern China, Japan, and perhaps the Philippines; it seems to be most common in the northwestern Pacific. This species has also been reported from Vanuatu and New Caledonia; the single historical record from Trinidad may be a misidentification. It has been known to enter fresh water, including the Perak River in peninsular Malaysia and the Indragiri River in Sumatra.

== Description ==
The Bennett's stingray has a diamond-shaped pectoral fin disc almost as wide as long, with straight leading margins converging on a triangular, moderately protruding snout. The trailing margins of the disc are convex. There are 31 upper and 33 lower tooth rows, and 3 or 5 papillae across the floor of the mouth. The tail is whip-like and can measure three times the length of the disc, proportionately longer than any other North Pacific Dasyatis species. There is a stinging spine on the upper surface of the tail, and a fin fold underneath measuring 60–67% the disc width. Young individuals have small dermal denticles in the middle of the back, whereas adults have a row of tubercles along the midline of the back and tiny thorns covering the tail. The coloration is yellowish brown above, becoming darker on the tail fold, and light below. This species attains a disc width of 50 cm (20 in) and a total length of 1.3 m (4.3 ft).

== Biology and ecology ==
There is little information on the natural history of the Bennett's stingray. It preys on fish, and is aplacental viviparous like other stingrays.

== Human interactions ==
The Bennett's stingray is susceptible to bottom trawl and net gear and probably caught by fisheries within its range, which include intensive, targeted ray fisheries off Thailand, Singapore, India, and elsewhere. The International Union for Conservation of Nature (IUCN) has listed this species as vulnerable.
