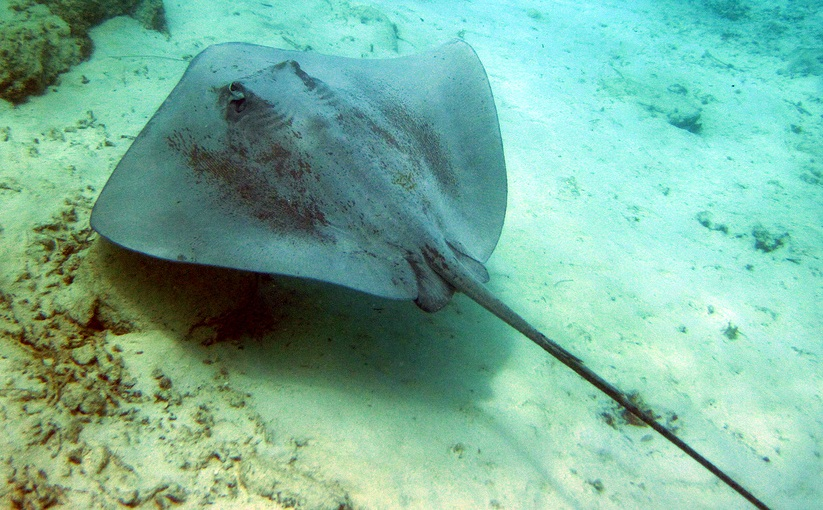
- P. fai

Scientific classification
- Kingdom: Animalia
- Phylum: Chordata
- Class: Chondrichthyes
- Subclass: Elasmobranchii
- Order: Myliobatiformes
- Family: Dasyatidae
- Subfamily: Urogymninae
- Genus: Pateobatis; Last, Naylor & Manjaji-Matsumoto, 2016

Type species
- Trygon uarnacoides Bleeker, 1852

= Pateobatis =

Genus of fishes

Pateobatis is a genus of stingrays in the family Dasyatidae from the Indo-Pacific. Its species were formerly contained within the genus Himantura.

== Species ==
- Pateobatis bleekeri (Blyth, 1860) (Bleeker's whipray)
- Pateobatis fai (Jordan & Seale, 1906) (Pink whipray)
- Pateobatis hortlei (Last, Manjaji-Matsumoto & Kailola, 2006) (Hortle's whipray)
- Pateobatis jenkinsii (Annandale, 1909) (Jenkins' whipray)
- Pateobatis uarnacoides (Bleeker, 1852) (Whitenose whipray)
