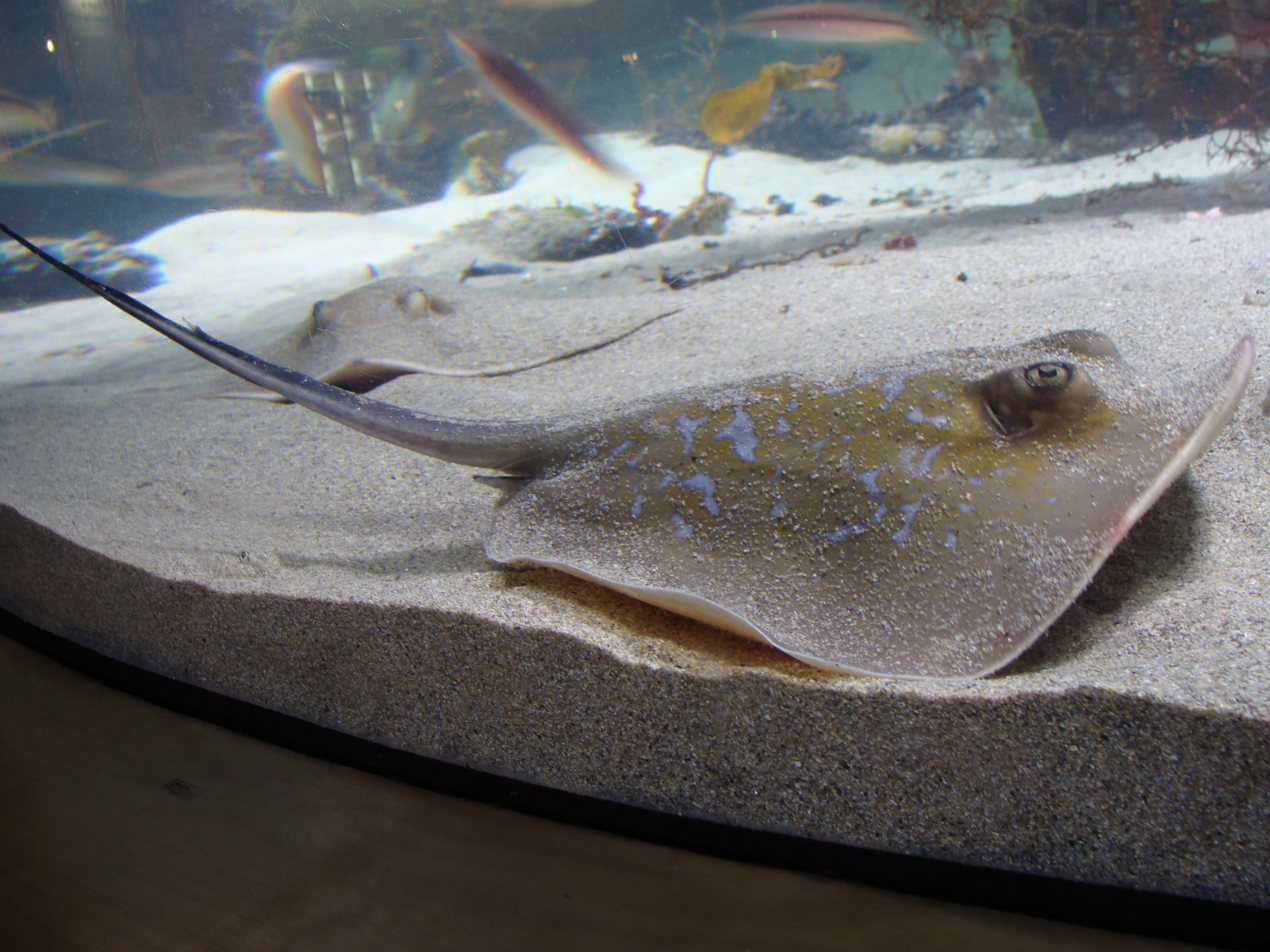

Conservation status
- Near Threatened (IUCN 3.1)

Scientific classification
- Kingdom: Animalia
- Phylum: Chordata
- Class: Chondrichthyes
- Subclass: Elasmobranchii
- Order: Myliobatiformes
- Family: Dasyatidae
- Genus: Dasyatis
- Species: D. marmorata

Binomial name
- Dasyatis marmorata (Steindachner, 1892)

Synonyms
- Dasyatis chrysonota subsp. marmorata (Steindachner, 1892); Trygon pastinaca subsp. marmorata Steindachner, 1892

= Dasyatis marmorata =

Species of stingray

Dasyatis marmorata, the marbled stingray, is a species of stingray of the family Dasyatidae. Its geographic range covers the central and south-eastern Atlantic, from Morocco to South Africa. It is also present in the coastal waters of southern Mediterranean Sea and the Levantine Basin. This bottom-dweller generally inhabits sandy or muddy flats near rocky reefs and kelp forests, to a depth of 50 m (160 ft).

== Description/Composition ==
A small to medium sized stingray with a snout and disc that doesn’t contain any spines. Their tails contain one dart at its base and the whole individual can measure up to 60 cm with a disk width of up to 44 cm. Their disc is more of an angular shape rather than a perfectly round sphere shape. One interesting fact that derives from their morphology, specifically their tail, is that Marbled Stingray has an undulatory locomotion swimming pattern.

They contain prominent elongated snouts, a rhomboidal disc without spines, and very conspicuous bright blue blotches on a beautiful golden background. These bright blue blotches seem to be warning signs that reflect he stingray's toxicity and harmful poison to the human health.

The marbled stingray has no caudal and anal fin, just a thick tail like a whip. In addition to this, they are considered bastoids with depressed bodies.

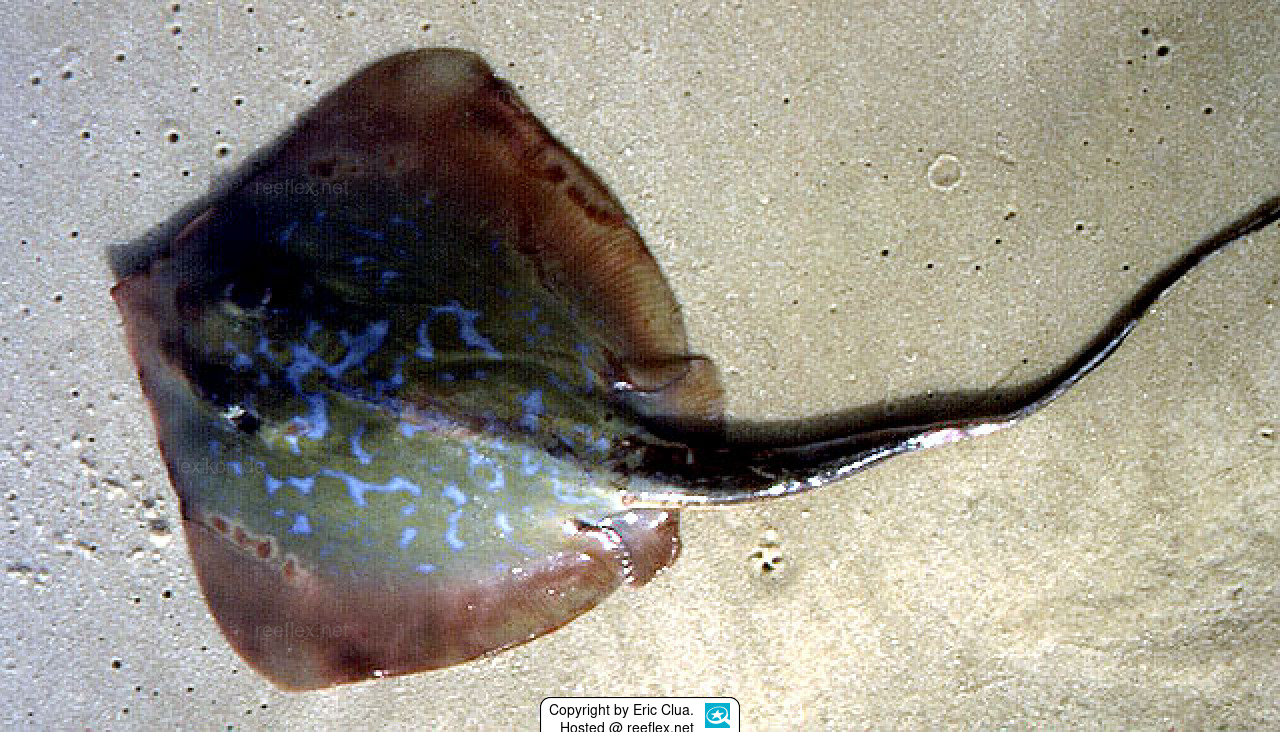
Marbled stingray's bright blue spots scattered on its dorsal front side

== Geographic Distribution ==
They have been recorded in the south of Tunisia, along the coast of Israel, Lebanon, Turkey and Greece. The species is, however, absent from the Black Sea. Additionally, there have been studies where the marbled stingray has been found in the Eastern Atlantic and Mediterranean Sea, off West Africa and the eastern North Atlantic from Morocco to south Congo

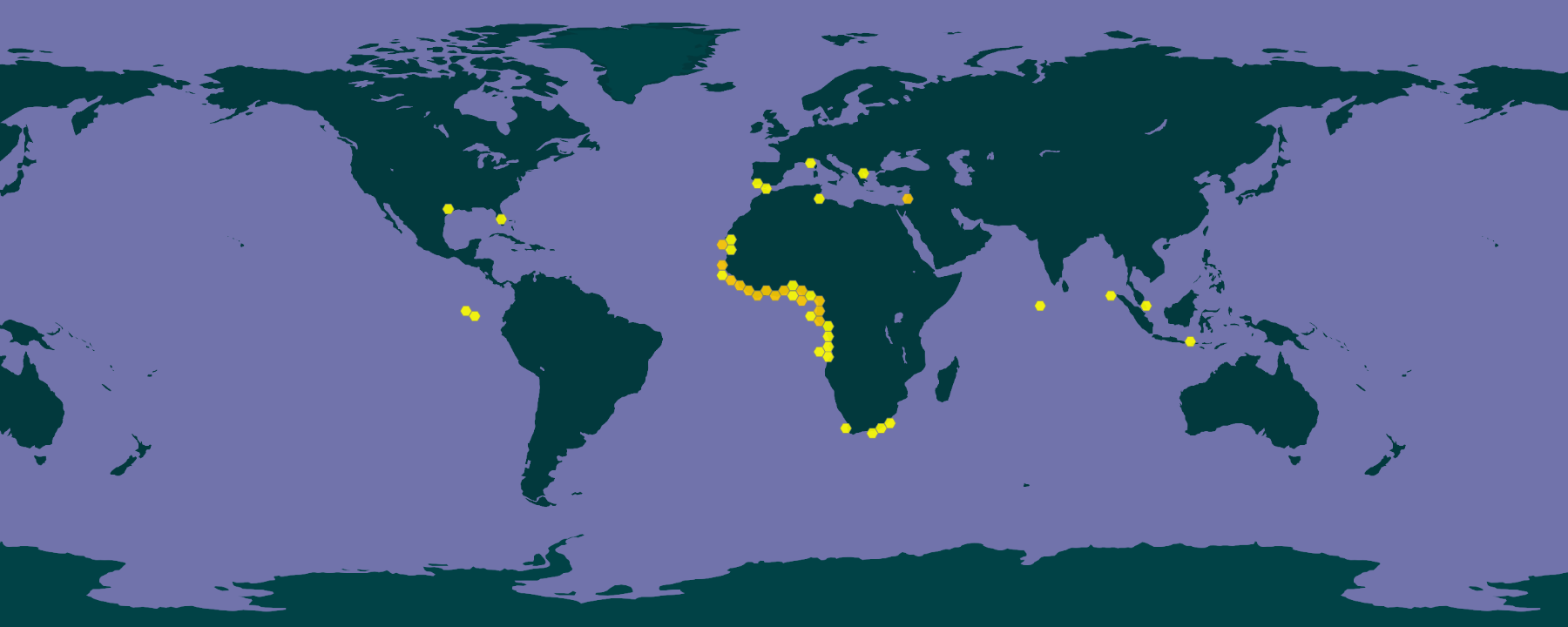
Geological distribution of the marbled stingray

Özbek did a close study in 2015 of the different Dasyatis species and the abundance and biomass of each one.

== Ecology ==
Their habitat is based on demersal species in temperate water, mainly inhabiting coastal and shallow water as they prefer warmer water temperatures. The Dasyatis marmorata is benthic on continental shelves that are found in sandy and muddy bottoms and/or sometimes even near rocky reefs They are found extremely deep from 12 to 100m under the ocean. The marbled stingray can be found in even deeper areas during winter.

== Diet ==
Previous research has revealed that Dasyatis marmota feeds on crabs, mantis, shrimps, amphipods, worms and fishes

== Life History/Biology ==
The Marbled Stingray had previously been misidentified as Dasyatis chrysonota in South Africa and as Dasyatis pastinaca in Europe, due to their similarities in disc length and width as well as the coloration on their pectoral fins. However, the main difference between D. marmota and D. pastinaca is that the marbled stingray has a yellowish surface with blue blotches, as opposed to the common stingray that exhibits brown to olive or grey coloration [4]. D.chrysonota and D. marmota also proved to differ in their snout angle as well as snout-to-vent length. Cowley and Compagno highlighted that the marbled stingray is a Northern hemisphere subspecies of Dasyatis chrysonota, that only has a slightly and more narrower angular snout. There have also been more newly found differences in the length and serrations of this structure proposed by Ergurden D.

In addition, the marbled stingray's sexual maturity is known to be reached at 30 cm (274 mm) and 32 cm in Disc Width (DW) for both males and females in that order [4] is viviparous with a gestation period of 3–4 months [4]. They usually have 4 juveniles per litter, each year.

Some research has attempted but not successfully advanced in finding the D. marmota's close relatives through, both old and new species.

Between Dasyatis marmorata, Rhinobatos cemiculus, and Rhinoptera marginata, it has been discovered that they contain about 50 different types across their muscle, liver, and gonadal tissues. Researchers showed that fatty acid composition differs significantly depending on both the species and the sex of the individual, which means that males, females, and different ray species each have their own kind of lipid patterns within themselves

== Conservation Status ==
The connection between humans and these blue-blotched stingrays is that they are often part of the bycatch that get caught by bottom-focused fisheries . So far, there has been no successful reports that this species has been kept in captivity successfully and it is known to only have been seen in the wild. Small-scale fisheries have been previously viewed as a good alternative to industrial fishing, however, they can still negatively affect the bycatch fish that roams the deep waters, one of them being the marbled stingray.
