= Zanobatus maculatus =

Conservation status
- Near Threatened (IUCN 3.1)

Scientific classification
- Kingdom: Animalia
- Phylum: Chordata
- Class: Chondrichthyes
- Subclass: Elasmobranchii
- Order: Myliobatiformes
- Family: Zanobatidae
- Genus: Zanobatus
- Species: Z. maculatus

Binomial name
- Zanobatus maculatus Séret, 2016

Zanobatus maculatus, the maculate panray, is a type of panray of the family Zanobatidae found in the Gulf of Guinea, eastern central Atlantic ocean. It inhabits shallow coastal region up to 30 meters deep and currently threatened by local fisheries which often take it as bycatch.

== Description ==
The maculate panray can be differentiated from its congener, the striped panray, due to numerous characteristics, including brownish-reddish brown dorsal surface, pale creamy white or orange-brown ventral surface, and spearhead-shaped dermal denticles crown on its dorsal surface. It can reach a maximum total length (TL) of 36 cm.

== Habitat and distribution ==
This species is usually found on shallow sandy and muddy substrates at the depths of 1 - 30 m (3.3 - 98.4 feet). Its endemic habitat is the Gulf of Guinea, stretching from Ivory Coast to Gabon.

The maculate panray is often accidentally caught by both artisanal and industrial fisheries. Given the smaller size of this species, it will likely be discarded instead of retained for human consumption.
