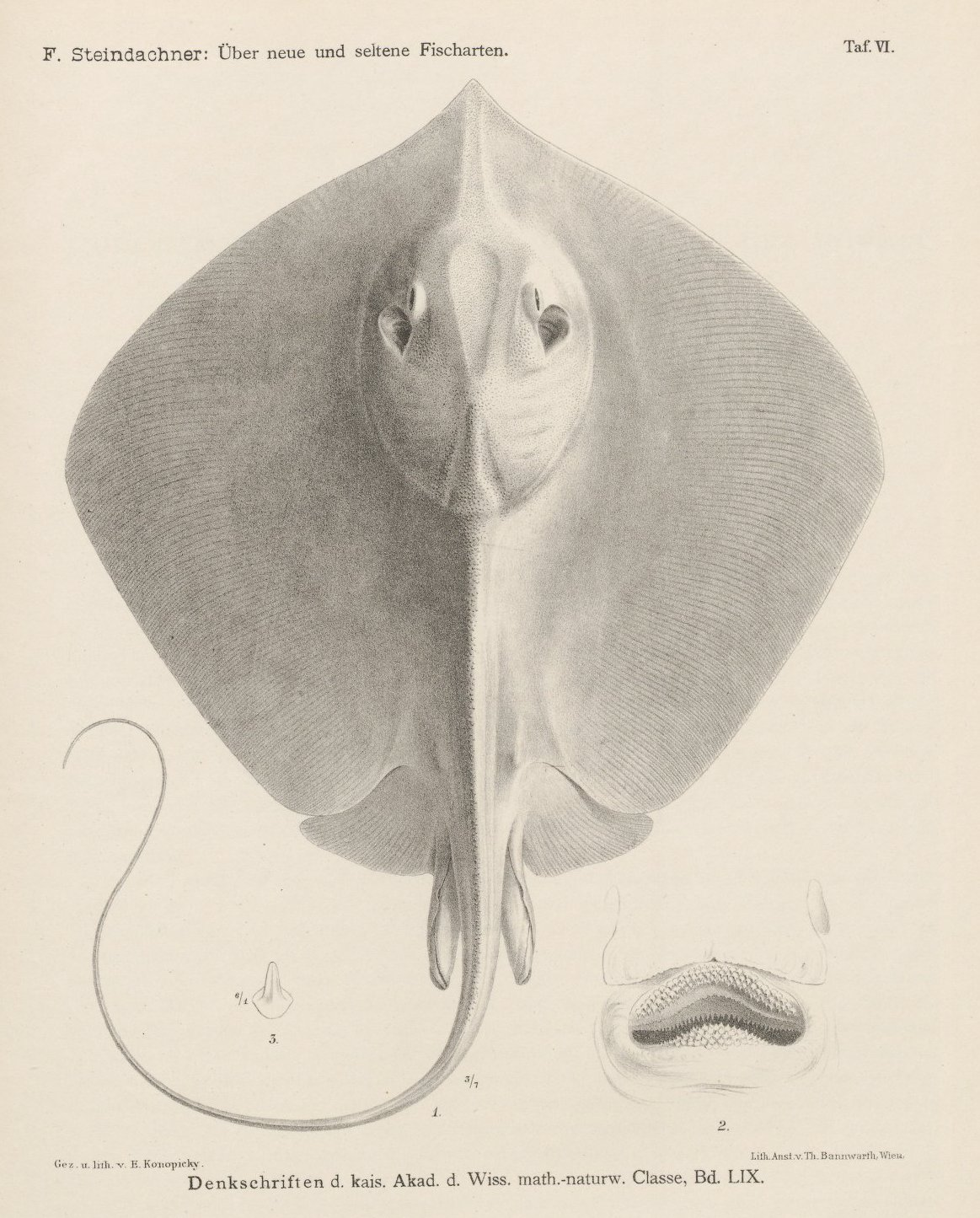

Conservation status
- Endangered (IUCN 3.1)

Scientific classification
- Kingdom: Animalia
- Phylum: Chordata
- Class: Chondrichthyes
- Subclass: Elasmobranchii
- Order: Myliobatiformes
- Family: Dasyatidae
- Genus: Hemitrygon
- Species: H. sinensis

Binomial name
- Hemitrygon sinensis (Steindachner, 1892)

Synonyms
- Trygon sinensis Steindachner, 1892

= Chinese stingray =

Species of cartilaginous fish

The Chinese stingray (Hemitrygon sinensis) is a little-known species of stingray in the family Dasyatidae, found in the northwestern Pacific Ocean off the coasts of China and Korea. This species is characterized by a band of small dermal denticles running along the upper surface of its diamond-shaped pectoral fin disc, from the snout to the tail spine. It can grow to 40 cm (16 in) across and 82 cm (32 in) long. The Chinese stingray is taken incidentally in bottom trawls and is one of the three most commonly marketed stingrays in China. At present, the International Union for Conservation of Nature (IUCN) has assessed its conservation status as endangered.

== Taxonomy ==
The Chinese stingray was originally described as Trygon sinensis by Austrian Franz Steindachner, in an 1892 volume of the scientific journal Denkschriften der Mathematisch-Naturwissenschaftlichen Classe der Kaiserlichen Akademie der Wissenschaften in Wien. The type specimen is a male 38 cm (15 in) across, collected from Shanghai, China.

== Distribution and habitat ==
The Chinese stingray has been recorded along the coasts of China and Korea in the Yellow, Bohai, and East China Seas. Found on or near the bottom, this species apparently inhabits cold, inshore waters less than 200 m (660 ft) deep.

== Description ==
The pectoral fin disc of the Chinese stingray is diamond-shaped and almost as long as wide, with slightly convex leading and trailing margins. The snout is triangular and projecting, comprising a quarter of the disc length. The eyes are of moderate size and closely followed by a pair of spiracles. The mouth is bow-shaped and contains five papillae on the floor, consisting of an anterior row of three and a posterior row of two. The tooth rows number 37 in the upper jaw and 40 in the lower jaw; the teeth of adult males are pointed, while those of juveniles and females are blunt.

The whip-like tail measures not quite twice the length of the disc and bears both dorsal and ventral fin folds behind a stinging tail spine; the ventral fold measures less than half as long as the disc. Some individuals lack a tail spine. The dorsal surface is roughened by a band of small dermal denticles, extending from the snout to the base of the tail. This species is gray above, lightening to yellowish towards the fin margins, and lighter below. The Chinese stingray attains a disc width of 40 cm (16 in), and a total length of 82 cm (32 in) for males and 73 cm (29 in) for females.

== Biology and ecology ==
Little is known of the Chinese stingray's natural history. It is presumably aplacental viviparous like other members of its family.

== Human interactions ==
The Chinese stingray is often caught incidentally in bottom trawls along the Chinese coast and marketed for human consumption, though it is of low value. It is one of the three most common stingray species sold in China. This species is subject to intense fishing pressure within its range, but specific utilization or population data is lacking, exacerbated by the difficulty of accurately identifying stingray species. The International Union for Conservation of Nature (IUCN) has listed the Chinese stingray as endangered.
