= Makararaja =

Conservation status
- Data Deficient (IUCN 3.1)

Scientific classification
- Kingdom: Animalia
- Phylum: Chordata
- Class: Chondrichthyes
- Subclass: Elasmobranchii
- Order: Myliobatiformes
- Family: Dasyatidae
- Genus: Makararaja; T. R. Roberts, 2007
- Species: M. chindwinensis

Binomial name
- Makararaja chindwinensis T. R. Roberts, 2007

Species of ray

Makararaja chindwinensis is a freshwater stingray found in the Chindwin River, a tributary of the Irrawaddy, in Myanmar. It is the sole member of its genus.
