= Pastinachus stellurostris =

Conservation status
- Critically Endangered (IUCN 3.1)

Scientific classification
- Kingdom: Animalia
- Phylum: Chordata
- Class: Chondrichthyes
- Subclass: Elasmobranchii
- Order: Myliobatiformes
- Family: Dasyatidae
- Genus: Pastinachus
- Species: P. stellurostris

Binomial name
- Pastinachus stellurostris Last, Fahmi, & Naylor, 2010

Species of stingray

Pastinachus stellurostris, the starrynose cowtail ray, is a type of tropical ray of the family Dasyatidae found mainly in Indonesia, specifically the estuary of Kapuas River in West Kalimantan. It is believed to inhabit both freshwater and brackish water. This species is threatened by local fisheries due to being captured either deliberately or accidentally.

== Description ==
Not much is known about the biology, but investigations have been undergone and suggest that the starrynose cowtail ray can reach a maximum size of approximately 43 cm disc width. The name "stellurostris", composed of the words "stella"/"starry" and "rostrum"/"snout", refers to the main characteristic of this species: star-shaped denticles on the snout.

== Habitat & distribution ==
The starrynose cowtail ray is originally known from West Kalimantan, Indonesia, albeit more recent studies indicate its existence in the Gulf of Thailand. This demersal ray lives in shallow, fresh or brackish waters of an unknown depth. It is often caught as target or bycatch by small-scale local fisheries.
