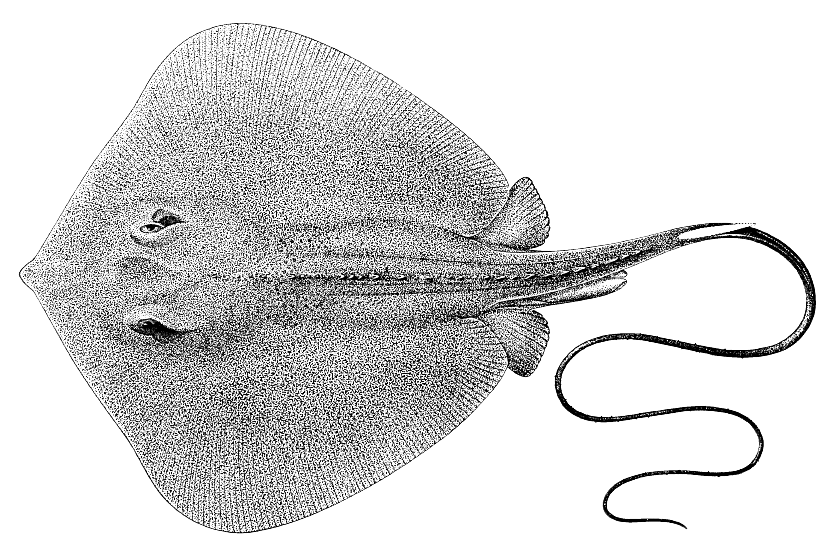
- H. bennettii

Scientific classification
- Kingdom: Animalia
- Phylum: Chordata
- Class: Chondrichthyes
- Subclass: Elasmobranchii
- Order: Myliobatiformes
- Family: Dasyatidae
- Subfamily: Dasyatinae
- Genus: Hemitrygon; Müller & Henle, 1838

Type species
- Trygon bennettii Müller & Henle, 1841

Synonyms
- Toshia Whitley, 1933; Urolophoides Lindberg, 1930

= Hemitrygon =

Genus of cartilaginous fishes

Hemitrygon is a genus of stingrays in the family Dasyatidae from marine, brackish and freshwater habitats in the central Indo-Pacific and northwest Pacific regions. The genus was formerly regarded as a junior synonym of the genus Dasyatis.

== Species ==
The taxonomy of Hemitrygon requires revision, as some existing species may be synonyms and there may be undescribed species. H. yemenensis was described in 2020 from materials collected nearly 120 years ago and its status in the wild is unknown.

- Hemitrygon akajei (Müller & Henle, 1841) (Red stingray)
- Hemitrygon ariakensis (Furumitsu & Yamaguchi, 2025) (Ariake stingray)
- Hemitrygon bennetti (Müller & Henle, 1841) (Bennett's stingray)
- Hemitrygon fluviorum (Ogilby, 1908) (Estuary stingray)
- Hemitrygon izuensis (Nishida & Nakaya, 1988) (Izu stingray)
- Hemitrygon laevigata (Chu, 1960) (Yantai stingray)
- Hemitrygon laosensis (Roberts & Karnasuta, 1987) (Mekong freshwater stingray)
- Hemitrygon longicauda (Last & W. T. White, 2013) (Merauke stingray)
- Hemitrygon navarrae (Steindachner, 1892) (Blackish stingray)
- Hemitrygon parvonigra (Last & White, 2008) (Dwarf black stingray)
- Hemitrygon sinensis (Steindachner, 1892) (Chinese stingray)
- Hemitrygon yemenensis A. B. M. Moore, Last & Naylor, 2020
