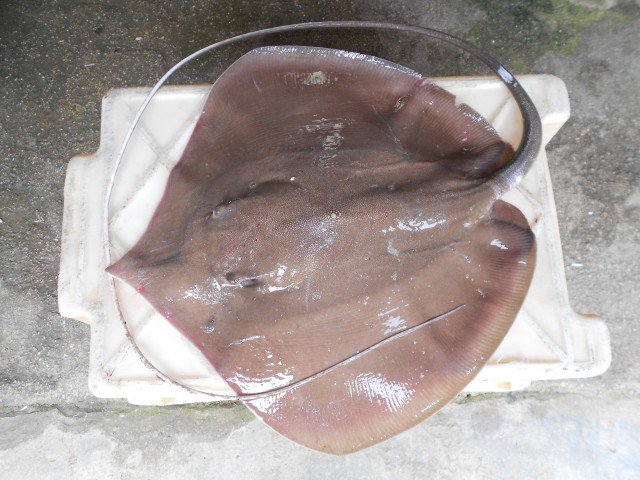

Conservation status
- Endangered (IUCN 3.1)

Scientific classification
- Kingdom: Animalia
- Phylum: Chordata
- Class: Chondrichthyes
- Subclass: Elasmobranchii
- Order: Myliobatiformes
- Family: Dasyatidae
- Genus: Pateobatis
- Species: P. uarnacoides

Binomial name
- Pateobatis uarnacoides (Bleeker, 1852)

Synonyms
- Trygon uarnacoides Bleeker, 1852; Himantura uarnacoides (Bleeker, 1852)

= Whitenose whipray =

Species of cartilaginous fish

The whitenose whipray (Pateobatis uarnacoides) is a species of stingray in the family Dasyatidae native to the eastern Indian Ocean and the western central Pacific Ocean, where it is found in shallow water including estuaries.

This species was first described by the Dutch ichthyologist Pieter Bleeker in 1852. He was an army surgeon who worked for 20 years for the Dutch East India Company in Indonesia, amassing a collection of over 12,000 fish which he took home with him when he returned to Holland. They are mostly lodged in the Natural History Museum in Leiden.

== Distribution and habitat ==
The whitenose whipray is found in the eastern Indian Ocean and the western central Pacific Ocean, its range extending from India to Malaysia and Indonesia; it is a demersal fish and is usually found over soft substrates in water that is shallower than 30 m (100 ft), including the lower reaches of rivers and estuaries. One individual was found in a saltwater lagoon.

== Uses ==
The species is caught in large quantities by bottom trawling, demersal tangle netting, trammel netting, and Danish seine fishing in India, Malaysia, and Indonesia. The flesh is consumed fresh or preserved by salting and drying, and the cartilage (vertebrae) is dried and exported to the Far East. The skins are dried and used in the manufacture of galuchat bags, wallets, belts, and shoes.

== Status ==
This demersal whipray is threatened by overexploitation, as it is fished intensively over much of its range. In Indonesia, fishing vessels must travel for much greater distances to find acceptable quantities of fish. In India, too, where it is heavily fished, the catch rate is also declining from overfishing, as well as pollution and coastal degradation. The International Union for Conservation of Nature has assessed this fish as "endangered".
