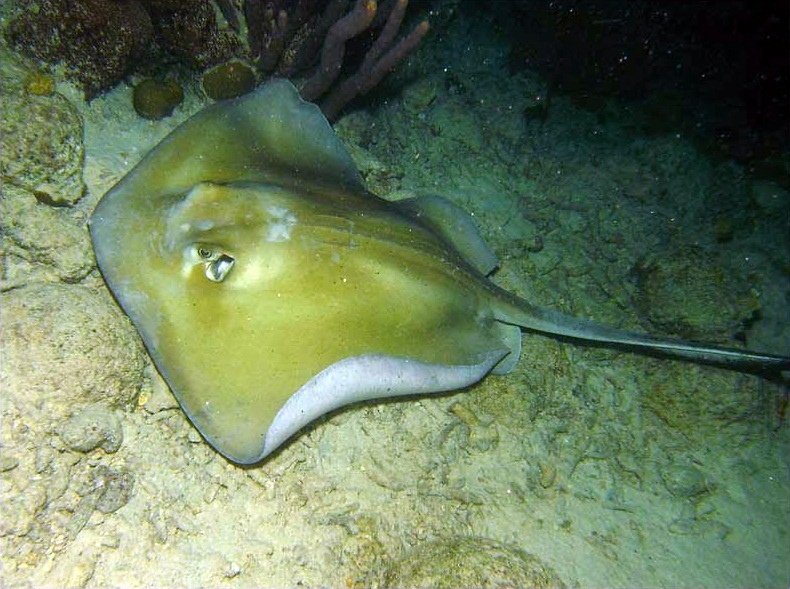
- Southern stingray (Dasyatis americana)

Scientific classification
- Kingdom: Animalia
- Phylum: Chordata
- Class: Chondrichthyes
- Subclass: Elasmobranchii
- Division: Batomorphi
- Order: Myliobatiformes
- Family: Dasyatidae; D. S. Jordan, 1888

= Whiptail stingray =

Whiptail stingrays Temporal range: Hauterivian–Recent

Family of fishes

The whiptail stingrays are a family, the Dasyatidae, of rays in the order Myliobatiformes. They are found worldwide in tropical to temperate marine waters, and a number of species have also penetrated into fresh water in Africa, Asia, and Australia. Members of this family have flattened pectoral fin discs that range from oval to diamond-like in shape. Their common name comes from their whip-like tails, which are much longer than the disc and lack dorsal and caudal fins. All whiptail stingrays, except the porcupine ray (Urogymnus asperrimus), have one or more venomous stings near the base of the tail, which is used in defense. In order to sting their victims, they jerk their tails as the stinger falls off and stays in the wound that they have created. The stinger of a whiptail stingray is pointy, sharp with jagged edges. During mating season, males often hold onto females by using teeth which curve towards the corners of their mouths. They range in size from 0.18 to 2.0 m (0.59 to 6.56 ft) or more across in the case of the smalleye stingray and giant freshwater stingray. Species, being highly electroreceptive, can detect weak electric fields from prey. Electroreception is a product of electroreceptors dispersed across the skin. This network of pores is part of organs known as the ampullae of Lorenzini.

== Genera ==
The taxonomy of Dasyatidae was revised by Peter Last, Gavin Naylor, and Mabel Manjaji-Matsumoto in 2016, based on morphological and molecular phylogenetic data. The placement of Megatrygon within the family is provisional pending further research, as evidence suggests it may be more closely related to the families Potamotrygonidae and Urotrygonidae than to other dasyatids.

- Subfamily Dasyatinae D. S. Jordan & Gilbert, 1879
  - Bathytoshia Whitley, 1933
  - Dasyatis Rafinesque, 1810
  - Hemitrygon Müller & Henle, 1838
  - Hypanus Rafinesque, 1818
  - Megatrygon Last, Naylor, and Manjaji-Matsumoto, 2016
  - Pteroplatytrygon Fowler, 1910
  - Telatrygon Last, Naylor, and Manjaji-Matsumoto, 2016
  - Taeniurops Garman, 1913
- Subfamily Hypolophinae Stromer, 1910
  - Makararaja T. R. Roberts, 2007
  - Pastinachus Rüppell, 1829
- Subfamily Neotrygoninae Castelnau, 1873
  - Neotrygon Castelnau, 1873
  - Taeniura J. P. Müller and Henle, 1837
- Subfamily Urogymninae Gray, 1851
  - Brevitrygon Last, Naylor, and Manjaji-Matsumoto, 2016
  - Fluvitrygon Last, Naylor, and Manjaji-Matsumoto, 2016
  - Fontitrygon Last, Naylor, and Manjaji-Matsumoto, 2016
  - Himantura J. P. Müller and Henle, 1837
  - Maculabatis Last, Naylor, and Manjaji-Matsumoto, 2016
  - Pateobatis Last, Naylor, and Manjaji-Matsumoto, 2016
  - †Protohimantura Marramà, Klug, de Vos & Kriwet, 2018
  - Urogymnus J. P. Müller and Henle, 1837

== Habitat ==
Whiptail rays are commonly found in shallow tropical water, but they may also be found in temperate regions. Having flat bodies, they are demersal, meaning they live at the bottom of a body of water. These rays specifically live sometimes buried in sand or mud or even near coral reefs on continental shelves, or the shelf created when part of a continent is under water. Whiptail rays typically inhabit shallow coastlines of 100 to 200 meters down, but some go as far as 600 meters. To avoid being preyed upon, these rays usually stay buried with just their eyes protruding. These rays are preyed on by multiple shark species, specifically hammerhead sharks.

Some species of whiptail rays live in mangrove swamps, while others reside in the open ocean. Not all species of Whiptail rays live in salt water, however. The subfamily Potamotrygoninae lives solely in freshwater, often buried in sand or mud in backwaters or shallow rivers. This specific species only resides in West Africa and the Atlantic drainages of South America.

== Diet ==
The diet of Whiptail rays generally includes mollusks, crustaceans, jellyfish, and bony fish. They extract food by digging in the sand. In areas such as Stingray City in Grand Cayman and Hamelyn Bay in Western Australia, some rays accept scraps from tourists. Rays may also gather at fisherman's fish cleaning stations. Their electroreceptive abilities allow the rays to detect weak electric fields from prey. This ability allows rays to identify the relative area of prey from a distance.

== Human use ==
Species' flesh may be used for human consumption in areas like South-West Asia where it's salted and dried. Skin may also be used for leather products like wallets and shoes. Species may be found in aquarium exhibits or used for ecotourism.

== Conservation ==
Many whiptail ray species face decreasing populations, with a large number marked from threatened to endangered. The Smalltooth Stingray, Starrynose Cowtail Ray, Pakistan Whipray, Shorttail Whipray, Smooth Stingray, Colares Stingray, Wingfin Stingray, and Thorny Whipray are marked as critically endangered. Threats to stingrays include bycatch as product of overfishing, water contamination, loss of habitat, tourism, and climate change causing increased water temperatures. Note that some of these species listed below may be repeats under alternative names.

Name	Scientific Name	Population Trend	Red List Assessment	Last Assessed
Bluntnose Stingray	Hypanus say	Decreasing	Near Threatened	21 June 2019
Blue Stingray	Dasyatis chrysonota	Decreasing	Near Threatened	01 August 2019
Porcupine Ray	Urogymnus asperrimus	Decreasing	Endangered	16 June 2023
Brown Whipray	Maculabatis toshi	Unknown	Least Concern	12 May 2015
Roughtail Stingray	Bathytoshia centroura	Decreasing	Vulnerable	21 June 2019
Diamond Stingray	Hypanus dipterurus	Decreasing	Vulnerable	08 February 2019
Groovebelly Stingray	Dasyatis hypostigma	Decreasing	Endangered	01 July 2019
Common Stingray	Dasyatis pastinaca	Decreasing	Vulnerable	04 August 2020
Leopard Whipray	Himantura leoparda	Decreasing	Endangered	24 March 2023
Giant Freshwater Whipray	Urogymnus polylepis	Decreasing	Endangered	25 January 2021
White-edge Whipray	Fluvitrygon signifer	Decreasing	Endangered	25 January 2021
Bengal Whipray	Brevitrygon imbricata	Decreasing	Vulnerable	30 April 2020
Coach Whipray	Himantura uarnak	Decreasing	Endangered	27 November 2020
Bennett's Stingray	Hemitrygon bennetti	Decreasing	Vulnerable	28 August 2019
Painted Maskray	Neotrygon leylandi	Stable	Least Concern	28 November 2024
Pearl Whipray	Fontitrygon margaritella	Decreasing	Near Threatened	04 August 2020
Roughback Whipray	Fluvitrygon kittipongi	Decreasing	Endangered	22 January 2021
Longtail Stingray	Hypanus longus	Decreasing	Vulnerable	08 February 2019
Atlantic Stingray	Hypanus sabinus	Decreasing	Least Concern	21 June 2019
Yantai Stingray	Hemitrygon laevigata	Decreasing	Vulnerable	29 August 2019
Javan Whipray	Brevitrygon javaensis	Decreasing Stingray	Endangered	06 May 2020
Mahogany Maskray	Neotrygon varidens	Stable	Least Concern	20 May 2020
Sandwich-tail Whipray	Brevitrygon manjajiae	Decreasing	Near Threatened	15 January 2024
Baraka's Whipray	Maculabatis ambigua	Decreasing	Near Threatened	24 April 2018
Whitespotted Whipray	Maculabatis gerrardi	Decreasing	Endangered	06 May 2020
Speckled Maskray	Neotrygon picta	Unknown	Least Concern	24 August 2015
Smalleye Stingray	Megatrygon microps	Unknown	Data Deficent	30 March 2023
Chinese Stingray	Hemitrygon sinensis	Decreasing	Endangered	29 August 2019
Tortonese's Stingray	Dasyatis tortonesei	Unknown	Data Deficent	04 August 2020
Marbled Stingray	Dasyatis marmorata	Decreasing	Near Threatened	04 August 2020
Coral Sea Maskray	Neotrygon trigonoides	Stable	Least Concern	19 October 2020
Indonesian Sharpnose Ray	Telatrygon biasa	Decreasing	Vulnerable	20 May 2020
Mumburarr Whipray	Urogymnus acanthobothrium	Unknown	Data Deficient	22 April 2021
Hortle's Whipray	Pateobatis hortlei	Decreasing	Near Threatened	02 February 2021
Daisy Whipray	Fontitrygon margarita	Decreasing	Vulnerable	04 August 2020
Merauke Stingray	Hemitrygon longicauda	Decreasing	Near Threatened	21 September 2020
Dwarf Whipray	Brevitrygon heterura	Decreasing	Vulnerable	12 May 2020
Bleeker's Whipray	Pateobatis bleekeri	Decreasing	Endangered	29 April 2020
Bluespotted Maskray	Neotrygon caeruleopunctata	Stable	Least Concern	30 September 2020
Smalltooth Stingray	Hypanus rudis	Decreasing	Critically Endangered	04 August 2020
Pink Whipray	Pateobatis fai	Decreasing	Vulnerable	24 July 2023
Ningaloo Whipray	Neotrygon ningalooensis	Stable	Least Concern	28 November 2024
Heins' Stingray	Hemitrygon yemenensis	Unknown	Data Deficient	23 September 2020
Starrynose Cowtail Ray	Pastinachus stellurostris	Decreasing	Critically Endangered	19 May 2020
Arabian Banded Whipray	Maculabatis randalli	Stable	Least Concern	08 February 2017
Plain Maskray	Neotrygon annotata	Decreasing	Near Threatened	24 August 2024
Tubemouth Whipray	Urogymnus lobistoma	Decreasing	Endangered	20 May 2020
Whitenose Whipray	Pateobatis uarnacoides	Decreasing	Endangered	13 May 2020
Brown Stingray	Bathytoshia lata	Decreasing	Vulnerable	04 August 2020
Australian Bluespotted Maskray	Neotrygon australiae	Decreasing	Near Threatened	15 November 2020
Sharpnose Whipray	Maculabatis macrura	Decreasing	Endangered	06 May 2020
Pakistan Whipray	Maculabatis arabica	Decreasing	Critically Endangered	08 February 2017
Shorttail Whipray	Maculabatis bineeshi	Decreasing	Critically Endangered	21 May 2020
Oriental Bluespotted Maskray	Neotrygon orientalis	Stable	Least Concern	20 May 2020
Chindwin Cowtail Ray	Makararaja chindwinensis	Unknown	Data Deficient	25 January 2021
Japanese Bluespotted Maskray	Neotrygon yakkoei	Decreasing	Near Threatened	27 August 2024
Smooth Stingray	Bathytoshia brevicaudata	Stable	Least Concern	27 November 2020
Blackfish Stingray	Hemitrygon navarrae	Decreasing	Vulnerable	29 April 2020
Dwarf Black Stingray	Hemitrygon parvonigra	Decreasing	Vulnerable	06 October 2024
Mekong Stingray	Hemitrygon laosensis	Decreasing	Endangered	25 January 2021
Scaly Whipray	Brevitrygon walga	Decreasing	Near Threatened	09 February 2017
Izu Stingray	Hemitrygon izuensis	Decreasing	Vulnerable	27 August 2019
Freshwater Whipray	Urogymnus dalyensis	Stable	Least Concern	21 December 2024
Indian Sharpnose Ray	Telatrygon crozieri	Decreasing	Endangered	12 May 2020
Red Stingray	Hemitrygon akajei	Decreasing	Near Threatened	27 August 2019
Narrow Cowtail Ray	Pastinachus gracilicaudus	Decreasing	Endangered	19 May 2020
Australian Whipray	Himantura australis	Stable	Least Concern	09 February 2021
Bluespotted Lagoon Ray	Taeniura lymma	Increasing	Least Concern	01 September 2020
Kuhl's Maskray	Neotrygon kuhlii	Unknown	Data Deficient	22 June 2017
Estuary Stingray	Hemitrygon fluviorum	Decreasing	Vulnerable	17 April 2024
Lutz's Stingray	Hypanus berthalutzae	Decreasing	Vulnerable	08 August 2020
Sharpnose Ray	Telatrygon acutirostra	Decreasing	Vulnerable	27 August 2019
Round Whipray	Maculabatis pastinacoides	Decreasing	Endangered	20 May 2020
Pale-edge Sharpnose Ray	Telatrygon zugei	Decreasing	Vulnerable	28 August 2019
Cowtail Ray	Pastinachus sephen	Decreasing	Near Threatened	07 February 2017
Southern Stingray	Hypanus americanus	Decreasing	Near Threatened	21 June 2019
Smooth Stingray	Fontitrygon garouaensis	Decreasing	Critically Endangered	04 August 2020
Roughnose Cowtail Ray	Pastinachus solocirostris	Decreasing	Endangered	27 May 2020
Oceania Fantail Ray	Taeniura lessoni	Unknown	Data Deficient	22 June 2017
Colares Stingray	Fontitrygon colarensis	Decreasing	Critically Endangered	01 July 2019
Pelagic Stingray	Pteroplatytrygon violacea	Unknown	Least Concern	09 November 2018
Blotched Fantail Ray	Taeniurops meyeni	Decreasing	Vulnerable	24 July 2023
Large-eye Stingray	Hypanus marianae	Decreasing	Endangered	01 July 2019
Jenkin's Whipray	Pateobatis jenkinsii	Decreasing	Endangered	24 July 2023
Wingfin Stingray	Fontitrygon geijskesi	Decreasing	Critically Endangered	01 July 2019
Longnose Stingray	Hypanus guttatus	Decreasing	Near Threatened	21 June 2019
Thorny Whipray	Fontitrygon ukpam	Decreasing	Critically Endangered	04 August 2020
Round Stingray	Taeniurops grabatus	Decreasing	Near Threatened	04 August 2020
Blackspotted Whipray	Maculabatis astra	Decreasing	Near Threatened	10 March 2024
Marbled Whipray	Fluvitrygon oxyrhynchus	Decreasing	Endangered	22 January 2021
Mangrove Whipray	Urogymnus granulatus	Decreasing	Endangered	24 July 2023
Honeycomb Whipray	Himantura undulata	Decreasing	Endangered	06 May 2020
Broad Cowtail Ray	Pastinachus ater	Decreasing	Vulnerable	19 May 2020

== Phylogeny ==
- Dasyatidae
  - Pastinachinae
    Pastinachus
  - - Urogymninae
      - Fontitrygon
      - - Urogymnus
        - - - Brevitrygon
            - Fluvitrygon
          - - Pateobatis
            - - Maculabatis
              - Himantura
    - - Neotrygoninae
        - Neotrygon
        - Taeniura
      - Dasyatinae
        - Hypanus
        - - - Dasyatis
            - Taeniurops
          - - - Bathytoshia
              - Pteroplatytrygon
            - - Hemitrygon
              - Telatrygon

Phylogenetic relationships of dasyatid genera, based on mitochondrial DNA (Makararaja not included; Megatrygon does not cluster within the family).

== See also ==
- List of fish families
