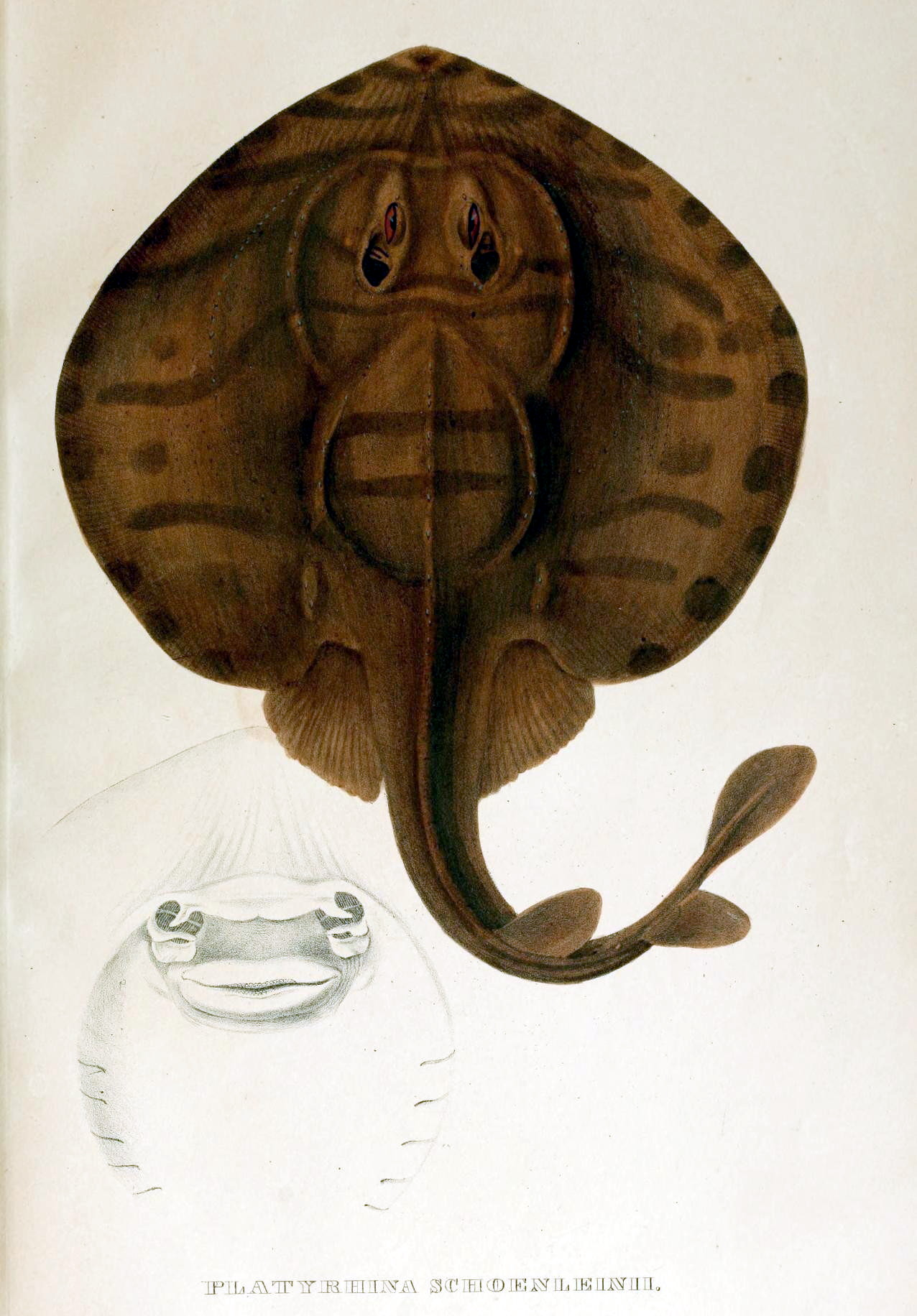
- Striped panray, Zanobatus schoenleinii

Scientific classification
- Kingdom: Animalia
- Phylum: Chordata
- Class: Chondrichthyes
- Subclass: Elasmobranchii
- Order: Myliobatiformes
- Family: Zanobatidae; Fowler, 1928
- Genus: Zanobatus; Garman, 1913

Species
- 2, see text

= Panray =

Panray Temporal range: Early Eocene to present

Genus of cartilaginous fishes

The panrays are a genus, Zanobatus, of rays found in coastal parts of the warm East Atlantic Ocean, ranging from Morocco to Angola. It is the only genus in the family Zanobatidae, which is included in the Myliobatiformes order, but based on genetic evidence some authorities place it in Rhinopristiformes or a sister taxon to Rhinopristiformes.

The two species of panrays are generally poorly known and one of the species was only scientifically described in 2016. They are up to about 60 cm (2 ft) long, and brownish above with a heavily mottled, blotched or barred dark pattern. They are ovoviviparous and feed on benthic invertebrates.

== Species ==
There are two recognized species in the genus:

- Zanobatus maculatus Séret, 2016
- Zanobatus schoenleinii (J. P. Müller & Henle, 1841)

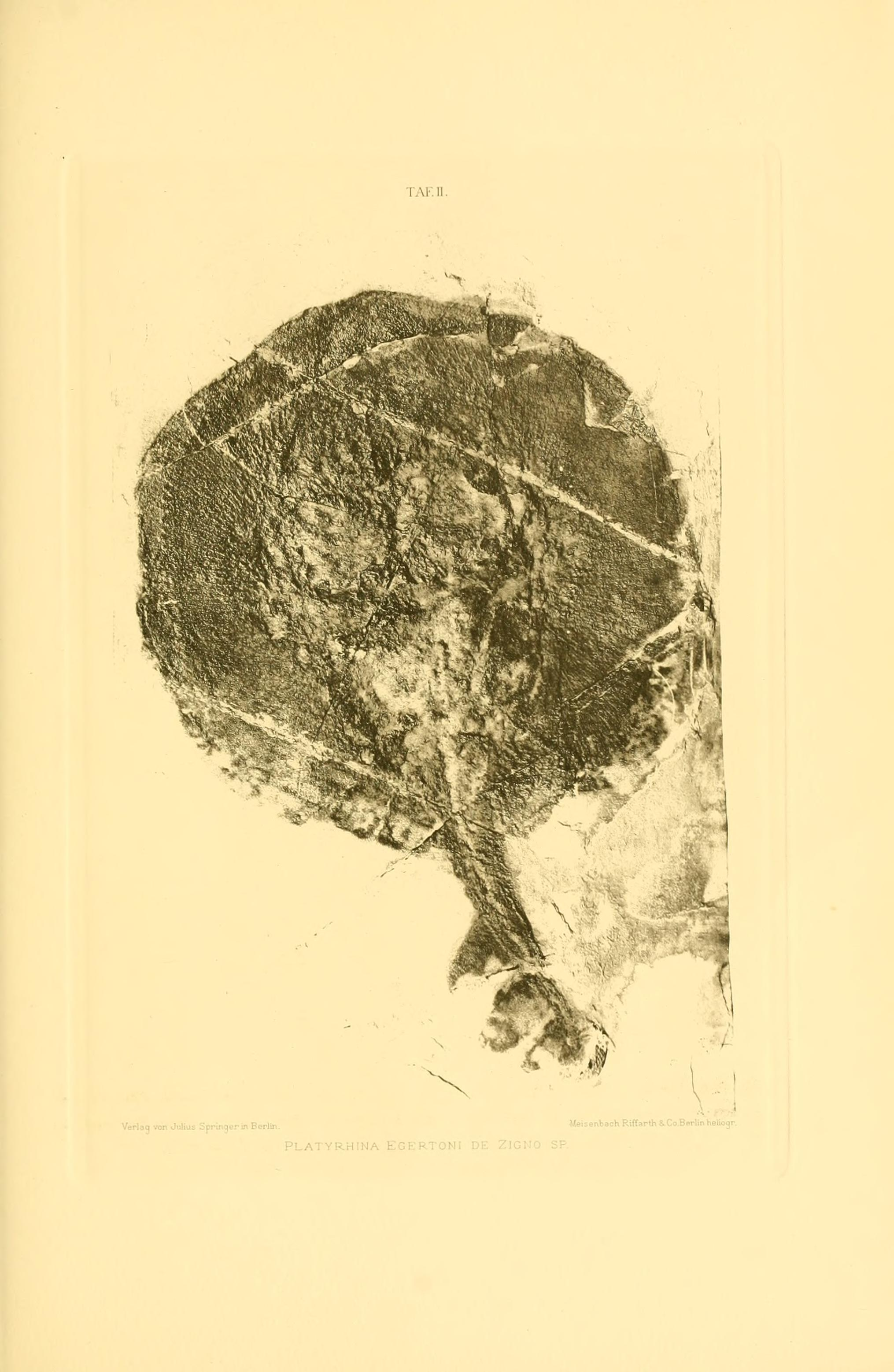
Fossil specimen of Plesiozanobatus

A fossil relative, †Plesiozanobatus Marramà et al, 2020 is known from the Early Eocene-aged Monte Bolca site of Italy.
