= Hemitrygon longicauda =

Conservation status
- Near Threatened (IUCN 3.1)

Scientific classification
- Kingdom: Animalia
- Phylum: Chordata
- Class: Chondrichthyes
- Subclass: Elasmobranchii
- Order: Myliobatiformes
- Family: Dasyatidae
- Genus: Hemitrygon
- Species: H. longicauda

Binomial name
- Hemitrygon longicauda (Last & White, 2013)

Synonyms
- Dasyatis longicauda Last & White, 2013

Species of stingray

Hemitrygon longicauda, the Merauke stingray, is a species of stingray in the family Dasyatidae.

Hemitrygon longicauda is found in the Western Pacific, where it is endemic to southern New Guinea. This species reaches a length of 31 cm (12 in).
