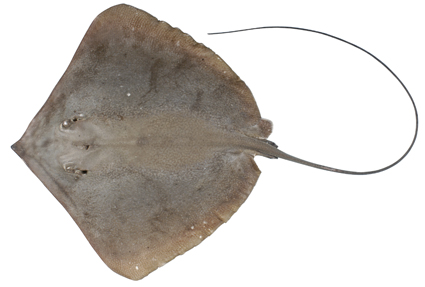

Conservation status
- Least Concern (IUCN 3.1)

Scientific classification
- Kingdom: Animalia
- Phylum: Chordata
- Class: Chondrichthyes
- Subclass: Elasmobranchii
- Order: Myliobatiformes
- Family: Dasyatidae
- Genus: Maculabatis
- Species: M. toshi

Binomial name
- Maculabatis toshi (Whitley, 1939)
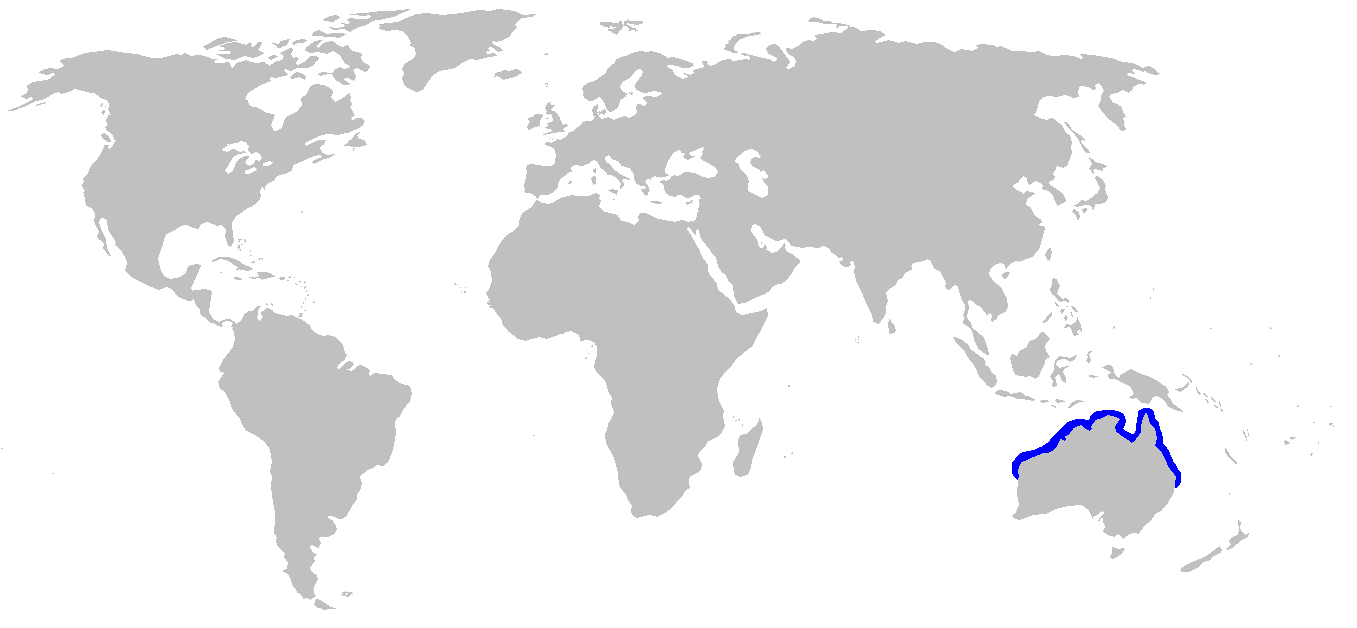
- Range of the brown whipray

Synonyms
- Himantura toshi Whitley, 1939

= Brown whipray =

Species of cartilaginous fish

The brown whipray (Maculabatis toshi) is a species of stingray in the family Dasyatidae, common in inshore, muddy habitats along the northern coast of Australia. It has often been confused in literature for the honeycomb stingray (H. uarnak) and the black-spotted whipray (H. astra), which until recently was thought to be the same species. This species has an angular, diamond-shaped pectoral fin disc and a long, very thin tail without fin folds. It is plain brown above, sometimes with white dots or flecks near the edge of the disc, and white below; the tail is dark all over, with alternating dark and light bands near the tip. The maximum recorded disc width is 74 cm (29 in).

The diet of the brown whipray consists of crustaceans and small bony fishes. Reproduction is aplacental viviparous; females produce litters of 1–2 young and supply them with histotroph ("uterine milk") during gestation. The International Union for Conservation of Nature (IUCN) has listed the brown whipray under Least Concern because most of its range lies within Australian waters, where it is caught by prawn trawlers but at only minimal levels since the mandatory installation of bycatch reduction devices. However, larger numbers are caught in the Arafura Sea and marketed for meat, skin, and cartilage.

== Taxonomy ==
The first known specimen of the brown whipray was a male 31 cm (12 in) across, collected from the estuary of the Clarence River in New South Wales. Australian ichthyologist David George Stead received it in November 1903 and reported it as a honeycomb stingray (H. uarnak). Gilbert Percy Whitley came to recognize the specimen as a distinct species and described it in a 1939 issue of Australian Zoologist, naming it in honor of Queensland marine biologist James Tosh. Nevertheless, multiple subsequent publications would continue to misidentify brown whiprays as juvenile honeycomb stingrays.

In 2004, Mabel Manjaji grouped the brown whipray with H. fai, M. gerrardi, H. jenkinsii, H. leoparda, H. uarnak, and H. undulata in the 'uarnak' species complex. The black-spotted whipray (M. astra) is a recently described, closely related species that was initially thought to be the same as M. toshi. Undescribed, related forms have also been documented from Indonesia and New Guinea. Other common names for this ray include coachwhip ray, Tosh's longtail ray, and Tosh's whipray.

== Description ==
Reaching 74 cm (29 in) across and 1.7 m (5.6 ft) long, the brown whipray has a diamond-shaped and relatively thin pectoral fin disc, measuring roughly 1.05–1.24 times wider than long. The anterior margins of the disc are nearly straight and converge at an obtuse angle on the triangular snout. The tip of the snout is pointed and slightly protruding. The eyes are moderately large and immediately followed by the spiracles. The long, thin nostrils have between them a short, wide curtain of skin with a finely fringed trailing margin. The mouth is small and bow-shaped, and contains four papillae (nipple-shaped structures) across the floor.

The pelvic fins are small and narrow. The tail is extremely thin and whip-like, without fin folds; typically one stinging spine is placed on the tail's upper surface. When intact, the tail measures 2.5–3 times as long as the disc is wide. There is a band of small, dense, heart-shaped dermal denticles extending from between the eyes to the tail, becoming larger in a midline row before and after the sting. In addition, 3–4 enlarged, spear-like thorns are present at the center of the disc, along with 1–3 preceding rows of smaller thorns that run to just behind the eyes. Minute denticles are also present on the remainder of the disc upper surface. This species is a uniform dark olive-brown above, becoming lighter towards the disc margin, and uniform white below; sometimes in larger adults there are small pale spots or flecks near the disc margin. The tail is dark above and below, with alternating black and gray bands towards the tip.

== Distribution and habitat ==
The brown whipray is found off northern Australia from Shark Bay to the Clarence River, though it has not been reported from the southeastern extent of its range for some time. Bottom-dwelling in nature, the brown whipray inhabits shallow, muddy habitats such as mangrove flats, and seems to favor more inshore waters than the black-spotted whipray. In Shark Bay, it is found in greater numbers during the warm season than the cold.

== Biology and ecology ==
The brown whipray is a predator of crustaceans and small fishes. Juveniles have been observed apparently moving with the tide to forage for food. Known parasites of this species include the tapeworms Parachristianella baverstocki, P. indonesiensis, and Zygorhynchus elongatus. Like other stingrays, the brown whipray is aplacental viviparous, with the developing embryos being sustained to term by histotroph ("uterine milk") produced by their mother. Females bear litters of 1–2 pups, each measuring 20–22 cm (7.9–8.7 in) across. Males and females mature sexually at 40 cm (16 in) and 66 cm (26 in) across respectively.

== Human interactions ==
Fairly common within its range, the brown whipray is regularly caught by intensive bottom trawl and beach seine fisheries operating in the Arafura Sea. The skin is highly valued, while the meat and cartilage are also utilized. In 1996 and 1998, this species was one of the elasmobranchs (sharks and rays) most often caught incidentally by the Northern Prawn Fishery (NPF) of northern Australia; the survival rate of captured rays seemed to be relatively high. The bycatch rate is thought to have dropped substantially since the mandatory installation of Turtle Exclusion Devices (TEDs) and other bycatch reduction devices on Australian trawlers. As most of the brown whipray's range lies within Australian waters, where it is now minimally threatened by human activity, the International Union for Conservation of Nature (IUCN) has listed it under Least Concern.

== Footnotes ==
Whitley named this ray in honor of James R. Tosh (1872-1917), who worked at the Marine Department of Queensland, as it was Tosh who reported this ray in a 1902-1903 government report. Tosh later died of heat stroke while working for the British Red Cross in Iraq during World War One.
