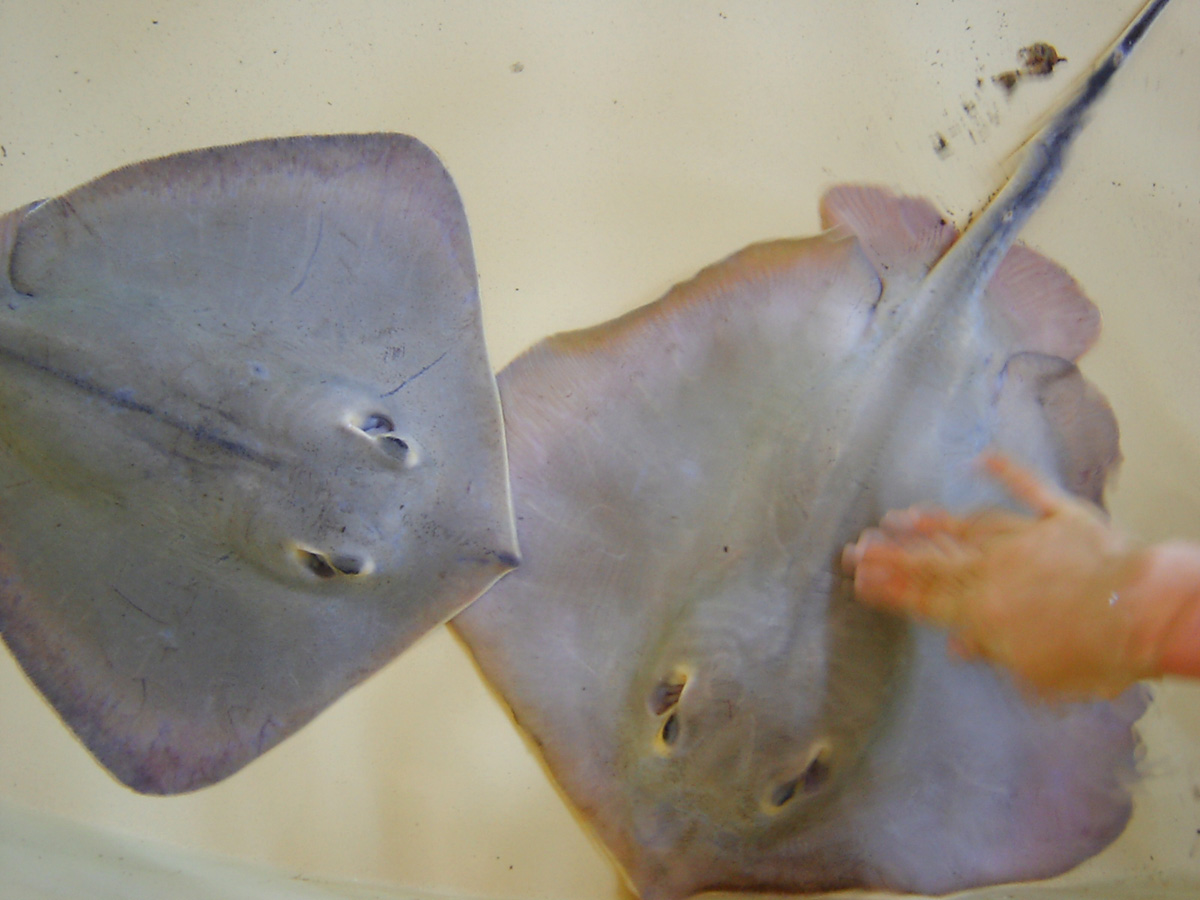

Conservation status
- Near Threatened (IUCN 3.1)

Scientific classification
- Kingdom: Animalia
- Phylum: Chordata
- Class: Chondrichthyes
- Subclass: Elasmobranchii
- Order: Myliobatiformes
- Family: Dasyatidae
- Genus: Hemitrygon
- Species: H. akajei

Binomial name
- Hemitrygon akajei (J. P. Müller & Henle, 1841)

Synonyms
- Trygon akajei Müller & Henle, 1841

= Red stingray =

Species of cartilaginous fish

The red stingray (Hemitrygon akajei) is a species of stingray in the family Dasyatidae, found in the northwestern Pacific Ocean off Japan, Korea, and China, and possibly elsewhere. It primarily inhabits shallow, sandy habitats close to shore, and has been known to enter brackish water. The red stingray has a diamond-shaped pectoral fin disc and gains its common name from its bright orange-red underside; there may also be patches of orange at various spots on its upper surface. Most individuals are no more than 1 m (3.3 ft) long.

Feeding mainly on crustaceans and bony fishes, the red stingray plays a key ecological role as an apex predator in its environment. Reproduction is aplacental viviparous, with females giving birth to 1 or up to 10 pups at a time. The red stingray is valued as food in Japan; large numbers are caught as bycatch and brought to market, which has seemingly led to a population decline in this unprolific species. As a result, the International Union for Conservation of Nature (IUCN) has assessed it as Near Threatened.

== Taxonomy ==
The original description of the red stingray was published by Johannes Müller and Friedrich Henle in their 1841 Systematische Beschreibung der Plagiostomen under the name Trygon akajei, based on an earlier account of "Pastinaca akajei" by Heinrich Bürger. A lectotype for this species was designated by Marinus Boeseman in 1947. Other common names for the red stingray include brown stingray, estuary stingaree, Japanese red stingray, Japanese stingray, red skate, whip ray, whip stingray, and yellow stingray.

== Distribution and habitat ==
The red stingray may be endemic to the northwestern Pacific Ocean; it is found throughout Japanese coastal waters from Hokkaidō to Okinawa, and also occurs off Korea, mainland China and Taiwan. This species has been reported from as far as Thailand, the Philippines, Fiji, and Tuvalu. However, whether these records truly represent D. akajei has yet to be determined. The red stingray is commonly encountered in sandy areas close to shore and in bays at a depth of 10 m (33 ft) or more, but also inhabits muddy flats, coral reefs, and estuaries.

== Description ==
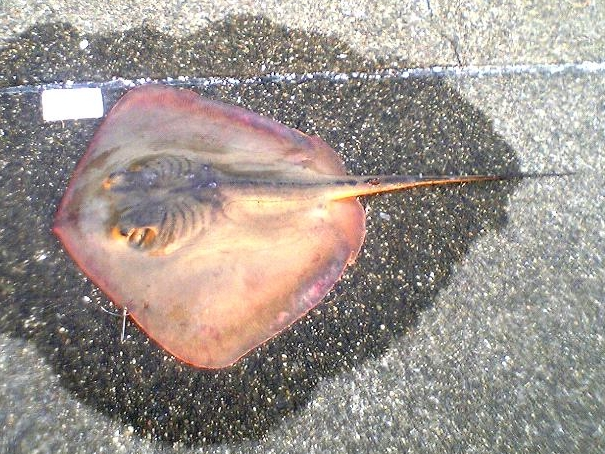

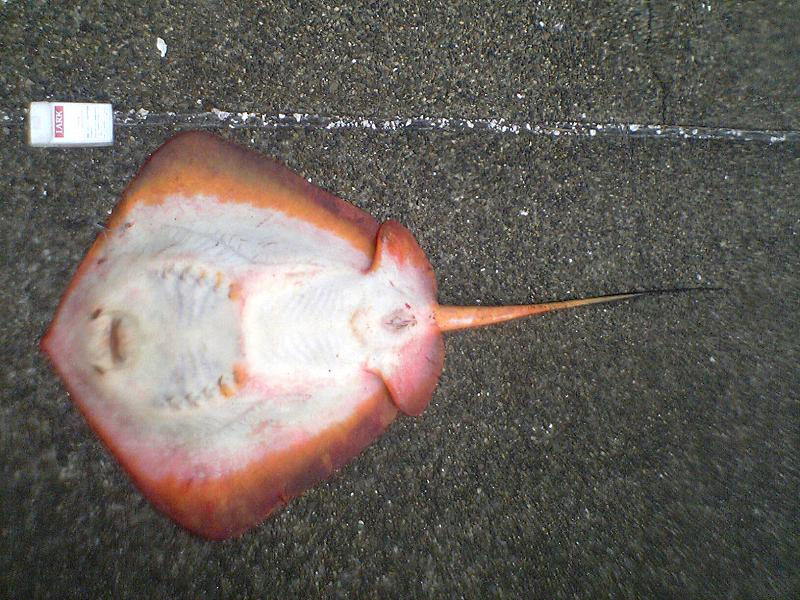
The red stingray has orange coloration on its dorsal and ventral surfaces.

The red stingray can grow to 2 m (6.6 ft) long and 0.66 m (2.2 ft) across, though most do not exceed 1 m (3.3 ft) in length. The maximum recorded weight is 10.7 kg (24 lb). It has a diamond-shaped pectoral fin disc wider than long, with nearly straight front margins converging to a triangular snout. The small eyes are slightly elevated, and followed by spiracles that are almost twice as large. There is a thick flap of skin between the large nares. The teeth are arranged with a quincunx pattern into a pavement-like surface. Females and juveniles have blunt teeth, while adult males have pointed, recurved teeth. There is a row of 3 papillae across the floor of the mouth, sometimes with up to 2 pairs of accessory papillae alongside.

The tail is whip-like and measures 1–1.5 times as long as the disc is wide. A long, serrated spine originates in the first third of the tail, and is followed by a low dorsal keel and a ventral fin fold. Young rays have smooth skin, while adults have a patch of small dermal denticles between and behind the eyes, and a row of thorns along the midline of the back. There are 1–6 tubercles in front of the tail spine, and numerous small denticles behind. This species is plain brown above, often with yellow or orange coloring before the eyes, behind the spiracles, around the disc margin, and laterally on the tail in front of the spine. The tail darkens to nearly black towards the tip and on the ventral fin fold. The underside is white with bright orange-red patches. The Mekong freshwater stingray (D. laosensis) is also characterized by orange ventral coloration and has some similar meristic counts to this species, but differs in disc shape, denticle coverage, and dorsal coloration.

== Biology and ecology ==
As an apex predator in nearshore demersal food webs, the red stingray plays a significant ecological role. Crustaceans are the most important component of its diet, followed by small bony fishes and then annelid worms, while molluscs are seldom consumed. In Tokyo Bay, important crustacean prey species are Crangon affinis for males, Oratosquilla ijimai for females, and Anisomysis ijimai for juveniles; the most important fish prey species is Sardinops melanostictus, followed by Conger myriaster. Like other stingrays, the red stingray is aplacental viviparous. During courtship, the male follows the female and bites at her pectoral fin disc, using his pointed teeth to gain a grip for copulation. The litter size has been variously reported as only 1 or up to 10. Males mature sexually at a disc width of 35–40 cm (14–16 in), and females at a disc width of 50–55 cm (20–22 in).

Known parasites of the red stingray include the tapeworms Acanthobothrium macrocephalum, Rhodobothrium pulvinatum, and Tetragonocephalum akajeinensis, the monogeneans Dendromonocotyle akajeii and Heterocotyle chinensis, the leech Pterobdella amara, the nematodes Porrocaecum laymani and Terranova amoyensis, the copepod Trebius akajeii, and the pranzia larvae of the isopod Gnathia capillata.

== Human interactions ==
The venomous tail spine of the red stingray is potentially injurious to humans. The Ainu once used the dried tail spine, with the toxic sheath intact, as a weapon. This species is an incidental catch of commercial fisheries targeting flounder and other bottom-dwelling fishes, using bottom trawls, gillnets, set nets, and line gear. It is valued as food in Japan, especially in the Tokyo Bay area where it is consumed in autumn and winter; it may be prepared hard boiled, with miso soup, or as kamaboko. However, the small size of the red stingray limits its economic importance. Annual catches reported by Japanese fisheries have steadily declined from 20,000 tons in 1950 to varying between 3,959 and 5,388 tons from 1997 to 2004. Such apparent depletion, coupled with continuing heavy fishing pressure and a slow reproductive rate, have led the International Union for Conservation of Nature (IUCN) to assess this species as Near Threatened.
