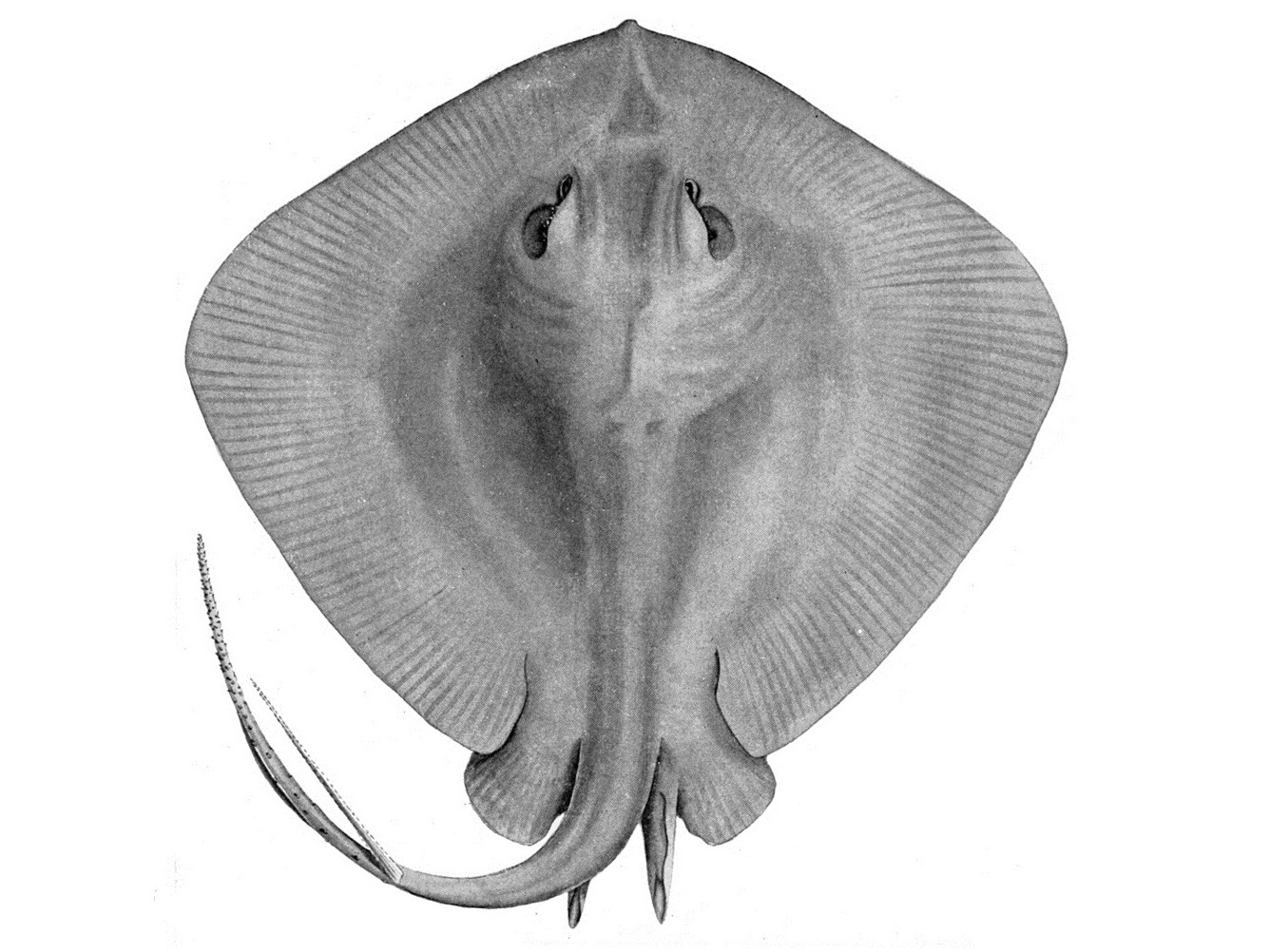
- Short-tail stingray, Dasyatis brevicaudata

Scientific classification
- Kingdom: Animalia
- Phylum: Chordata
- Class: Chondrichthyes
- Subclass: Elasmobranchii
- Division: Batomorphi
- Order: Myliobatiformes; Compagno, 1973

Type species
- Myliobatis aquila Linnaeus, 1758

Families
- See text

= Myliobatiformes =

Myliobatiformes Temporal range: Early Cretaceous to recent

Order of cartilaginous fishes

Myliobatiformes (/mɪliˈɒbətɪfɔːrmiːz/), commonly known as stingrays, are one of the four orders of batoids, cartilaginous fishes related to sharks. They are members of the subclass elasmobranchs. They were formerly included in the order Rajiformes, but more recent phylogenetic studies have shown the Myliobatiformes to be a monophyletic group, and its more derived members evolved their highly flattened shapes independently of the skates.

== Characteristics ==
Myliobatiformes share physical characteristics of a long, thin tail with serrated spines and a pancake-like body. They share many characteristics with the batoid order Rajiformes, in which they were previously included. The key difference of the orders is the Myliobatiformes' single-lobed pelvic fin, lack of a mid-tail spine, and general lack of a dorsal fin. Myliobatiformes also possess stinging spines along the tail's base, and generally possess large pectoral fins that are completely fused (except Myliobatidae) to the head. They can camouflage themselves from predators using their flat, disk-shaped bodies to lie against the seafloor.

== Classification ==
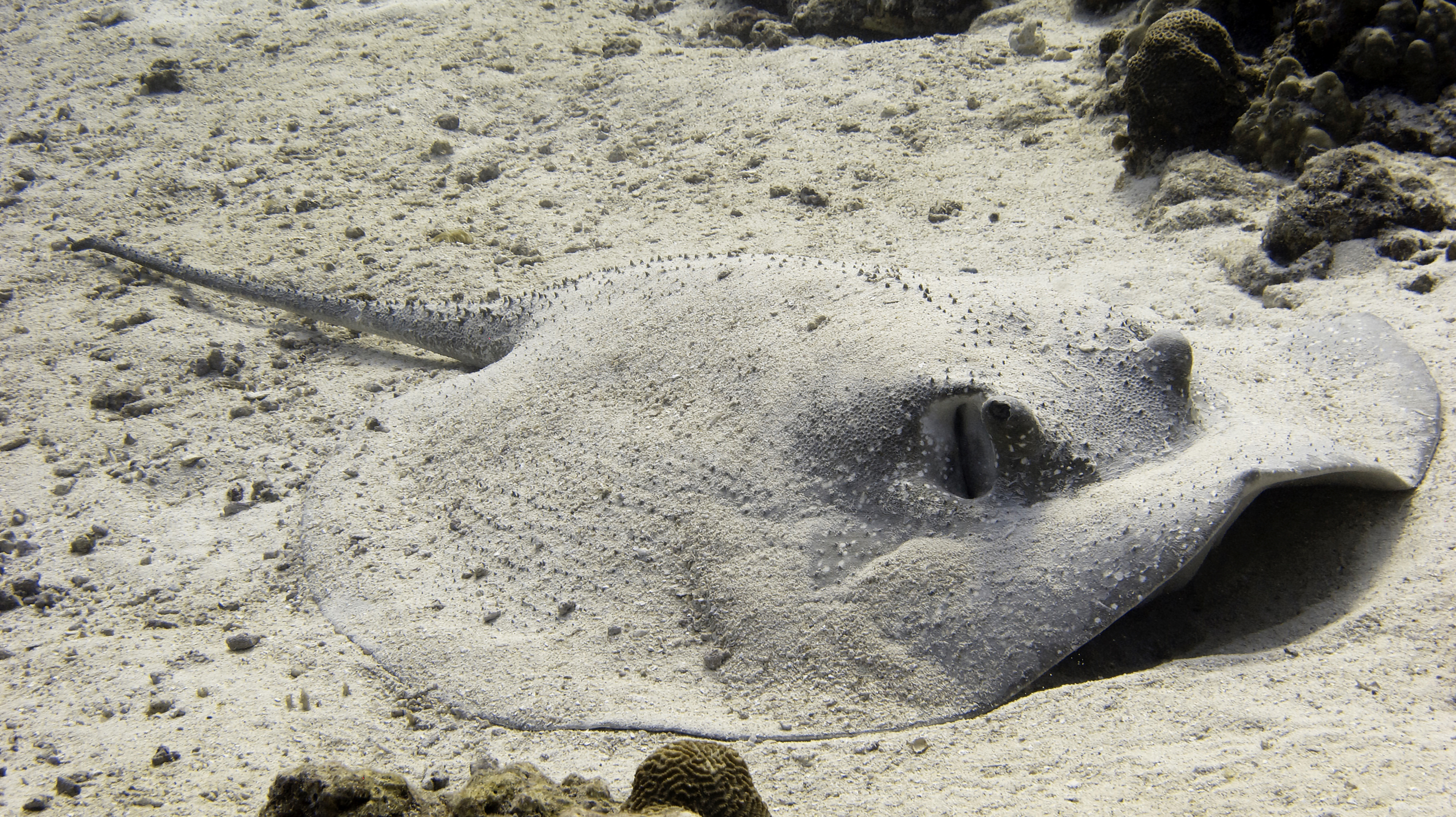
Camouflaged porcupine ray

Myliobatiformes is classified as follows in Eschmeyer's Catalog of Fishes:

- Family Zanobatidae Fowler. 1934 (panrays)

Suborder Myliobatoidei Compagno, 1973

- Family Hexatrygonidae Heemstra & M. M. Smith, 1980 (sixgill stingrays)
- Family Dasyatidae D. S. Jordan & Gilbert, 1879 (whiptail stingrays)
  - Subfamily Dasyatinae D. S. Jordan & Gilbert, 1879 (stingrays)
  - Subfamily Neotrygoninae Castelnau, 1873 (shortsnout stingrays)
  - Subfamily Urogymninae Gray, 1851 (whiprays)
  - Subfamily Hypolophinae Stromer, 1910 (cowtail stingrays)
- Family Potamotrygonidae Garman, 1877 (neotropical stingrays)
  - Subfamily Styracurinae Carvalho, Loboda & da Silva 2016 (whiptail stingrays)
  - Subfamily Potamotrygoninae Garman 1877 (river stingrays)
- Family Urotrygonidae McEachran, Dunn & Miyake, 1996 (American round stingrays)
- Family Gymnuridae Fowler, 1934 (butterfly rays)
- Family Plesiobatidae K. Nishida, 1990 (deepwater stingrays or giant stingarees)
- Family Urolophidae J. P. Müller & Henle 1841 (round stingrays or stingarees)
- Family Aetobatidae Agassiz, 1858 (pelagic eagle rays)
- Family Myliobatidae Bonaparte 1835 (eagle rays)
- Family Rhinopteridae D. S, Jordan & Evermann, 1896 (cownose rays)
- Family Mobulidae Gill, 1893 (mantas or devil rays)

The family Aetobatidae is recognised by some authorities. It contains the genus Aetobatus, which is otherwise part of Myliobatidae.

The families Myliobatidae and †Rhombodontidae are sometimes grouped in their own superfamily, Myliobatoidea.

Cladogram from Rays of the World (2016):

- Myliobatiformes
  - Zanobatidae
  - - Hexatrygonidae
    - - Gymnuridae
      - - - Plesiobatidae
          - Urolophidae
        - - - - Myliobatidae
              - Aetobatidae
            - - Mobulidae
              - Rhinopteridae
          - - Dasyatidae 1
            - - Dasyatidae 2 (paraphyly)
              - - Potamotrygonidae
                - Urotrygonidae
