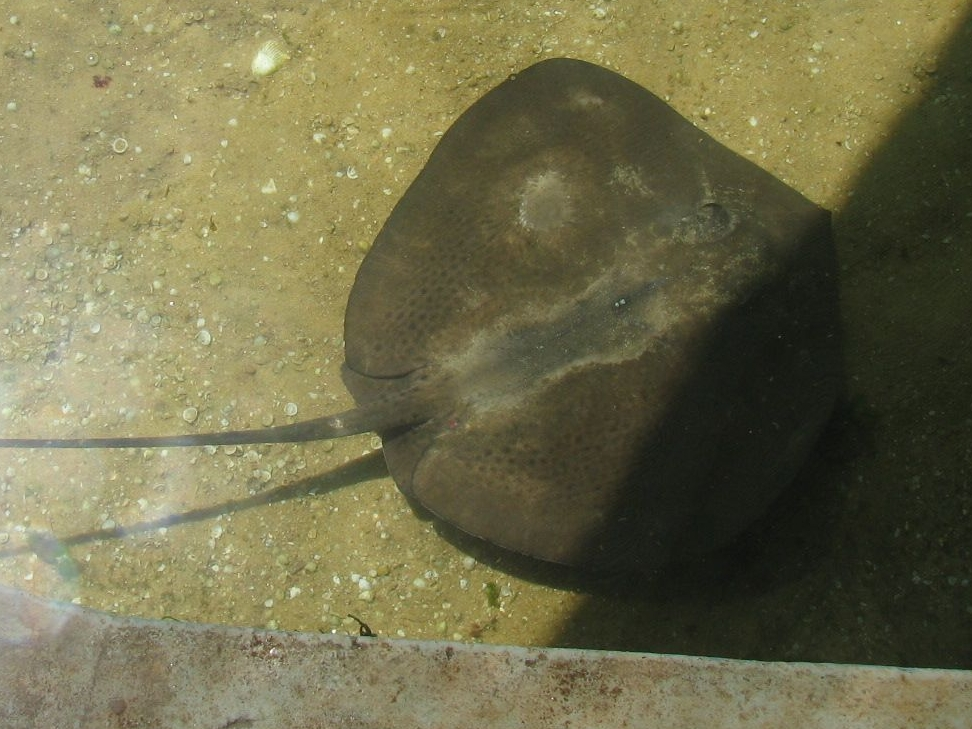

Conservation status
- Near Threatened (IUCN 3.1)

Scientific classification
- Kingdom: Animalia
- Phylum: Chordata
- Class: Chondrichthyes
- Subclass: Elasmobranchii
- Order: Myliobatiformes
- Family: Dasyatidae
- Genus: Maculabatis
- Species: M. astra

Binomial name
- Maculabatis astra Last, Manjaji-Matsumoto & Pogonoski, 2008
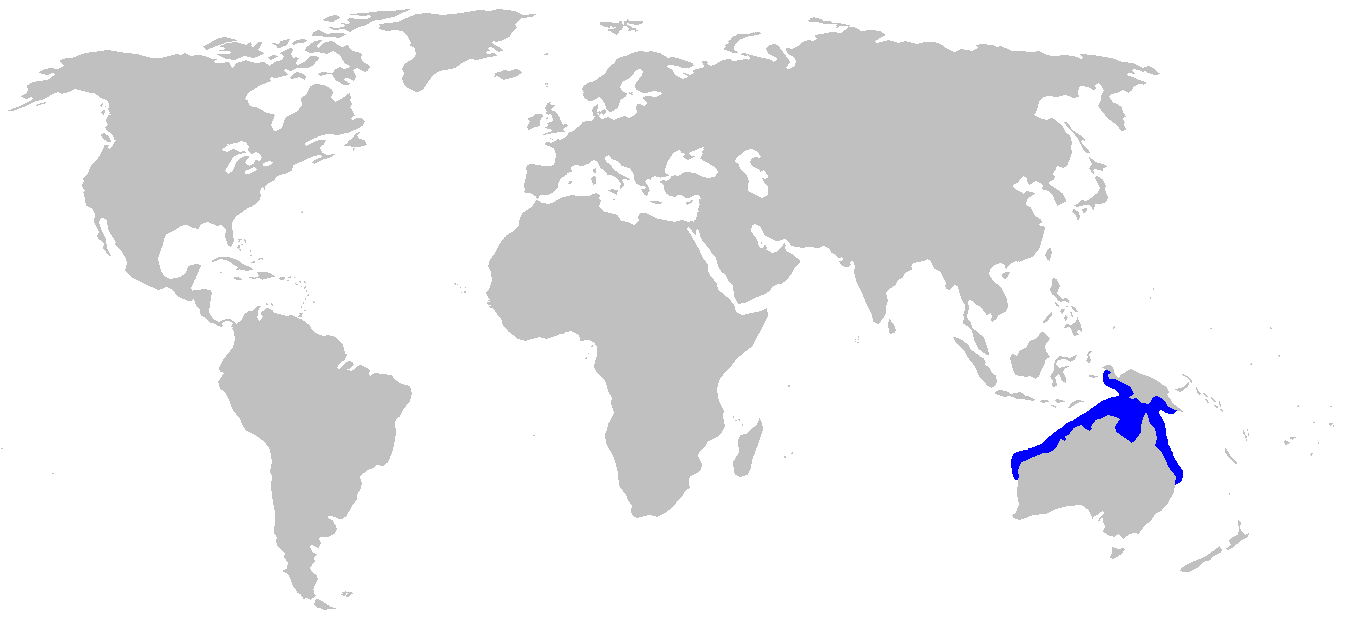
- Range of the black-spotted whipray

Synonyms
- Himantura astra Last, Manjaji-Matsumoto & Pogonoski, 2008

= Black-spotted whipray =

Species of fish

The black-spotted whipray (Maculabatis astra) is a species of stingray in the family Dasyatidae, found in the coastal waters off southern New Guinea and northern Australia. Long thought to be a variant of the related brown whipray (M. toshi), this species has an angular, diamond-shaped pectoral fin disc and a whip-like tail without fin folds. It is characterized by its dorsal color pattern, which consists of a variably extensive covering of small, close-set dark, and sometimes also white spots, on a grayish-brown background. In addition, the tail has alternating light and dark saddles past the stinging spine. This species reaches a maximum recorded width of 80 cm (31 in).

Crustaceans are the main type of food consumed by the black-spotted whipray. It is aplacental viviparous, with females gestating 1–3 young at a time, supplying them with histotroph ("uterine milk"). Most of the black-spotted whipray's range lies within Australian waters, where it faces minimal conservation threats since the widespread deployment of bycatch-reducing measures on commercial trawlers. It is caught in small numbers for meat, skin, and cartilage by Indonesian fishers, as well as by prawn seine fishers off Papua New Guinea. A 2004 assessment of the brown whipray by the International Union for Conservation of Nature (IUCN), which also included data on the black-spotted whipray, listed them under Least Concern.

== Taxonomy ==
The black-spotted whipray was traditionally thought to be the same species as the brown whipray (H. toshi). In 1994, Commonwealth Scientific and Industrial Research Organisation (CSIRO) researchers Peter Last and John Stevens tentatively identified a spotted variant of H. toshi as "Himantura sp. A". However, it was not until more specimens became available for study in the mid-2000s that the black-spotted whipray was confirmed as distinct, albeit closely related, species to H. toshi. Last, Mabel Manjaji-Matsumoto, and John Pogonoski formally described it in a 2008 CSIRO publication, giving it the specific epithet astra after the Latin astrum ("constellation"). The type specimen is an adult male 59 cm (23 in) across, collected from the Gulf of Carpentaria. Like T. toshi, this species belongs to the 'uarnak' species complex, which also contains H. fai, H. gerrardi, H. jenkinsii, H. leoparda, H. uarnak, and H. undulata. Other common names for the black-spotted whipray include coachwhip ray, Tosh's longtail ray, and wulura.

== Description ==
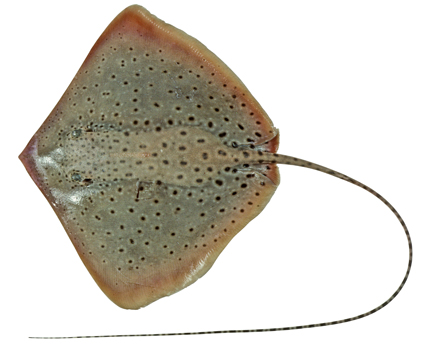
The black-spotted whipray has black spots on its disc and alternating dark and light saddles on its tail.

The black-spotted whipray can grow to 80 cm (31 in) across and 1.8 m (5.9 ft) long; reports of rays 1 m (3.3 ft) or more across are likely in error. It has a diamond-shaped, relatively thin pectoral fin disc approximately 1.1–1.2 times wider than long. The outer corners of the disc are fairly angular, and the leading margins are nearly straight. The snout is triangular and forms a broadly obtuse angle with a barely protruding, pointed tip. The eyes are small and immediately followed by larger, oval spiracles. The long, slender nostrils have a short, skirt-shaped curtain of skin between them; the posterior margin of the curtain is concave on either side and finely fringed. The mouth is strongly bow-shaped and contains a row of four papillae (nipple-like structures) across the floor. The small, blunt teeth number 41–49 rows in the upper jaw and 40–50 rows in the lower jaw.

The pelvic fins are small and somewhat narrow, with a curving posterior margin; males have stout claspers. The very thin, gently tapering whip-like tail measures 2.1–2.7 times as long as the disc is wide, and lacks fin folds. One or two slender stinging spines are present atop the tail; many individuals have the sting missing. Behind the sting, there is a deep ventral groove and prominent lateral ridges running to the tip of the tail. The upper surface of the disc is densely covered by tiny heart-shaped dermal denticles in a wide central band from between the eyes to entirely cover the tail, with those at the center of the disc are slightly larger and spear-shaped. Newborns lack denticles; the denticles on the "shoulders" and head are the first to develop. This species is grayish brown above, with many small dark spots covering all or part of the disc and tail base; sometimes there are also subtle to prominent white spots, that may be arranged into rosettes surrounding the dark spots or into indistinct rings ("pseudo-ocelli"). The tail past the sting bears alternating light and dark saddles; these form complete bands in juveniles under 50 cm (20 in) across. The spots of rays under 30 cm (12 in) across are proportionately larger and widely spaced. The upper half of the eyeball is spotted while the lower half is white. The disc and tail are plain white beneath.

== Distribution and habitat ==
The black-spotted whipray is found widely off northern Australia from Shark Bay in Western Australia and Moreton Bay in Queensland, including the Timor Sea, and is particularly abundant in the Gulf of Carpentaria. It has also been reported from off southern New Guinea. This bottom-dwelling species inhabits coastal waters 1–141 m (3.3–462.6 ft) deep, favoring sandy habitats, and tends to be found farther from shore than the brown whipray. In Shark Bay, it is found in greater numbers during the warm season than the cold.

== Biology and ecology ==
Over 90% of the black-spotted whipray's diet consists of crustaceans. In the Gulf of Carpentaria, it is a major predator of penaeid prawns, which constitute over half of its diet. Shrimp are the predominant prey of young rays under 23 cm (9.1 in) across, while stomatopods and crabs become more important with age. For rays off Queensland and in the Torres Strait, polychaete worms constitute an important secondary food source to crustaceans. This species has also been known to take bony fishes. Like other stingrays, the black-spotted whipray is aplacental viviparous, with females nourishing their young with nutrient-rich histotroph ("uterine milk"). Females have a single functionary ovary and uterus (on the left), and produce litters of 1–3 pups. The newborns measure 17–19 cm (6.7–7.5 in) across; both sexes mature at about 46–50 cm (18–20 in) across. The growth rate is relatively low, with females growing much more slowly than males.

== Human interactions ==
The International Union for Conservation of Nature's (IUCN) 2004 assessment of the brown whipray (which at the time also included the black-spotted whipray), listed it under Least Concern. Their range off northern Australia was noted to be large and relatively protected from fishing pressure, as the mandatory implementation of Turtle Exclusion Devices (TEDs) on bottom trawls has greatly reduced bycatch mortality. In Indonesian waters, small numbers of black-spotted whiprays are caught and marketed for their skin, which is extremely valuable, and also meat and cartilage. Off Papua New Guinea, juveniles are an infrequent, incidental catch of seine net fishers targeting penaeid prawns.
