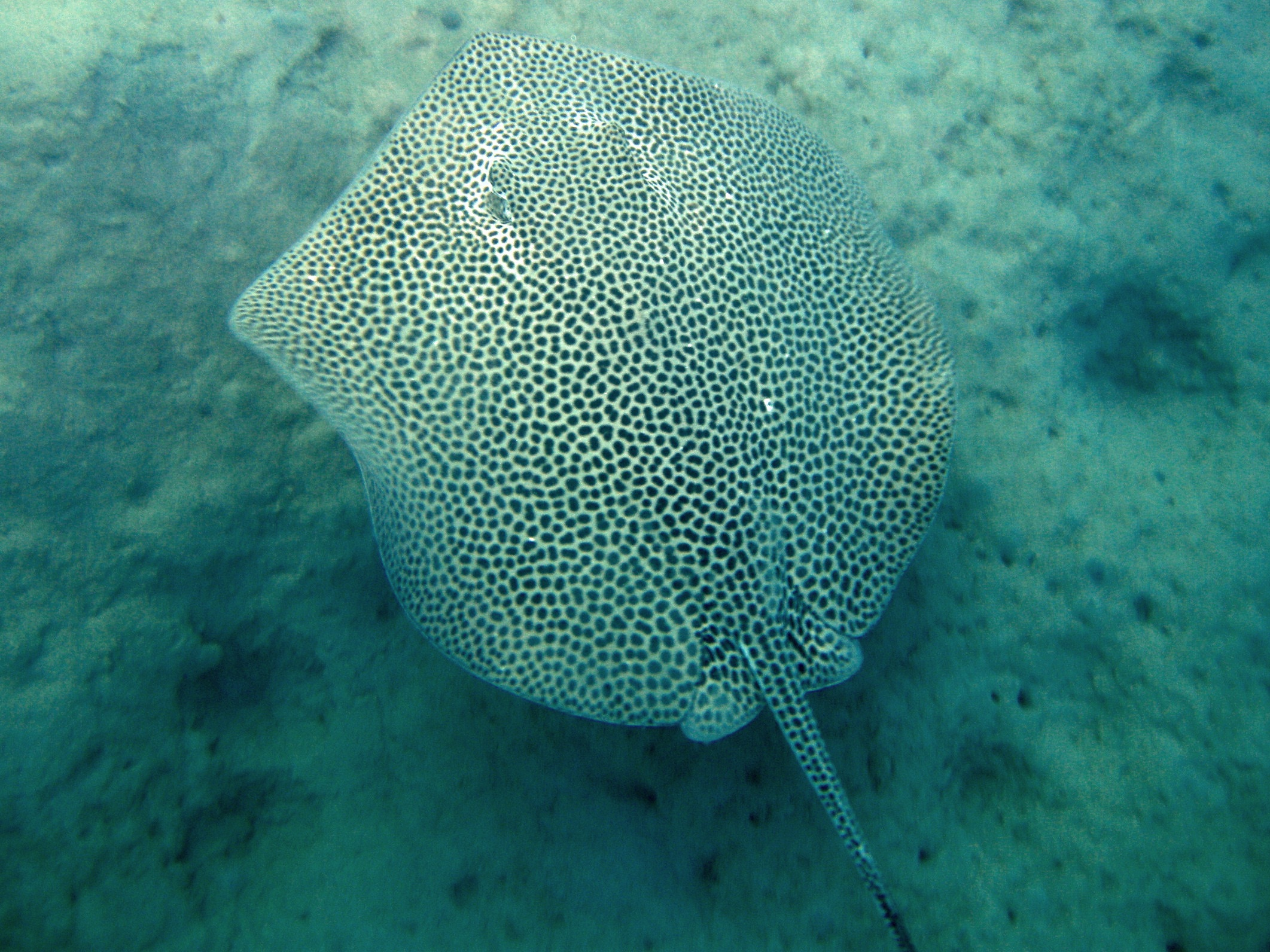
- Reticulate whipray (Himantura uarnak)

Scientific classification
- Kingdom: Animalia
- Phylum: Chordata
- Class: Chondrichthyes
- Subclass: Elasmobranchii
- Order: Myliobatiformes
- Family: Dasyatidae
- Subfamily: Urogymninae
- Genus: Himantura; J. P. Müller & Henle, 1837

Type species
- Raja sephen uarnak J. F. Gmelin, 1789

= Himantura =

Himantura Temporal range: 37.2–0 Ma Oligocene to Present

Genus of cartilaginous fishes

Himantura is a genus of stingray in the family Dasyatidae that is native to the Indo-Pacific. In a 2016 taxonomic revision, many of the species formerly assigned to Himantura were reassigned to other genera (Brevitrygon, Fluvitrygon, Maculabatis, Pateobatis, Styracura and Urogymnus).

== Species ==
Twelve extant species are currently recognized as valid, formerly four or five species.

- Himantura alcockii (Annandale, 1909) (Pale-spot whip ray)
- Himantura australis (Last, White & Naylor, 2016) (Australian whipray)
- Himantura fava (Annandale, 1909) (Honeycomb whipray)
- Himantura fluviatilis (Hamilton, 1822) (Ganges whipray)
- Himantura krempfi (Chabanaud, 1923) (Marbled freshwater whip ray)
- Himantura leoparda (Manjaji-Matsumoto & Last, 2008) (Leopard whipray)
- Himantura marginata (Blyth, 1860) (Blackedge whipray)
- †Himantura menoni (Sahni & Mehrotra, 1981)
- Himantura microphthalma (J. T. F. Chen, 1948) (Smalleye whip ray)
- Himantura pareh (Bleeker, 1852)
- †Himantura souarfortuna (Adnet et al., 2020)
- Himantura tutul (Borsa, Durand, K. N. Shen, Arlyza, Solihin & Berrebi, 2013) (Fine-spotted leopard whipray)
- Himantura uarnak (J. F. Gmelin, 1789) (Reticulate whipray)
- Himantura undulata (Bleeker, 1852) (Honeycomb whipray)

The fine-spotted leopard whipray, Himantura tutul has had its validity disputed and has been considered a junior synonym of H. uarnak by the Catalog of Fishes. However, H. tutul was previously confused not with H. uarnak, but with H. leoparda, and shown to be genetically distinct and reproductively isolated from both H. uarnak and H. leoparda. Both adult H. leoparda and H. tutul present leopard-like ocellated spots. These are smaller and more numerous in H. tutul.

== Synonyms ==
Data from:

- Himantura alcocki: synonym of Himantura alcockii
- Himantura astra: synonym of Maculabatis astra
- Himantura bleekeri: synonym of Pateobatis bleekeri
- Himantura chaophraya: synonym of Urogymnus polylepis
- Himantura chaophrya: synonym of Urogymnus polylepis
- Himantura dalyensis: synonym of Urogymnus dalyensis
- Himantura draco: synonym of Pateobatis jenkinsii
- Himantura fai: synonym of Pateobatis fai
- Himantura gerrardi: synonym of Maculabatis gerrardi
- Himantura granulata: synonym of Urogymnus granulatus
- Himantura heterurus: synonym of Brevitrygon heterura
- Himantura hortlei: synonym of Pateobatis hortlei
- Himantura imbricata: synonym of Brevitrygon imbricata
- Himantura javaensis: synonym of Brevitrygon javaensis
- Himantura jenkinsii: synonym of Pateobatis jenkinsii
- Himantura lobistoma: synonym of Urogymnus lobistoma
- Himantura oxyrhyncha: synonym of Fluvitrygon oxyrhynchus
- Himantura pacifica: synonym of Styracura pacifica
- Himantura pastinacoides: synonym of Maculabatis pastinacoides
- Himantura polylepis: synonym of Urogymnus polylepis
- Himantura ponapensis: synonym of Urogymnus granulatus
- Himantura punctata: synonym of Himantura uarnak
- Himantura randalli: synonym of Maculabatis randalli
- Himantura schmardae: synonym of Styracura schmardae
- Himantura signifer: synonym of Fluvitrygon signifer
- Himantura toshi: synonym of Maculabatis toshi
- Himantura uarnacoides: synonym of Pateobatis uarnacoides
- Himantura walga: synonym of Brevitrygon walga
