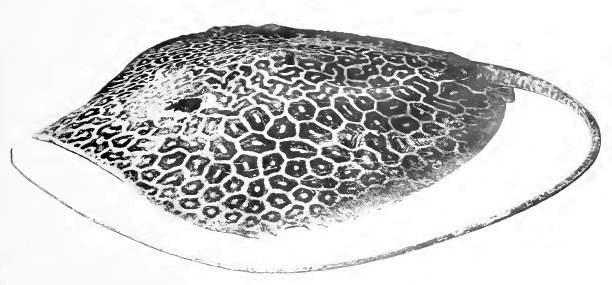
- Annandale's 1909 illustration of Himantura fava

Scientific classification
- Kingdom: Animalia
- Phylum: Chordata
- Class: Chondrichthyes
- Subclass: Elasmobranchii
- Order: Myliobatiformes
- Family: Dasyatidae
- Genus: Himantura
- Species: H. fava

Binomial name
- Himantura fava (Annandale, 1909)

Synonyms
- Dasyatis favus (Annandale, 1909); Trygon fava Annandale, 1909; Trygon favus Annandale, 1909

= Himantura fava =

Species of cartilaginous fish

Himantura fava, the honeycomb whipray, is a species of stingray in the family Dasyatidae. It is found in coastal regions including estuaries, in the Indo-Pacific off India, Indonesia, and the Gulf of Thailand. As presently defined, it is probably a species complex.

== Taxonomy ==
The first known specimens of this species were two 130 cm (4.3 ft) wide adult females collected near Orissa, India by the steamer Golden Crown, and described by Scottish zoologist Nelson Annandale in a 1909 issue of Memoirs of the Indian Museum. He remarked that it was closely allied to Himantura uarnak with the main distinguishing feature being the mouth. Smaller differences included a yellow, as opposed to white, reticulated pattern on the dorsal surface, and the lack of stellate denticles.

The species has had a confused taxonomic history. Many sources still consider H. fava to be a synonym of Himantura undulata.

== Description ==
This species is characterized by absence of skin fold on the ventral surface of the tail, in common with other Himantura species. The main body disc is somewhat quadrangular. The whip-like tail is variably banded. The pattern on the upper surface of the disc is related to age; adults have widely spaced, honeycomb-like reticulations, whereas juveniles display relatively large spots.

== Human interactions ==
It is the target of commercial fisheries in Indonesia, primarily for its skin which is of high value for use as galuchat. The meat is consumed, and the cartilage also finds a commercial use.
