= Coachwhip ray =

Coachwhip ray may refer to:

- Black-spotted whipray (Himantura astra)
- Brown whipray (Himantura toshi)
- Honeycomb stingray (Himantura uarnak)
- Mangrove whipray (Himantura granulata)
