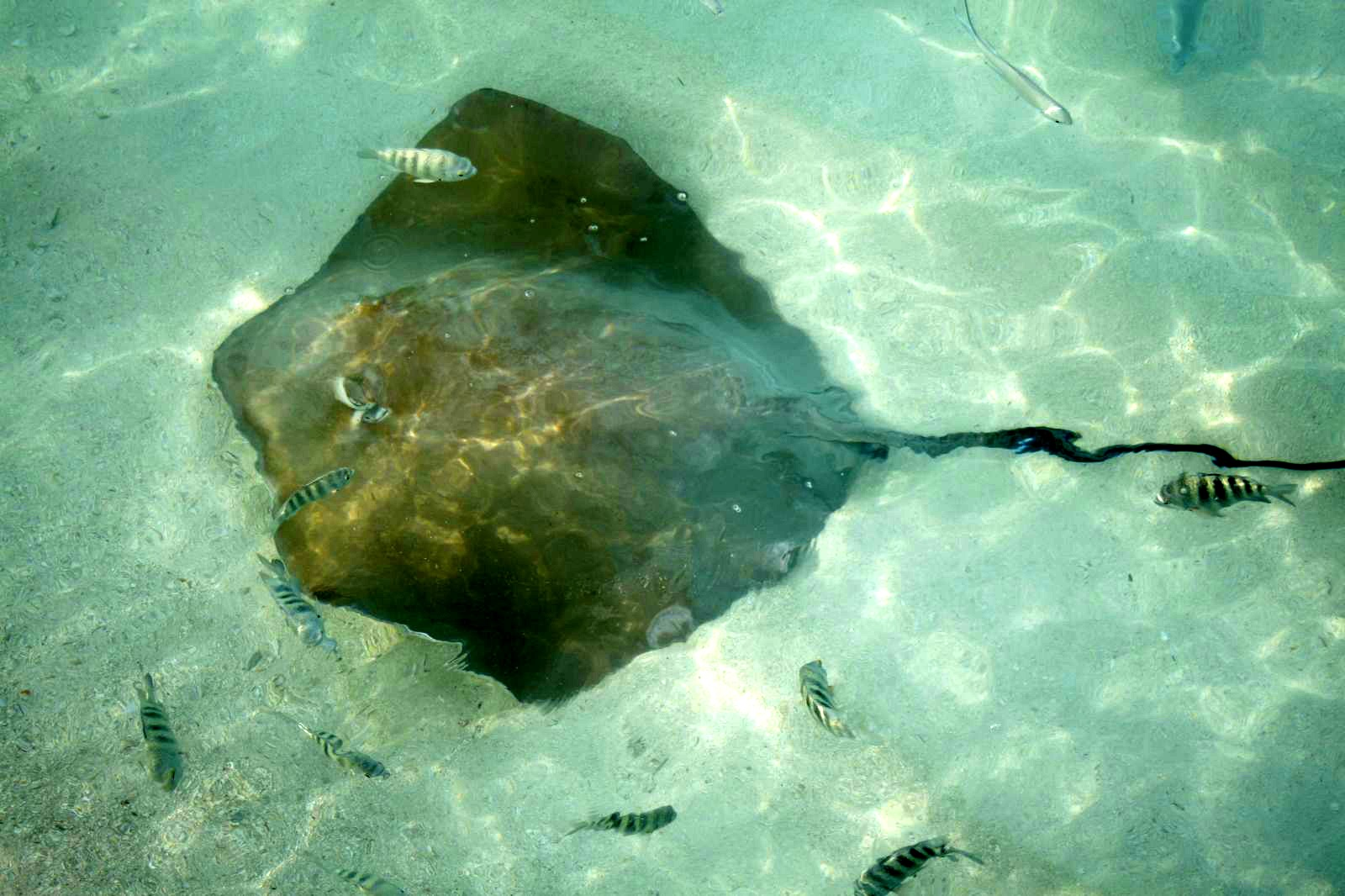

Conservation status
- Endangered (IUCN 3.1)

Scientific classification
- Kingdom: Animalia
- Phylum: Chordata
- Class: Chondrichthyes
- Subclass: Elasmobranchii
- Order: Myliobatiformes
- Family: Dasyatidae
- Genus: Pateobatis
- Species: P. jenkinsii

Binomial name
- Pateobatis jenkinsii (Annandale, 1909)
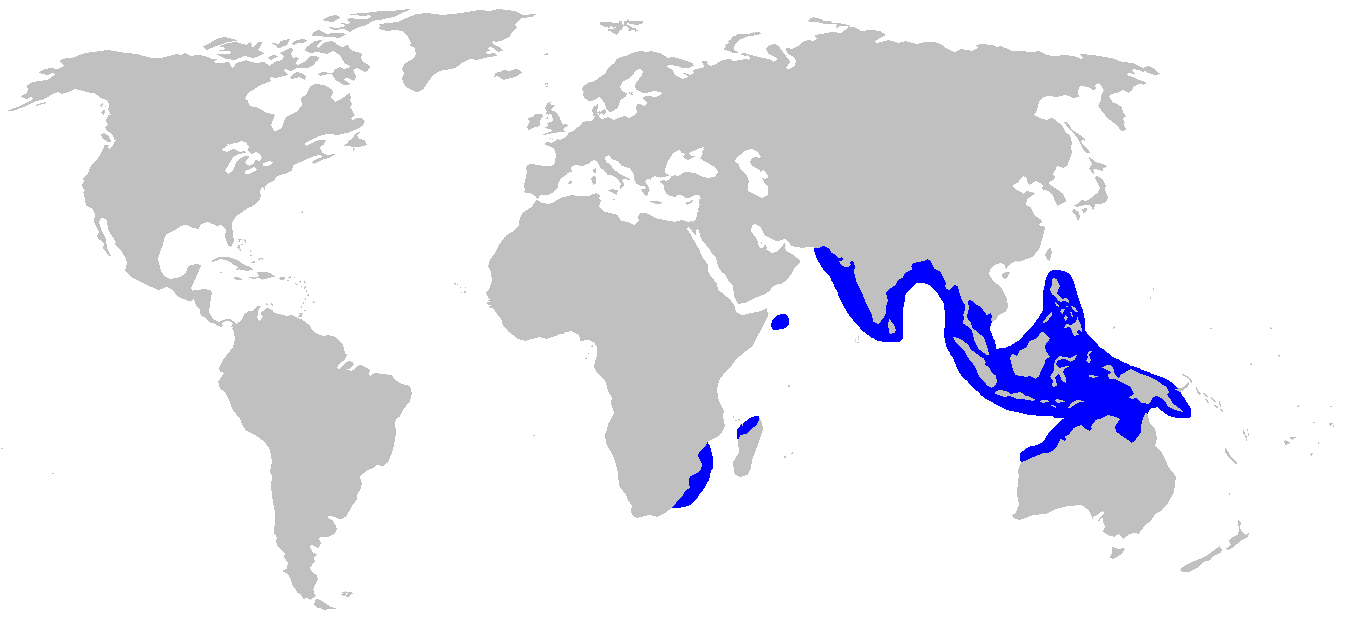
- Range of the Jenkins' whipray

Synonyms
- Himantura draco Compagno & Heemstra, 1984; Trygon jenkinsii Annandale, 1909

= Jenkins' whipray =

Species of cartilaginous fish

The Jenkins' whipray (Pateobatis jenkinsii) is a species of stingray in the family Dasyatidae, with a wide distribution in the Indo-Pacific region from South Africa to the Malay Archipelago to northern Australia. This large species grows to 1.5 m (4.9 ft) across and has a broad, diamond-shaped pectoral fin disc and a whip-like tail without fin folds. It has a band of heart-shaped dermal denticles running from between the eyes to the tail on its upper surface, along with a characteristic row of large spear-like thorns along the midline. It is uniform yellowish brown above, becoming grayish on the tail past the stinging spine, and white below; there is apparently a spotted color variant that had previously been described as a different species, the dragon stingray (H. draco).

Preying mainly on small bony fishes and crustaceans, the Jenkins' whipray is commonly found in inshore, sandy or silty habitats shallower than 50 m (160 ft). It is aplacental viviparous, with the females nourishing their developing young with histotroph ("uterine milk"). This species is regularly caught by coastal fisheries across much of its range, particularly in the Arafura Sea; its skin is highly valued for the large thorns, while the meat and cartilage may also be marketed. The International Union for Conservation of Nature (IUCN) has listed the Jenkins' whipray under Vulnerable, noting that it faces minimal conservation threats off northern Australia, which encompasses a large portion of its range. However, there is intense fishing pressure in Southeast Asia and has led to significant population declines there.

== Taxonomy ==
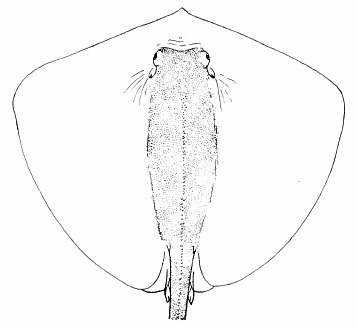
The illustration that accompanied Annandale's 1909 description.

The first known specimens of the Jenkins' whipray were two 1.0 m (3.3 ft) wide adult males collected near Ganjam, India by the steamer Golden Crown, and described by Scottish zoologist Nelson Annandale in a 1909 issue of Memoirs of the Indian Museum. He named the new species Trygon jenkinsii, in honor of Dr. J. Travis Jenkins, the Scientific Advisor on Fisheries to the Government of Bengal, who assisted the Golden Crown expedition. Other common names for this ray include brown stingray, golden whip ray, pointed-nose stingray, rough-back stingray, and sharpnose stingray.

The Jenkins' whipray is easily confused for the pink whipray (H. fai), and has likely been misrepresented as that species in various publications. In 2004, Mabel Manjaji grouped it with H. fai, H. gerrardi, H. leoparda, H. toshi, H. uarnak, and H. undulata in the 'uarnak' species complex. The dragon stingray (H. draco), described from South Africa in 1984, closely resembles the Jenkins' whipray but has dark spots along the posterior margin of the disc. Similarly spotted rays have since been documented from the Arafura Sea, Sulu Sea, Sumatra, and western Sri Lanka, leading taxonomists to tentatively re-classify H. draco as a color morph of H. jenkinsii.

== Description ==
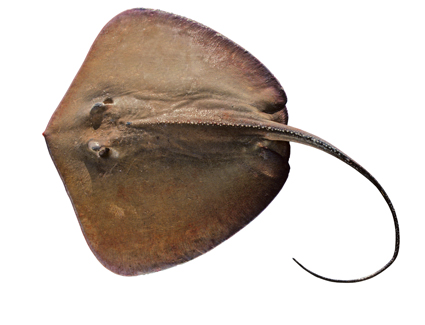
The Jenkins' whipray is typically plain yellowish brown in color, with a white disc margin and a darker tail.

The pectoral fin disc of the Jenkins' whipray is diamond-shaped and rather thick in the center, measuring 1.1–1.2 times wider than long; the outer corners of the disc are broadly rounded. The anterior margins of the disc are nearly straight and converge at a very obtuse angle on the snout, which has a barely protruding tip. The eyes are medium-sized and closely followed by larger spiracles. A short, broad curtain of skin with a finely fringed posterior margin is present between the long, thin nostrils. The mouth is wide and gently arched, and contains four papillae (nipple-shaped structures) on the floor, the inner pair of which is shorter than the outer.

The pelvic fins are small and narrow. The cylindrical, tapering tail lacks fin folds and measures slightly longer than the disc width. One to three serrated, stinging spines are located atop the tail, approximately one-quarter of the total tail length back from the base. The upper surface of the disc has a granular texture and bears a broad central band of closely spaced, flattened heart-shaped dermal denticles, beginning between the eyes, becoming widest at the "shoulders", and extending to entirely cover the tail. One or more rows of large, spear-like thorns also run along the dorsal midline from the center of the disc to the base of the sting. Barring the possible spotted variant, this species is a uniform yellowish brown above, with the disc margin and underside white, and the tail gray past the sting. It can grow up to 1.5 m (4.9 ft) across and 3.0 m (9.8 ft) long.

== Distribution and habitat ==
The Jenkins' whipray is rather common, with a wide but patchy distributed in the tropical waters of the Indo-Pacific. It occurs off southeastern Africa (including Madagascar), the Socotra Islands near Yemen, South and Southeast Asia (including the Philippines), New Guinea, and northern Australia from Ningaloo Reef to the Gulf of Carpentaria. This bottom-dwelling species is generally found close to shore in water under 50 m (160 ft) deep, though it has been recorded as far down as 100 m (330 ft) off northwestern Australia. It prefers sandy or silty bottoms, often in lagoons, and has been known to enter brackish water.

== Biology and ecology ==
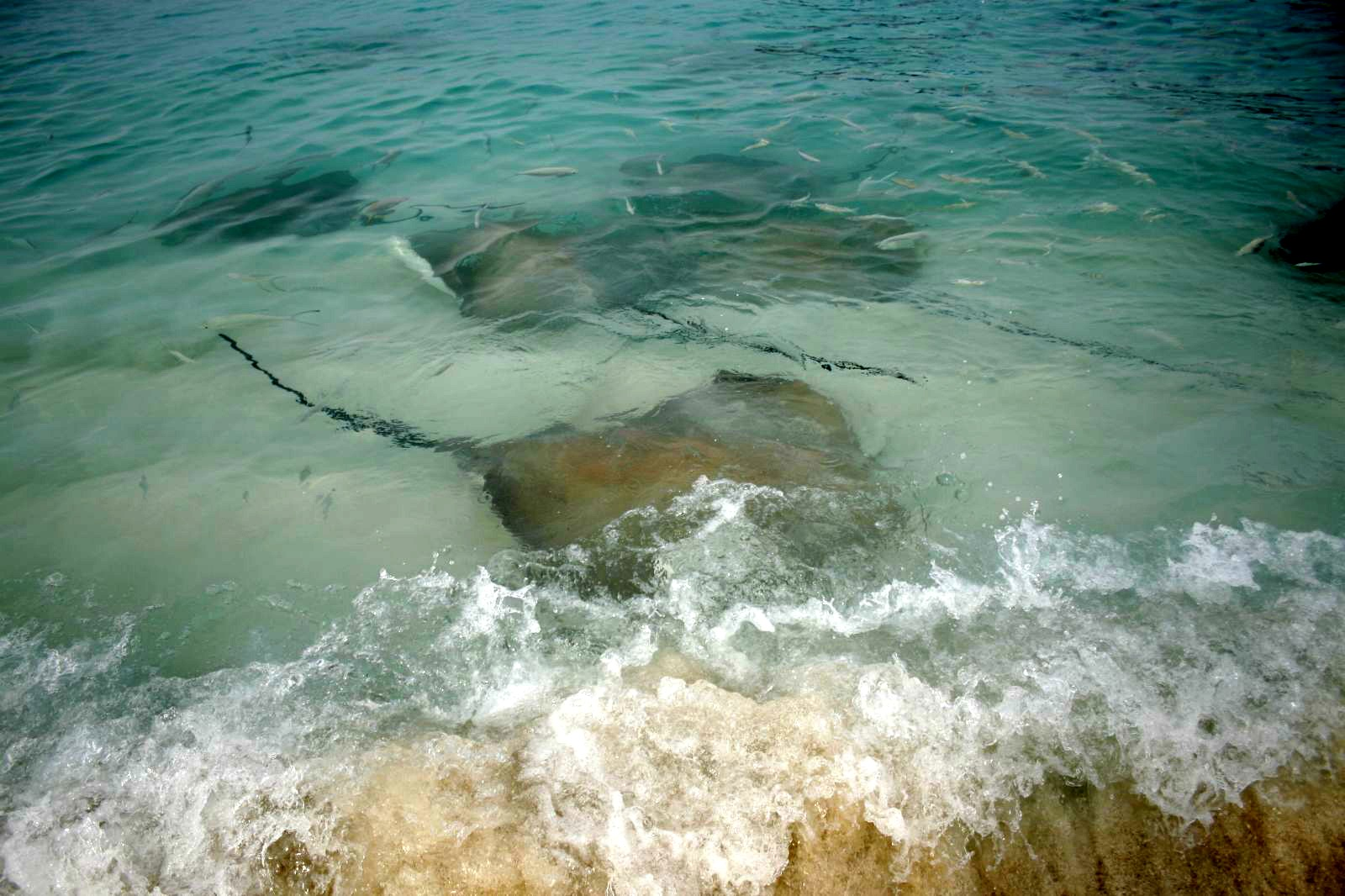
Jenkins' whiprays off a beach in the Maldives; this ray sometimes forms groups.

The Jenkins' whipray may be encountered alone or in groups; there is some evidence of segregation by sex. Small teleost fishes form a substantial portion of its diet, while crustaceans are also taken. One individual has been observed accompanying a smalleye stingray (Dasyatis microps) off Tofo, Mozambique. Known parasites of this species include the tapeworms Dollfusiella ocallaghani, Parachristianella baverstocki, P. indonesiensis, and Pterobothrium platycephalum. As in other stingrays, the Jenkins' whipray is aplacental viviparous: the developing embryos are sustained at first by yolk, which is later supplanted by histotroph ("uterine milk") produced by the mother. The newborns measure 20–27 cm (7.9–10.6 in) across, and males reach sexual maturity at 75–85 cm (30–33 in) across.

== Human interactions ==
Because of its large thorns, the Jenkins' whipray is highly prized for its skin; the meat and cartilage may also be utilized. It is frequently taken intentionally and incidentally across much of its range by intensive coastal fisheries, using tangle nets, bottom trawls, seine nets, and to a lesser extent longlines. Particularly large numbers are caught by an Indonesian commercial gillnet fishery targeting wedgefishes, that operates in the Arafura Sea and increasingly, illegally, in Australian waters. Although species-specific data is lacking, this fishery has caused a substantial decline in overall stingray populations. Off northern Australia, the Jenkins' whipray is relatively protected; it is thought to contribute minimally to the bycatch of the Northern Prawn Fishery (NPF) since the mandatory introduction of Turtle Excluder Devices (TERs). The International Union for Conservation of Nature (IUCN) has assessed this species as of Vulnerable globally due to the intensity and inadequate regulation of regional fishing activities in Southeast Asia.
