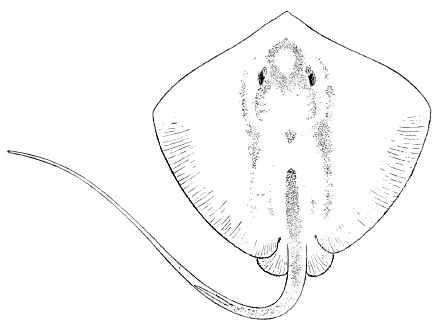
- Annandale's 1909 illustration of Himantura alcockii

Scientific classification
- Kingdom: Animalia
- Phylum: Chordata
- Class: Chondrichthyes
- Subclass: Elasmobranchii
- Order: Myliobatiformes
- Family: Dasyatidae
- Genus: Himantura
- Species: H. alcockii

Binomial name
- Himantura alcockii (Annandale, 1909)

Synonyms
- Dasyatis alcockii (Annandale, 1909); Himantura alcocki (Annandale, 1909); Trygon alcockii Annandale, 1909

= Himantura alcockii =

Species of cartilaginous fish

Himantura alcockii, the pale-spot whip ray, is a species of stingray in the family Dasyatidae. It is found in coastal regions including estuaries, in the Indian Ocean. As presently defined, it is probably a species complex.

== Taxonomy ==
The species has had a chequered taxonomic history. The IUCN Red List still lists H. alcockii as a synonym of the Whitespotted whipray, which is now reallocated to Maculabatis.

== Human interactions ==
Over 50% of the total ray catch landed at Mumbai consists of this species.
