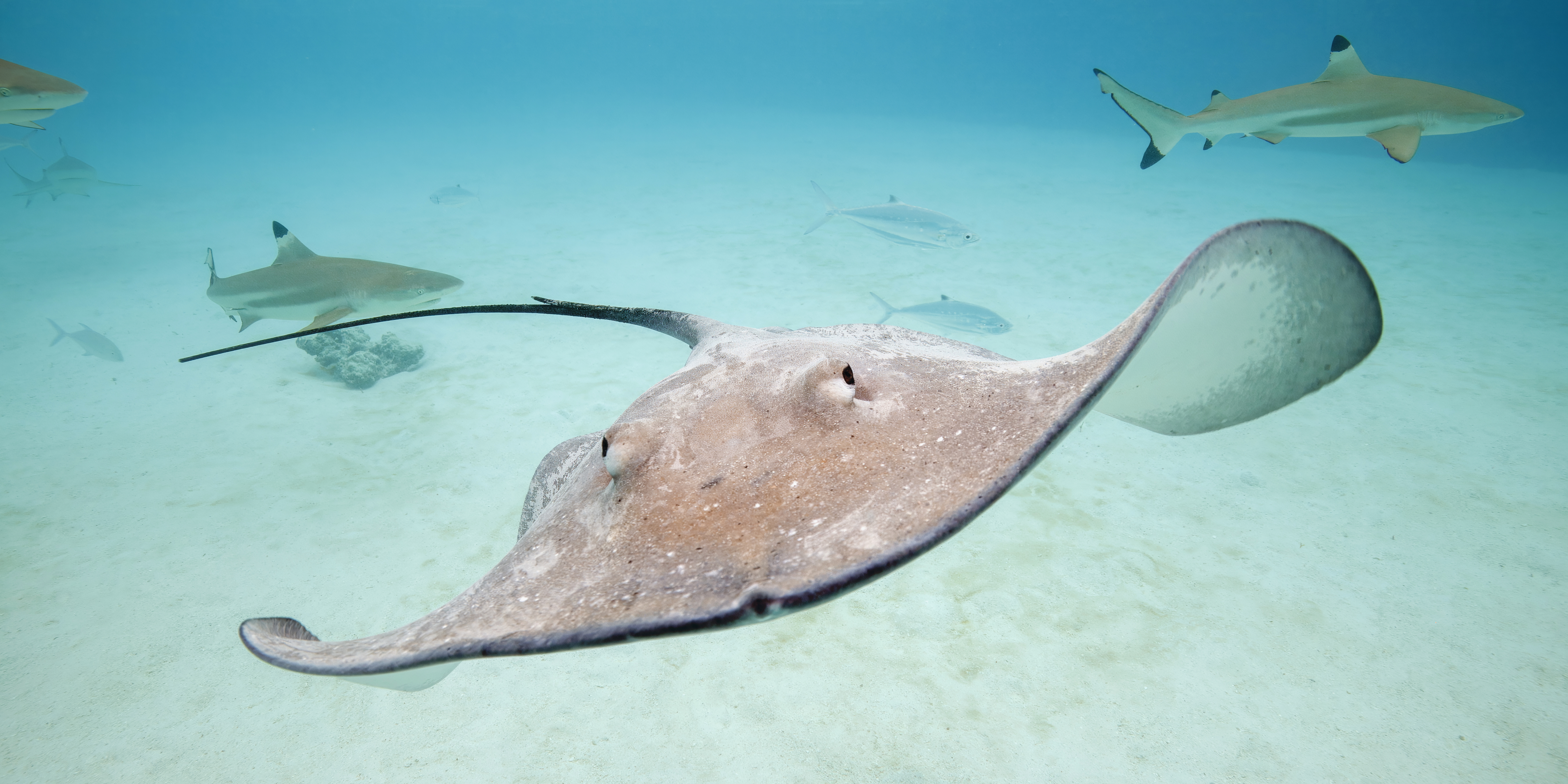
- Moorea, French Polynesia

Conservation status
- Vulnerable (IUCN 3.1)

Scientific classification
- Kingdom: Animalia
- Phylum: Chordata
- Class: Chondrichthyes
- Subclass: Elasmobranchii
- Order: Myliobatiformes
- Family: Dasyatidae
- Genus: Pateobatis
- Species: P. fai

Binomial name
- Pateobatis fai D. S. Jordan & Seale, 1906
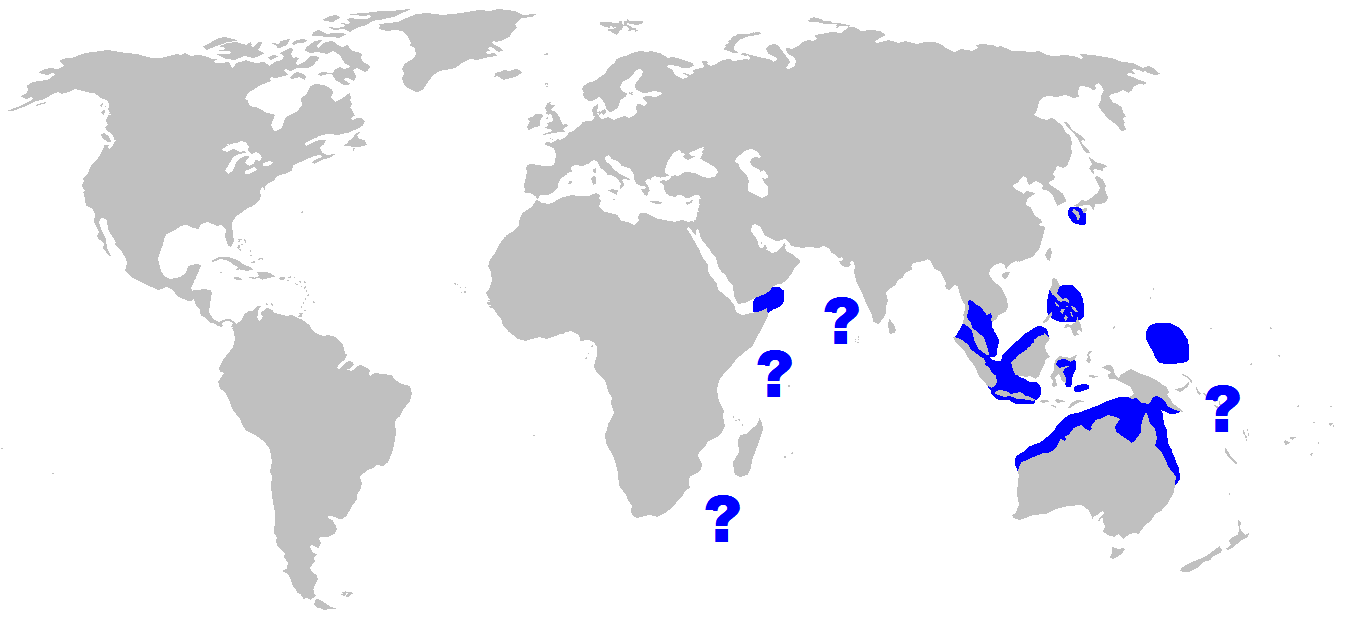
- Range of the pink whipray

Synonyms
- Himantura fai

= Pink whipray =

Species of stingray (fish)

The pink whipray (Pateobatis fai) is a species of stingray in the family Dasyatidae, with a wide but ill-defined distribution in the tropical Indo-Pacific from southern Africa to Polynesia. It is a bottom dweller that generally inhabits shallow water under 70 m (230 ft) deep, in sandy areas associated with coral reefs. Individuals exhibit a high degree of fidelity to particular locations. The pink whipray has a diamond-shaped pectoral fin disc wider than long, with a broad-angled snout and a very long, whip-like tail without fin folds. It has only a few small thorns on its back and is uniform brownish to grayish pink in color, becoming much darker past the tail sting. This large ray can reach 1.8 m (5.9 ft) across and over 5 m (16 ft) long.

Gregarious in nature, the pink whipray has been known to form large active and resting aggregations, and associate with other large ray species. It preys mainly on prawns, but also consumes other benthic invertebrates and bony fishes. This species is aplacental viviparous, in which the unborn young are nourished by histotroph ("uterine milk") produced by the mother. Across much of its range, substantial numbers of pink whiprays are caught incidentally by a variety of fishing gear and marketed for meat, skin, and cartilage. It is also of importance to ecotourism, being attracted to visitors with bait. In 2009, the International Union for Conservation of Nature (IUCN) had listed this species as Least Concern, due to its wide distribution that includes relatively protected areas, such as northern Australia. However, its population is likely declining under heavy fishing pressure, and since 2016 has been assessed as Vulnerable.

== Taxonomy ==
The pink whipway was described by American ichthyologists David Starr Jordan and Alvin Seale in the 1906 volume of Bulletin of the Bureau of Fisheries, on the basis of a specimen 37 cm (15 in) across collected off Apia, Samoa. The specific epithet fai means "stingray" in the native languages of Samoa, Tonga, Futuna, and Tahiti. Another common name for this species is Tahitian stingray. In 2004, Mabel Manjaji grouped H. fai with H. gerrardi, H. jenkinsii, H. leoparda, H. toshi, H. uarnak, and H. undulata in the uarnak species complex.

== Description ==
The pectoral fin disc of the pink whipray is diamond-shaped and thick at the center, measuring about 1.1–1.2 times wider than long. The outer corners of the disc are angular. The snout forms a very obtuse angle, with the tip barely protruding. The small, widely spaced eyes are followed by larger spiracles. There is a short and broad curtain of skin with a finely fringed posterior margin between the long, thin nostrils. The mouth is fairly small and surrounded by prominent furrows; the lower jaw has a small indentation in the middle. There are two large central and two tiny lateral papillae on the floor of the mouth. The teeth are small and arranged into pavement-like surfaces. Five pairs of gill slits are located beneath the disc. The pelvic fins are small and narrow.

The tail is extremely long and thin, measuring at least twice the disc length when intact. It lacks fin folds and usually bears a single serrated stinging spine. Adults have small, rounded dermal denticles covering the central dorsal surface of the disc, beginning in front of the eyes and extending to cover the entire tail; there are also small, sharp thorns on the midline, which become densest at the base of the tail. Juveniles are either smooth-skinned or have a sparser covering of flat, heart-shaped denticles. This species is uniform grayish to brownish pink above, becoming dark gray to black on the tail past the sting, and uniformly light below. It grows to at least 1.8 m (5.9 ft) across and over 5 m (16 ft) long. Its maximum weight on record is 19 kg (42 lb).

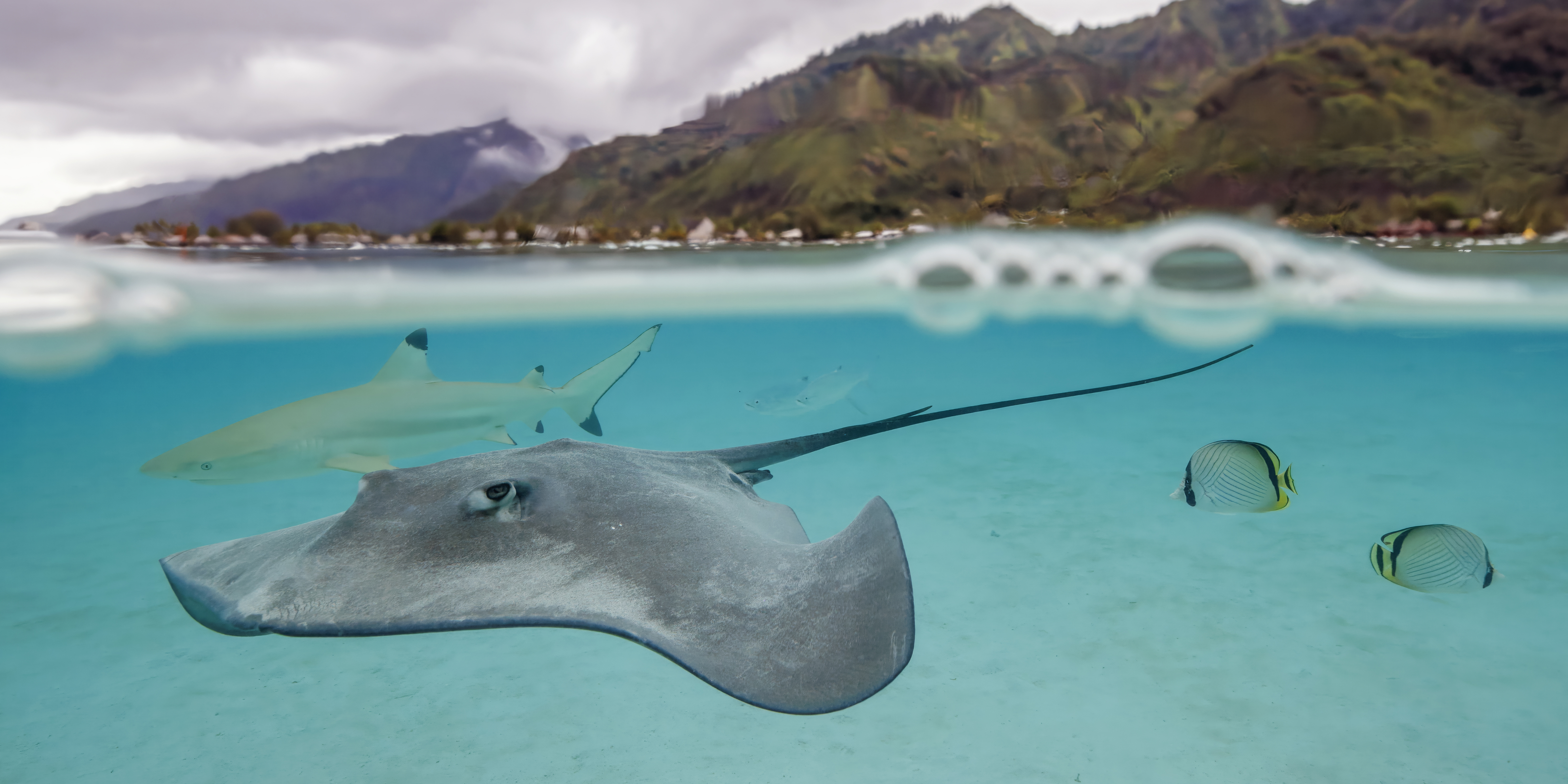

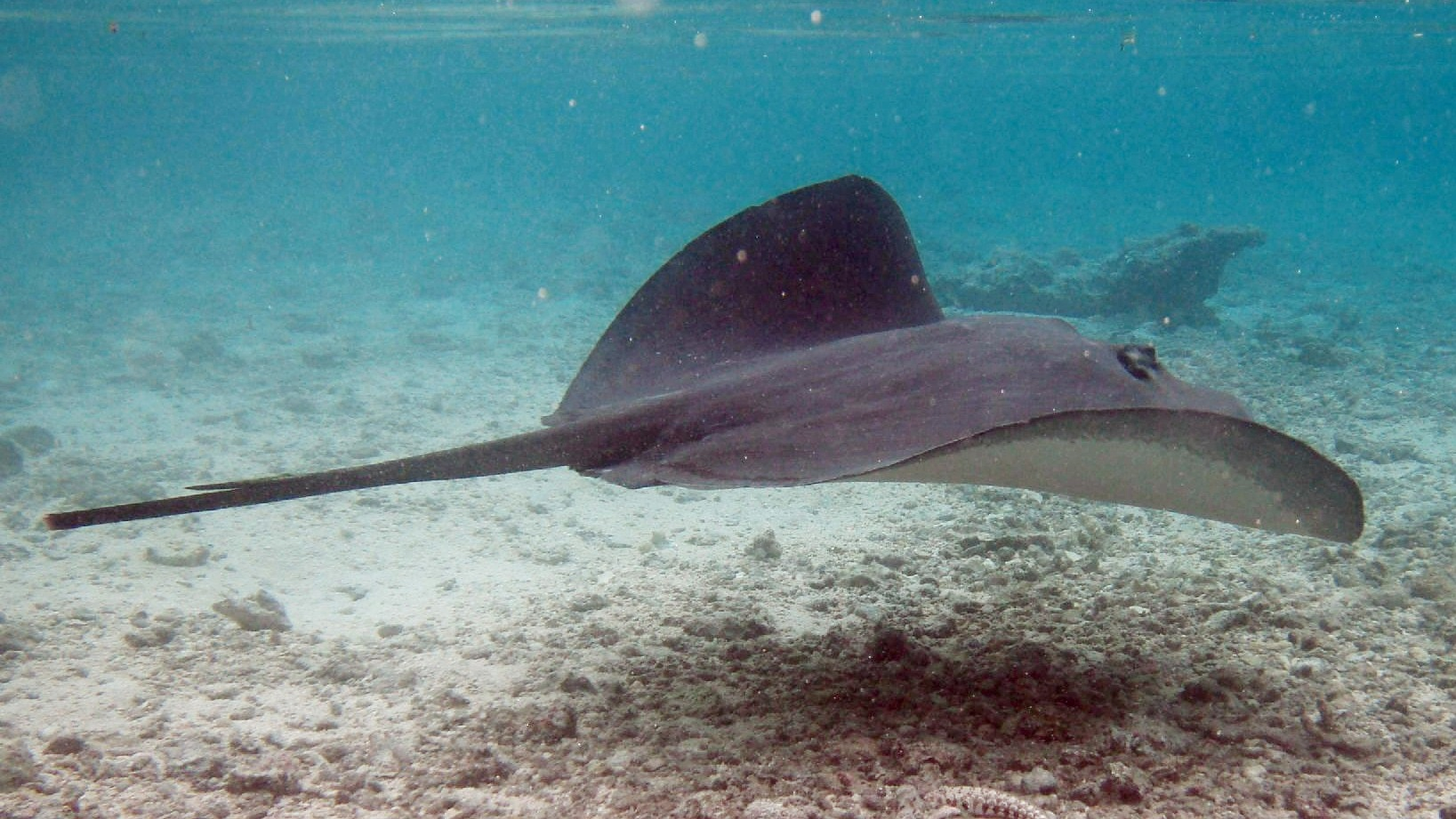
The uniform grayish dorsal coloration darkens past the sting.

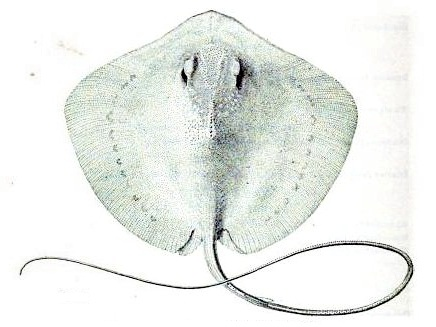
The illustration that accompanied Jordan and Seale's 1906 description

== Distribution and habitat ==
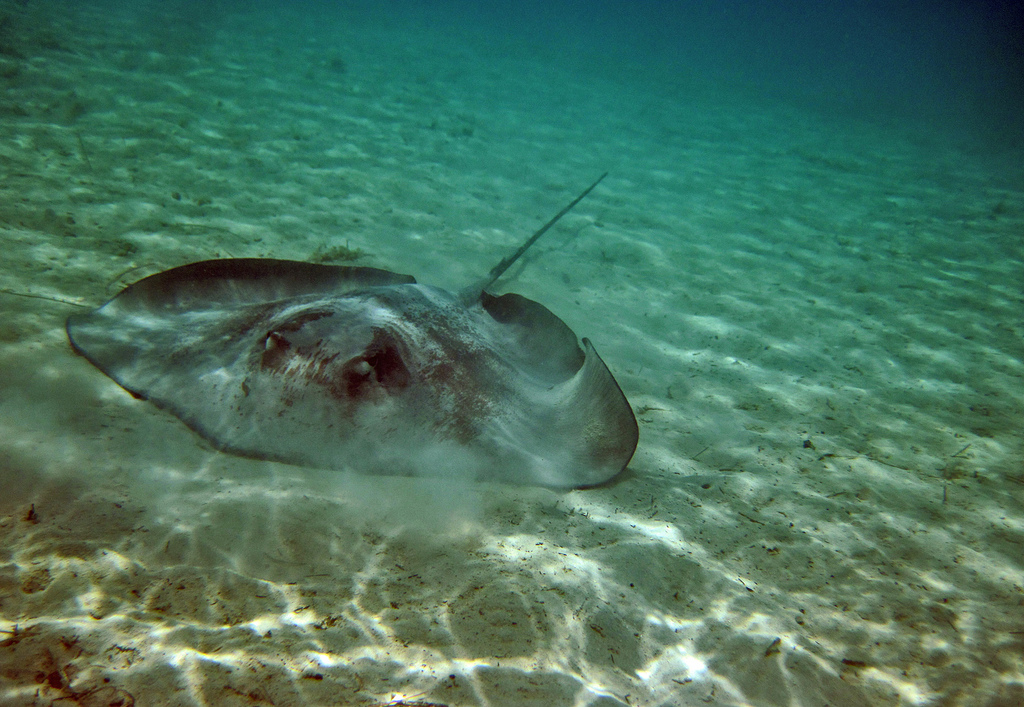
The pink whipray frequents shallow, sandy habitats.

The exact range of the pink whipray is unclear due to confusion with the Jenkins' whipray (H. jenkinsii). It is believed to be common throughout the tropical waters of the Indo-Pacific, probably occurring all around Indian Ocean periphery from South Africa to northern Australia, from the year 2014 appears in the Red Sea. Its range extends to the Pacific Ocean, northward to the Philippines, the Ryukyu Islands, and Iriomote, and eastward to various islands including Micronesia, the Marquesas Islands, and Samoa.

The pink whipray has been recorded from as deep as 200 m (660 ft), but is usually found from the intertidal zone to a depth of 70 m (230 ft). This bottom-dwelling species prefers sandy flats, lagoons, and other soft-bottomed habitats, often near cays and atolls in coral reefs. It tends to be found closer to shore during the warm season. Genetic and telemetry studies across Polynesian islands have found that individual rays tend to remain within a local area, with very little between-island movement.

== Biology and ecology ==
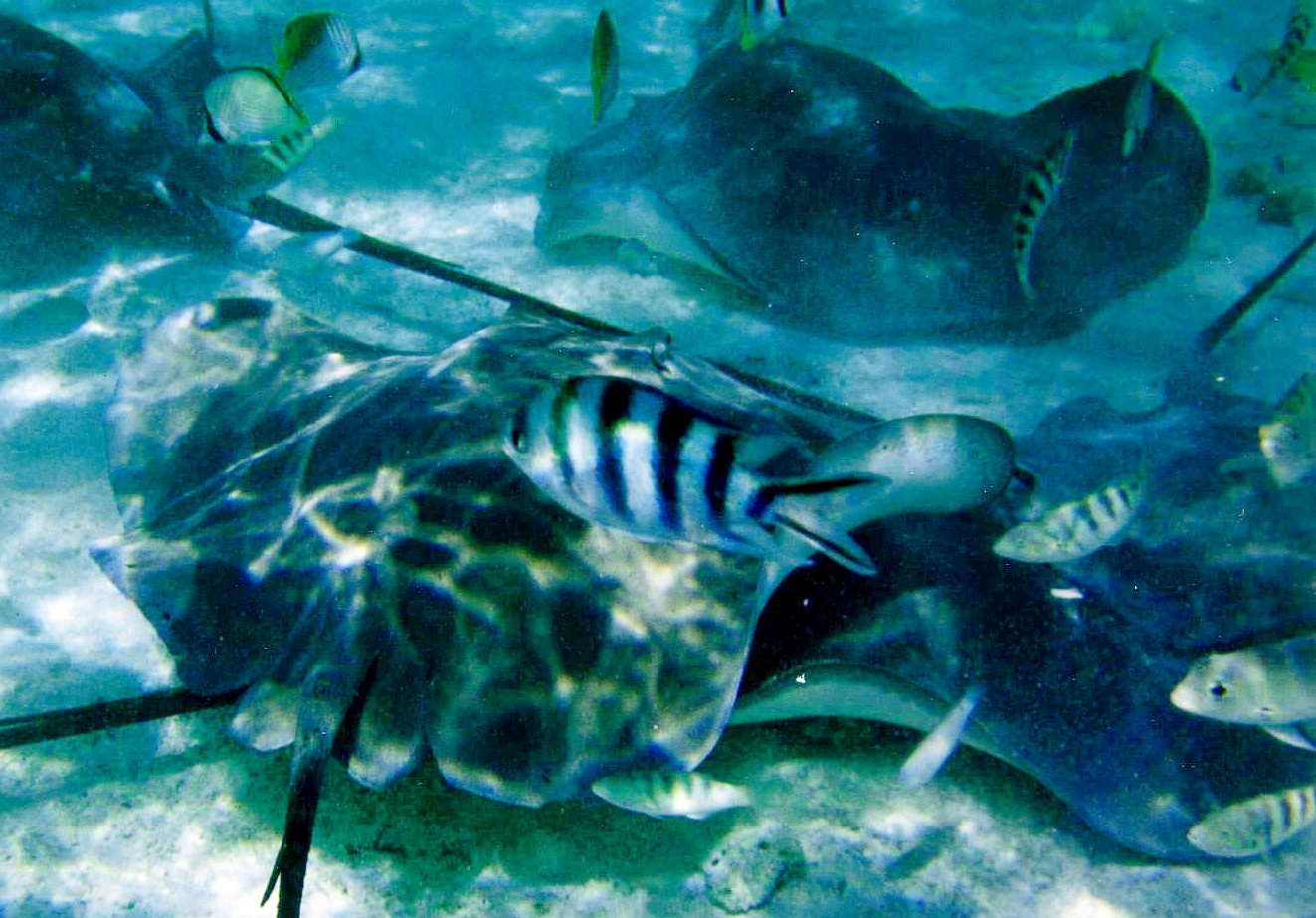
Pink whiprays often form groups for natural and artificial reasons.

Small to large gatherings of pink whiprays have been observed over sandy flats and coral reefs in Shark Bay, on the Great Barrier Reef, and in the Caroline Islands. When resting, up to ten individuals may pile atop one another, sometimes mixing with other species. On Ningaloo Reef, it has been seen "riding" on larger species of rays. The pink whipray feeds primarily on decapod crustaceans, but also takes cephalopods, and teleost fishes. In Shark Bay, penaeid prawns are by far the dominant prey type for rays of all sizes. At Rangiroa Atoll in French Polynesia, sizable feeding aggregations are known to form at night in shallow water. However, at Moorea it tends to be a solitary forager with a large home range.

Like other stingrays, the pink whipray is aplacental viviparous, with the mother supplying her developing embryos with nutrient-rich histotroph ("uterine milk") through specialized uterine structures. The newborns measure 55–60 cm (22–24 in) across. Shark Bay may be a nursery area for this species. Males reach sexual maturity at 1.1–1.2 m (3.6–3.9 ft) across, while the maturation size for females is unknown. Known parasites of the pink whipray include the monogeneans Heterocotyle capricornensis, Monocotyle helicophallus, M. spiremae, M. youngi, Merizocotyle australensis, Neoentobdella parvitesticulata, and Trimusculotrema heronensis, the tapeworm Prochristianella spinulifera, and the isopod Gnathia grandilaris.

== Human interactions ==
Though not highly dangerous to humans, the pink whipray's venomous sting makes it difficult to handle when it is thrashing in a fishing net. Usually, it must be thrown overboard before the rest of the catch can be sorted. Throughout Indonesia and Malaysia, and probably elsewhere in its range, this species is a regular incidental catch of coastal fisheries using tangle nets, bottom trawls, gillnets, seine nets, and to a lesser extent longlines. When retained, the meat, skin, and cartilage are utilized. Fishing activity in Southeast Asia is intense and largely unregulated, and this large ray may be more vulnerable to depletion than its smaller relatives because of its slower reproductive rate. The population in the Arafura Sea is thought to have been particularly affected by an Indonesian fishery targeting wedgefishes (Rhynchobatus), and Indonesian fishers are also increasingly operating illegally in Australian waters. Off northern Australia, the pink whipray is caught incidentally by the Northern Prawn Fishery (NPF), but bycatch levels have likely fallen significantly since the use of turtle excluder devices (TEDs) and bycatch reduction devices (BRDs) became compulsory in 2000.

The pink whipray is valuable to ecotourism at sites in the Maldives, French Polynesia, and elsewhere; they are attracted to visitors in large numbers by the promise of food. The government of the Maldives has taken steps to preserve ray ecotourism by banning all exports of ray products in 1995. In 2005, stingray ecotourism at Moorea brought in over €500,000. However, a 2008 study of Moorea whiprays found a negative effect of ecotourism in the form of bite and impact injuries, stemming from artificially high ray density and interactions with boat traffic at the feeding sites. The International Union for Conservation of Nature (IUCN) has assessed the pink whipray as Vulnerable overall. Although the species has a wide distribution that includes refuge regions with few conservation threats such as the population off northern Australia. By contrast the Southeast Asian population is heavily fished.
