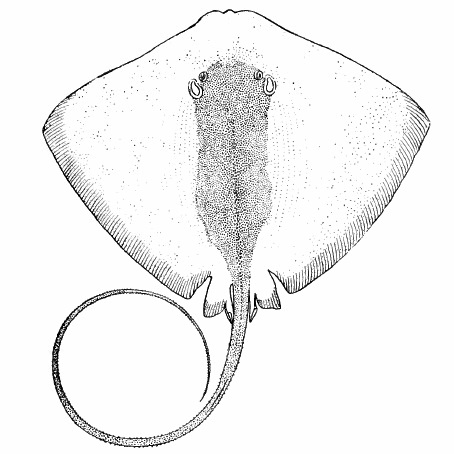

Conservation status
- Data Deficient (IUCN 3.1)

Scientific classification
- Kingdom: Animalia
- Phylum: Chordata
- Class: Chondrichthyes
- Subclass: Elasmobranchii
- Order: Myliobatiformes
- Family: Dasyatidae
- Genus: Himantura
- Species: H. marginata

Binomial name
- Himantura marginata (Blyth, 1860)

Synonyms
- Trygon marginatus Blyth, 1860

= Blackedge whipray =

Species of cartilaginous fish

The blackedge whipray (Himantura marginata) is a little-known species of stingray in the family Dasyatidae, found in the coastal waters of the Bay of Bengal and the Gulf of Mannar. Attaining a disc width of 1.8 m (5.9 ft), this species has a diamond-shaped disc with two small concavities on either side of the snout tip, and a long, whip-like tail without tail folds. It is characterized by large thorns with star-shaped bases scattered over the disc, and by the wide, black marginal bands on the underside of the disc. The International Union for Conservation of Nature (IUCN) currently lacks sufficient data to assess the blackedge whipray beyond Data Deficient.

== Taxonomy ==
English zoologist Edward Blyth described the blackedge stingray as Trygon marginatus, in an 1860 issue of the Journal and Proceedings of the Asiatic Society of Bengal. Blyth based his account on a specimen 1.2 m (3.9 ft) across obtained from a fish market in Calcutta, which has since been lost. The specific epithet marginatus means "enclosed with a border" in Latin. Subsequent authors have placed this species in the genus Himantura.

== Distribution and habitat ==
The blackedge whipray is found off Myanmar, Bengal and Ganjam in India, and in the Gulf of Mannar. Its range may extend as far as Indonesia and Mozambique. It is fairly rare compared to other stingrays that share its range. This bottom-dwelling species inhabits coastal waters to at least a depth of 44 m (144 ft), and sometimes enters brackish water.

== Description ==
The pectoral fin disc of the blackedge whipray is diamond-shaped, wider than long, and thick at the center. The outer corners are narrowly rounded and the leading margins converge at an obtuse angle. The tip of the snout projects slightly, and is flanked by a pair of small, shallow concavities. The eyes are small and followed by larger spiracles. There is a curtain of skin between the nostrils. The mouth is small and bow-shaped, with a papilla (nipple-like structure) near each corner. The numerous teeth are arranged with a quincunx pattern; each has an oval to rhomboid base, with a prominent central ridge and low ridges alongside. The pelvic fins extend past the disc.

The tail is much longer than the disc and bears a serrated stinging spine on top, about one disc length back from the base. The base of the tail is flattened, tapering to become whip-like past the sting; there are no fin folds. The dorsal surface of the disc is densely covered by granules that become smaller towards the disc margin, starting in front of the disc and reaching the base of the tail. Large thorns with star-shaped bases are found in a row along the midline of the back, as well as scattered over the rest of the disc; these thorns resemble small limpets or salt crystals, hence the ray's Tamil name uppan thirukai ("salt-like ray"). The tail is smooth up to the spine, and beyond is entirely covered by small granules and prickles. The center of the disc is dark brown or gray above, becoming darker or light violet towards the margins, and sometimes with a posterior yellow area reaching the base of the sting. There may be small yellowish spots scattered over the disc, or a bluish irregular line running around the disc a small distance from the edge. The underside is white with a wide, black, irregularly edged band running along the lateral and posterior disc margins. The tail is brown at the base and white past the sting. This large species grows to 1.8 m (5.9 ft) across and 3.5 m (11 ft) long.

== Biology and ecology ==
Virtually nothing is known of the natural history of the blackedge whipray. It is presumably aplacental viviparous like other members of its family. A known parasite of this species is the tapeworm Acanthobothrium dighaensis.

== Human interactions ==
The blackedge whipray is occasionally caught by artisanal and commercial fisheries. The International Union for Conservation of Nature does not yet have enough information to assess this species beyond Data Deficient.
