= Smalleye whip ray =

Scientific classification
- Kingdom: Animalia
- Phylum: Chordata
- Class: Chondrichthyes
- Subclass: Elasmobranchii
- Order: Myliobatiformes
- Family: Dasyatidae
- Genus: Himantura
- Species: H. microphthalma

Binomial name
- Himantura microphthalma (J. S. T. F. Chen, 1948)

Synonyms
- Dasyatis microphthalmus J. S. T. F. Chen, 1948

Species of cartilaginous fish

The smalleye whip ray (Himantura microphthalma) is an obscure species of stingray in the family Dasyatidae. It is known only from a single specimen collected off Taiwan and assigned to the genus Dasyatis by J.T.F. Chen in 1948. In 1982, Leonard Compagno and Tyson Roberts moved it to the genus Himantura based on its apparent lack of a tail fold. In 2006, B. Mabel Manjaji-Matsumoto and Peter Last determined that the type specimen had been lost since Chen's description and that no further specimens have emerged since. Therefore, they considered this species to be a nomen dubium, perhaps conspecific with Dasyatis acutirostra.
