= Himantura krempfi =

Scientific classification
- Kingdom: Animalia
- Phylum: Chordata
- Class: Chondrichthyes
- Subclass: Elasmobranchii
- Order: Myliobatiformes
- Family: Dasyatidae
- Genus: Himantura
- Species: H. krempfi

Binomial name
- Himantura krempfi (Chabanaud, 1923)

Synonyms
- Dasyatis krempfi (Chabanaud, 1923); Dasybatus krempfi Chabanaud, 1923

Species of cartilaginous fish

Himantura krempfi, the marbled freshwater whip ray, is a species of stingray in the family Dasyatidae. It is found in freshwater rivers, such as the Chao Phraya and Mekong basins, in Asia.

== Taxonomy ==
The species has had a chequered taxonomic history. The IUCN Red List still lists H. krempfi as a synonym of the Marbled whipray, which is now reallocated to Fluvitrygon.
