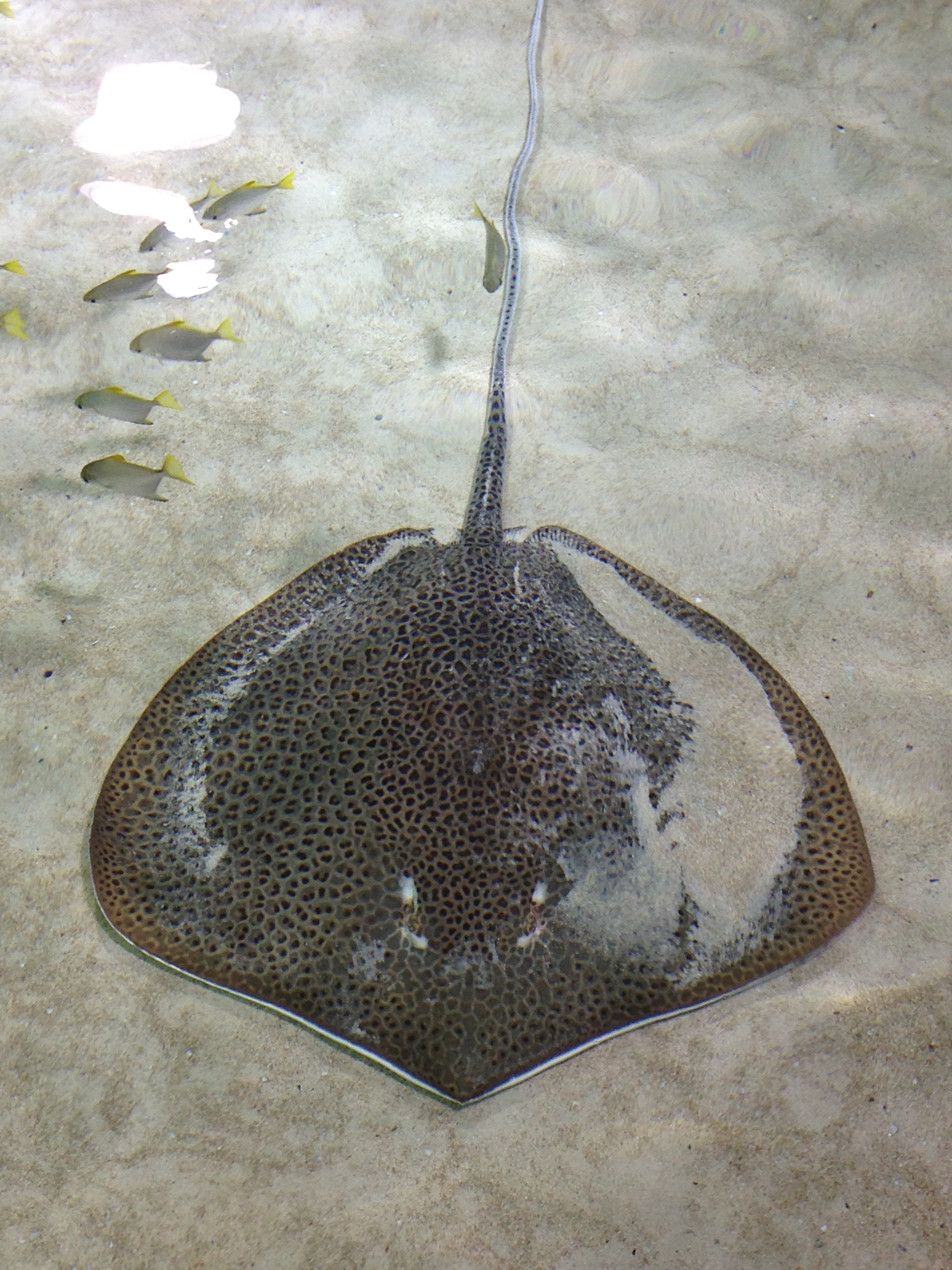

Conservation status
- Endangered (IUCN 3.1)

Scientific classification
- Kingdom: Animalia
- Phylum: Chordata
- Class: Chondrichthyes
- Subclass: Elasmobranchii
- Order: Myliobatiformes
- Family: Dasyatidae
- Genus: Himantura
- Species: H. uarnak

Binomial name
- Himantura uarnak (Forsskål, 1775) or (J. F. Gmelin, 1789)
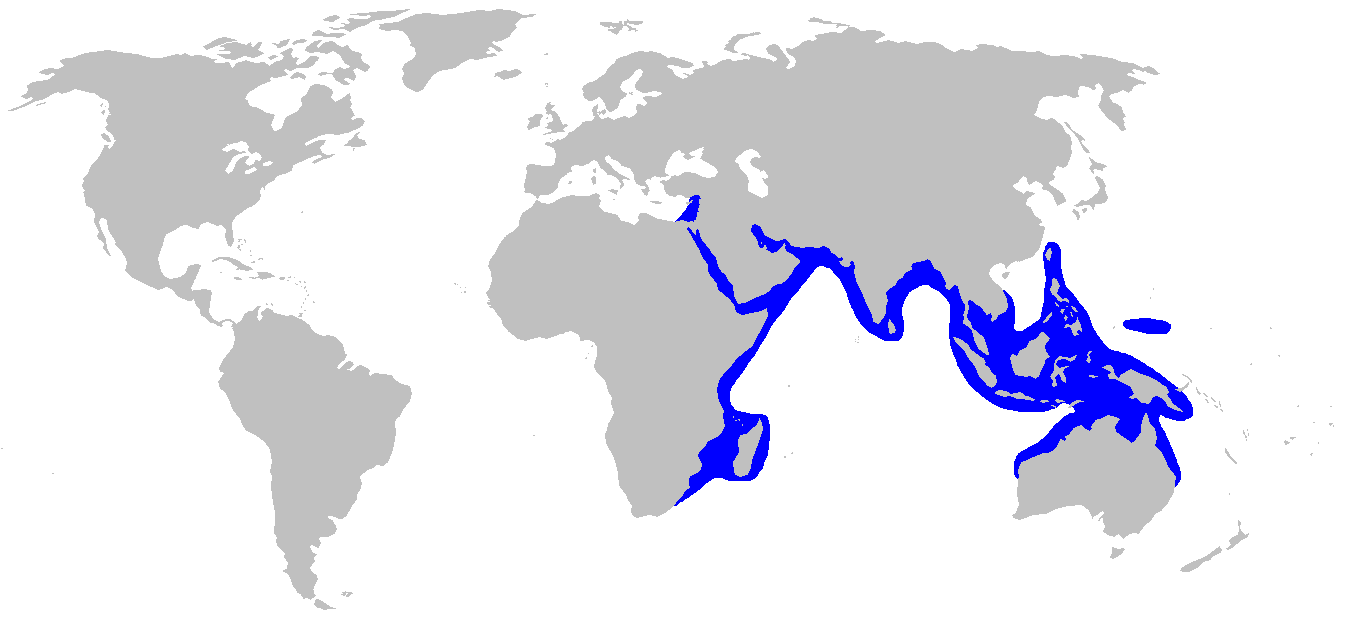
- Range of the reticulate whipray

Synonyms
- Dasyatis uarnak Gmelin, 1789; Raia scherit Bonnaterre, 1788; Raja uarnak Gmelin, 1789; Raja sephen var. uarnak Forsskål, 1775; Raja uarnata Walbaum, 1792; Trygon maculata Kuhl & van Hasselt in Bleeker, 1852; Trygon punctata Günther, 1870

= Reticulate whipray =

Species of fish

The reticulate whipray or honeycomb stingray (Himantura uarnak) is a species of stingray in the family Dasyatidae. It inhabits coastal waters in the western Indian Ocean including the Red Sea, Natal and the Arabian Sea; also a Lessepsian transmigrant in the eastern Mediterranean. A large species reaching 2 m (6.6 ft) in width, the reticulate whipray has a diamond-shaped pectoral fin disc and an extremely long tail without fin folds. Both its common and scientific names refer to its ornate dorsal color pattern of many small, close-set dark spots or reticulations on a lighter background. However, the reticulate whipray is only one of several large spotted stingrays in the Indo-Pacific which, coupled with the variability of its coloration with age and locality, has resulted in a great deal of taxonomic confusion.

Often encountered resting on the bottom during daytime, the reticulate whipray is a predator of bottom-dwelling invertebrates and bony fishes. Like other stingrays, it is aplacental viviparous, with the developing embryos nourished at first by yolk and later by histotroph ("uterine milk"). Females bear litters of up to five pups in summer, following a gestation period of a year. The reticulate whipray is fished in parts of the Indian Ocean for meat, skin, cartilage, and other purposes. It is highly susceptible to population depletion because of its large size, inshore habits, and low reproductive rate, and is additionally threatened by extensive habitat degradation. Consequently, the International Union for Conservation of Nature (IUCN) has assessed this species as Endangered.

== Taxonomy and phylogeny ==
In 1775, Carsten Niebuhr published Descriptiones animalium – avium, amphibiorum, piscium, insectorum, vermium: quæ in itinere orientali observavit, the work of his late friend, the Swedish naturalist Peter Forsskål. Under what Forsskål had described as Raja sephen, now commonly known as the cowtail stingray, was a spotted variant he called uarnak ورنك, which is the Arabic name of stingrays on the Red Sea shores. No type specimen was then designated. Forsskål's account formed the basis for two subsequent writings that named the spotted ray as a distinct species: Pierre Joseph Bonnaterre's Raia scherit in 1788, and Johann Friedrich Gmelin's Raja uarnak in 1789. Although Bonnaterre's name was published first and thus would have had precedence, later authorities have regarded Forsskål's uarnak as the earliest available name even though it was not initially part of a binomial. Consequently, modern sources give uarnak as the valid specific epithet and either Gmelin or Forsskål as the species authority. In 1837, Johannes Peter Müller and Friedrich Gustav Jakob Henle included the reticulate whipray in the newly created genus Himantura; David Starr Jordan and Barton Warren Evermann made it the type species in 1896. In the absence of an original type specimen, a neotype from the Jeddah region in the Red Sea was designated along with the diagnostic features that definitely enable researchers to distinguish Himantura uarnak from its close relatives.

The reticulate whipray is closely related to H. undulata, H. leoparda as well as the recently described H. tutul (previously confused with H. leoparda) and H. australis. All five species are very similar in size and shape, and their colour patterns may overlap to some extent, resulting in a long history of taxonomic confusion that only recently has begun to be untangled. In 2004, Mabel Manjaji designated as the 'uarnak' species complex a group of genetically unrelated species including H. fai, H. gerrardi, H. jenkinsii, H. leoparda, H. toshi, H. uarnak, and H. undulata, plus three more undescribed species. While species within this complex may reside in overlapping geographical ranges and habitats, hybridization between species is at most a very rare occurrence. The best approach for identifying individuals within this complex has been advised for use of the universal COI barcode.

More recently, genera in the stingray family Dasyatidae were redefined based on molecular phylogenetics. Species previously under Himantura now belong to separate genera. The reticulate whipray itself varies in appearance throughout its range, and further taxonomic comparisons are required to determine whether its spotted and reticulated color morphs in fact represent different species. Alternate common names for this ray include the honeycomb ray, coachwhip ray, leopard stingray, longtail stingray, and marbled stingray; some of these names are shared by other, similar species.

== Description ==
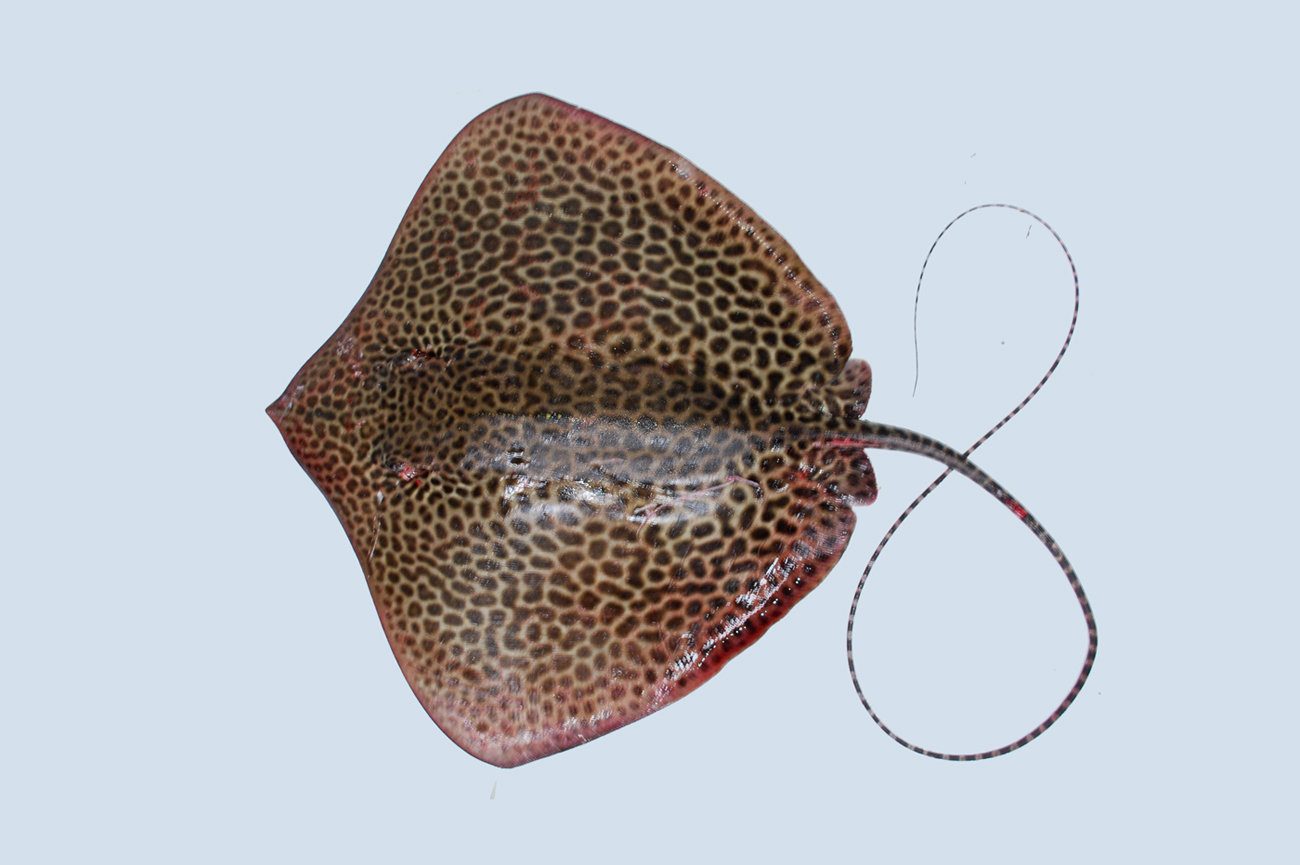
The reticulate whipray has a dorsal color pattern of many small dark spots.

The pectoral fin disc of the reticulate whipray is diamond-shaped and wider than long, with the leading margins almost straight and the snout and outer corners quadrangular. The pectoral fin apex is narrowly rounded with the anterior margin almost straight. In juveniles, the disc is about as wide as long, with a more obtuse snout and rounded corners.

The eyes are small and have a small interorbital diameter. Immediately following the eyes lie the spiracles which are paired respiratory openings. A short and wide curtain of skin with a minutely fringed rear margin is present between the long, thin nostrils. The mouth is relatively small, with a deep concavity at the center of the lower jaw and shallow furrows at the corners extending onto the lower jaw. A row of 4–5 papillae (nipple-like structures) is found across the floor of the mouth. There are 26–40 upper tooth rows and 27–44 lower tooth rows. The pelvic fins are small and triangular. The tail is whip-like and extremely thin, measuring 3–3.5 times as long as the disc when intact, and lacks fin folds. Usually one serrated stinging spine is located on the upper surface on the tail, some distance from the base.

Adult rays have a wide band of flattened, heart-shaped dermal denticles that extend from between the eyes to the tail spine, increasing in density with age, along with two large pearl thorns at the center of the back. The tail behind the spine is covered by small thorns. The dorsal band of denticles is largely developed by the time the juveniles are 50 cm (20 in) across. The coloration of the reticulate whipray varies substantially with age and locality. Adults generally have a dorsal pattern of numerous closely spaced dark brown spots or reticulations on a beige to yellow-brown background, which becomes blackish past the spine with lighter bands on the sides. This textured coloration is often described as a "beehive pattern," and is a prime example of a Voronoi cell that arises frequently in nature featuring repeated arrays of polygonal structures. This pattern has been found to be an evolutionary optimization that minimizes constructional energy for the pattern in addition to providing cryptic coloration. The ventral side a pale, white color without markings. Juveniles are yellowish above with tiny, densely packed dark spots, around seven spots in a line between the spiracles, and three rows of spots in front of the sting. These spots tend be larger in juveniles and reduce in size as the individual ages to form the distinct "honeycomb/leopard" pattern and is considered a Negative Allometric Growth Pattern. This large species has been reported to reach a disc width of 2 m (6.6 ft), a total length of 6 m (20 ft), and a weight of 120 kg (260 lb).

== Distribution and habitat ==
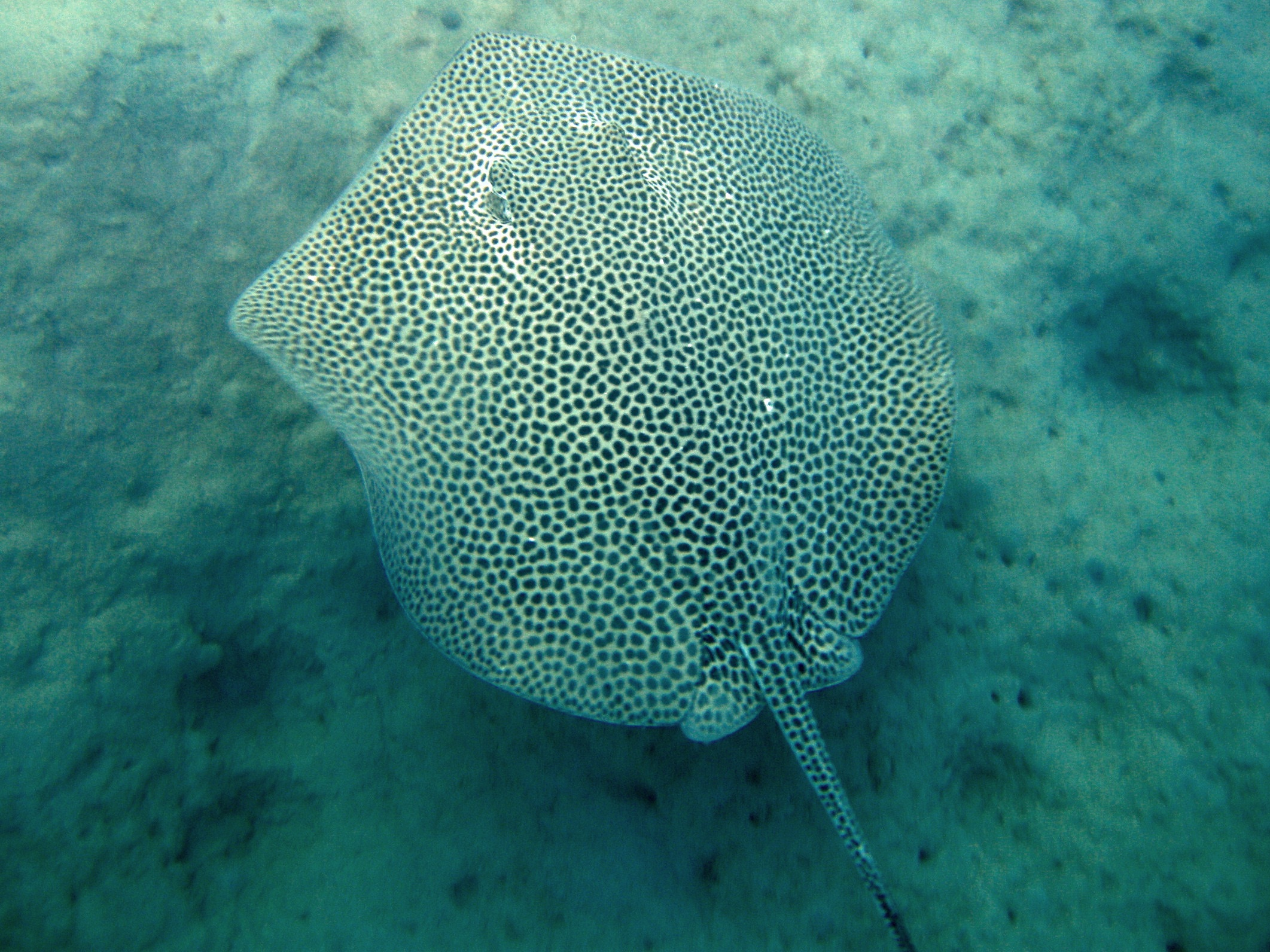
The reticulate whipray frequents areas with fine sediment.

Habitat of the reticulate whipray includes coral reefs, brackish water and marine environments. Within these ecosystems they can be found inshore and on soft substrates. Distribution occurs in the North of Taiwan, the Western Indian Ocean (mainly in Malaysia, Myanmar, Indo-Pacific), The Red Sea, west to the Natal in South Africa, and the Arabian Sea. It also entered 30 years ago the Mediterranean Sea through the Suez Canal and it is now common in the south eastern Mediterranean. The recently described H. australis formerly confused with H. uarnak seems to be common only in Australian waters, where it occurs from Shark Bay to Brisbane.

Bottom-dwelling in nature, the reticulate whipray is generally encountered over sandy flats near beaches, in lagoons, and around coral reefs, from the intertidal zone to offshore waters 50 m (160 ft) deep or more. These microhabitats (intertidal sand flats, shallow subtidal sand flats and seagrass beds) are found to be shifted in use between warm and cold seasons. In Shark Bay, it frequents intertidal sand flats during the warm season, and shifts to slightly deeper seagrass patches in the cold season. This species is tolerant of low salinities and has been known to enter estuaries and mangrove swamps, though records from fresh water in Southeast Asia are unverified and may represent misidentifications. Its preferred water temperatures are 23–26 °C (73–79 °F).

== Biology and ecology ==
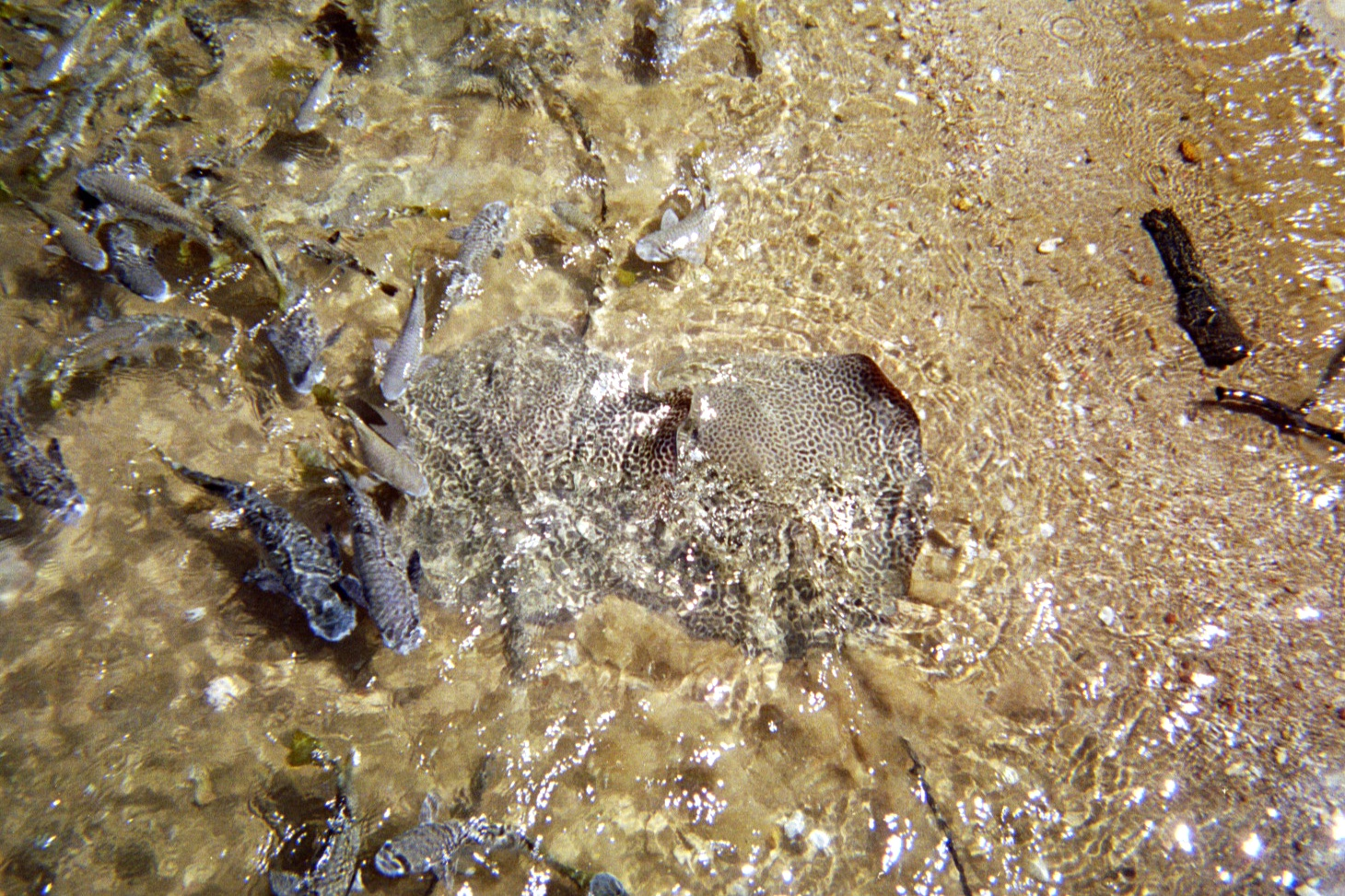
Two reticulate whiprays (either Himantura leoparda or H. australis) and other fish being fed on a beach near Darwin, Australia.

During the day, the reticulate whipray is generally inactive and spends much time resting motionless on the sea floor, sometimes buried in sand. In Shark Bay, Western Australia, this ray can be found resting singly or in small groups in very shallow water during high tide. Life history in shallow, bright light conditions have evolved the ray's sight to specialize for photopic vision. These eyes contain a concentration of ganglion cells, cones and spatial resolving power that indicate color vision, elongated horizontal specialization of visual acuity.

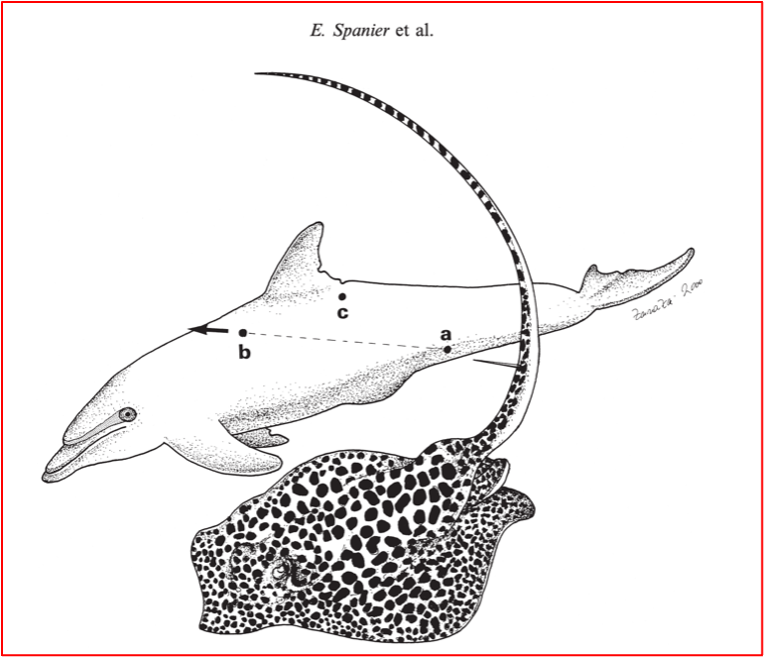
Diagram of the defense method often executed by Himantura uarnak

A lateral line is present on the ray and extends to the tip of its extremely long tail, giving it advance warning of approaching predators such as bottlenose dolphins (Tursiops aduncus) and hammerhead sharks (Sphyrna). A few extremely rare encounters have documented dolphins being injured, even killed, from wounds caused from a reticulate whipray's barbs found inserted within porpoise's sides. These encounters are theorized to most likely occur in shallow shore feeding sites where Himantura uarnak tend to reside. Severity of reaction to barbule wounds is not considered to be correlated to the age or size of the whipray. As the whiprays age, there is a higher chance of losing the venom glands and the spine's protective sheath on the individual. The cowtail stingray (Pastinachus sephen) prefers to rest with the reticulate whipray over others of its own species, because the whiprays' longer tails grant them superior predator detection. These mixed-species groups often settle into a "rosette" with their tails pointing radially outward for maximum predator awareness.

The reticulate whipray preys on a variety of benthic and neritic organisms, including crabs, shrimps, mantis shrimps, bivalves, gastropods, worms, jellyfish, and bony fishes. In the western Indian Ocean, about two-thirds of its diet consists of fishes, in particular ponyfish and anchovies, with shrimps and other crustaceans making up most of the remainder. By contrast, rays in Australian waters are apparently not piscivorous, and are known to consume penaeid prawns. Himantura uarnak play an important ecological role as a mesopredator and are thought to exert a strong top-down impact on nearshore environments in the absence of human disturbance. Benthic feeding predators including the Reticulate whipray, are associated with trophic cascades that result in higher population densities of rays when overfishing of tertiary predators (mainly sharks) occurs.

Known parasites of this species include Anthrobothrium loculatum, Dendromonocotyle colorni, Halysiorhynchus macrocephalus, Monocotyle helicophallus, M. multiparous, and M. spiremae, Thaumatocotyle australensis, and Tylocephalum chiralensis. One marine bacterium Vibrio alginolyticus, has been documented to infect reticulate whiprays that causes lethargy, whitish necrotic skin lesions, and skin ulcers and can be treated with amikacin to prevent mortality.

Like other stingrays, the reticulate whipray is aplacental viviparous: the developing embryos are initially sustained by yolk, which is later supplanted by histotroph ("uterine milk", enriched with proteins and lipids) produced by the mother. Females give birth to up to five pups in the summer, after a year-long gestation period. Off South Africa, the newborns measure 28–30 cm (11–12 in) across and sexual maturation is attained at a disc width of approximately 1 m (3.3 ft), which corresponds to an age of 4-5. Off Australia, the newborns measure 21–28 cm (8.3–11.0 in) across, with males reported to mature at 82–84 cm (32–33 in) across. The juveniles of H. leoparda and H. undulata differ in birth size, disc shape, denticle development, and amount of spotting, and are in fact more distinct from each other than are adults of Himantura spp. species. Shark Bay may serve as a nursery area for young rays. While species in the 'uarnak' species complex appear morphologically and physiologically similar, interspecific hybridization has not yet been clearly documented from nuclear genetic markers. It is possible that interspecific differences in the female urogenital sinus and the varying distal length and shape of the male's clasper result in reproductive isolation.

== Human interactions ==
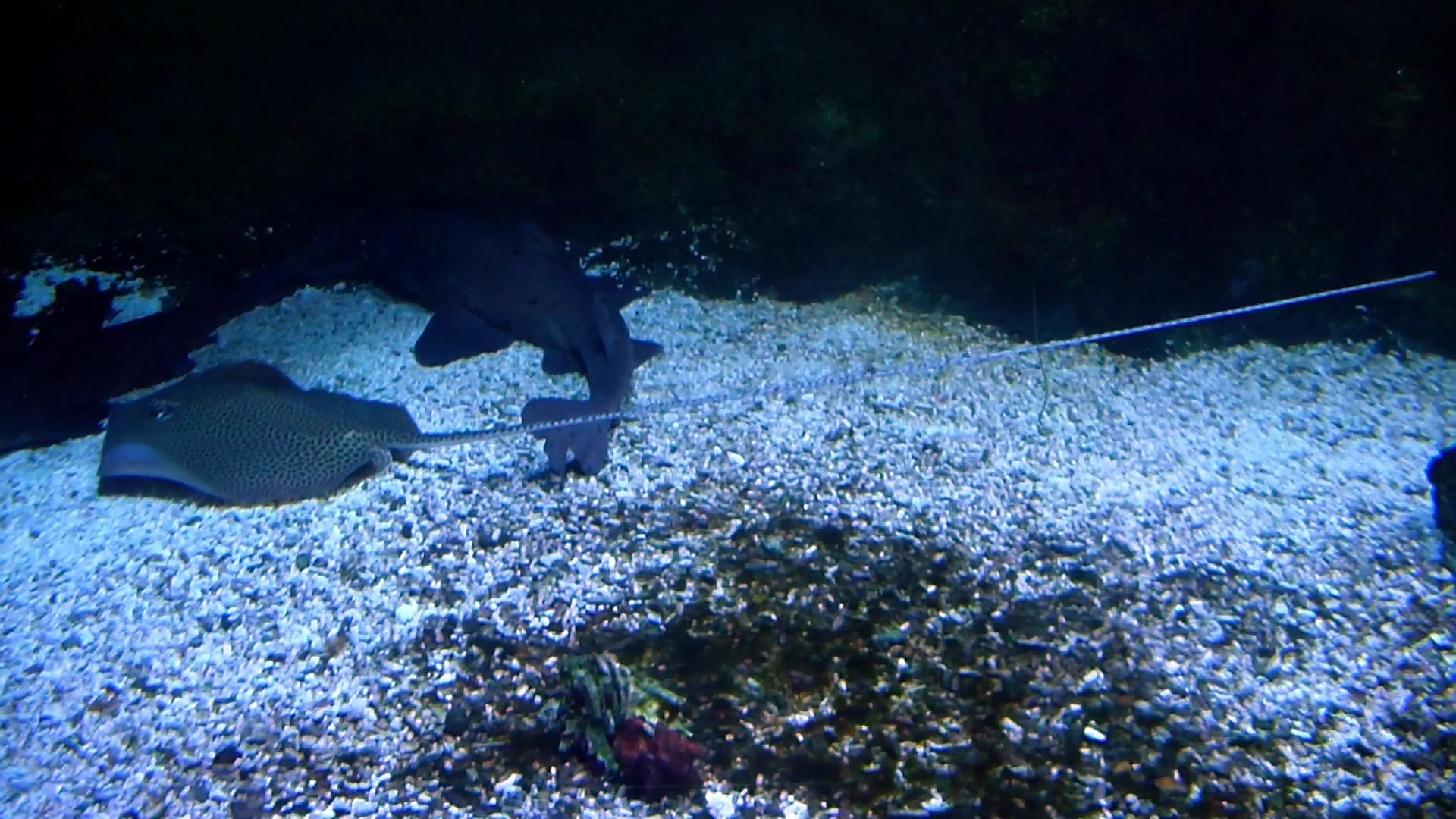
A reticulate whipray at the Palais de la Porte Dorée Tropical Aquarium in Paris.

The reticulate whipray fights strongly on hook-and-line and is thus popular with recreational anglers, who usually release it alive. This species is caught by intensive artisanal and commercial fisheries operating in parts of the western Indian Ocean, using bottom trawls, gillnets and tangle nets, beach seines, and longlines. Fisheries off the coasts of Pakistan have also documented catching reticulate whiprays with one study stating that from 1977-2019 approximately more than 2840 m tones of the uarnak complex caught as bycatch from fisheries. 1982 was documented to be the peak commercial stingray fishing era with more than 49,017 m tons of stingrays caught and sold. Peak season to catch whiprays has been found to be from May to August. Commercially caught whiprays are often used as raw materials to produce fishmeal for the poultry industry, with some of the "wings" being exported to Malaysia and Thailand.

The meat, skin, and cartilage are utilized, though this species is not a highly valued food fish. It also has applications in Chinese medicine, and its tail may be sold as a curio. Traditional medicine in India used to use the reticulate whiprays as lactogogues; in which consuming the meat was found to enhance milk production for new mothers (particularly by poorer sections in society.) In addition to this, the whiprays have been used to treat dysentery, wheezing and bronchitis in Tamil Nadu state, mainly by coastal and tribal people in South Asia and Myanmar.

The International Union for Conservation of Nature (IUCN) has listed the reticulate whipray as Endangered. Its large size, inshore habitat preferences, and slow reproductive rate render it susceptible to overfishing. Although specific data is lacking, significant declines in overall ray catches have been documented within its range. Non specific data of whipray in Malaysia and Indonesia have estimated that localized population have reduced by 50-99% over the past three generations. Globally populations are suspected to have reduced by 50-75% in the last 75 years. Habitat degradation also threatens this species, while pollution and destructive fishing practices may have also taken their toll.

The reticulate whipray is occasionally offered within the home aquarium trade. It is best avoided, however, because of its massive proportions. It is also kept in some public aquariums such as the Aquarium of the Pacific (where it is one of the aquarium's largest inhabitants), the Atlantis Dubai hotel aquarium, and the California Academy of Sciences' Steinhart Aquarium.

== Conservation ==
The reticulate whipray's endangered IUCN status has led to increasing concerns for global population security. Recent research has highlighted to need to conserve lagoonal environments that maintain unimpeded hydrological flow of tidal water. Protecting healthy mangroves, seagrass beds, and mudflat habitats ensures food security and refuges for megafauna including the reticulate whipray. In addition to this, movement corridors need to be prioritized to ensure connectivity between foraging sites and juvenile and adult habitats. Designing and implementing Marine Protected Areas (MPAs) is one of the key first steps to ensuring a secure habitat for the whiprays. Integration of techniques such as environmental DNA analyses can be used to effectively monitor localized populations and their critical habitats.
