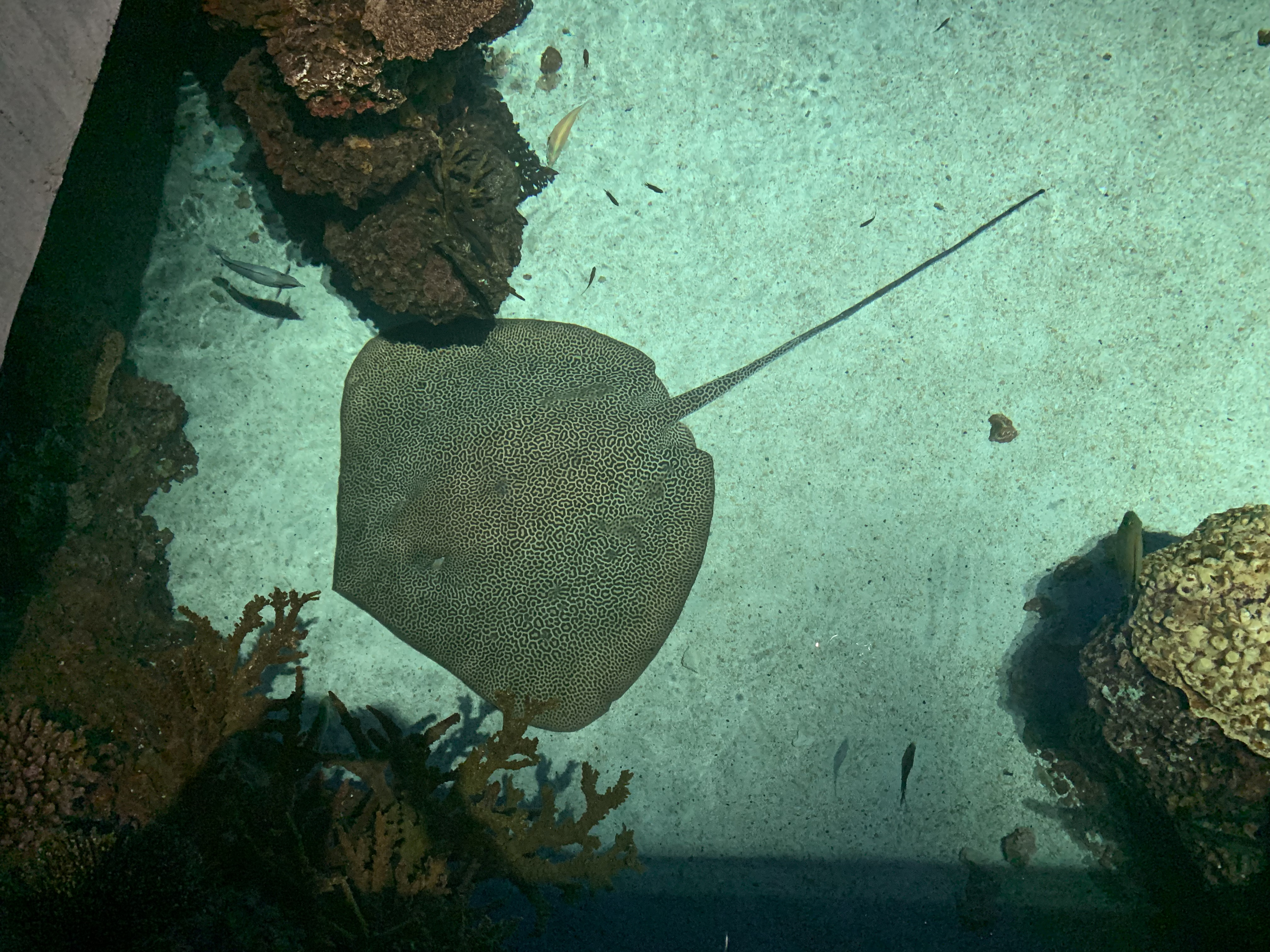
- A live specimen of Australia whipray in National Zoo & Aquarium, Canberra

Conservation status
- Least Concern (IUCN 3.1)

Scientific classification
- Kingdom: Animalia
- Phylum: Chordata
- Class: Chondrichthyes
- Subclass: Elasmobranchii
- Order: Myliobatiformes
- Family: Dasyatidae
- Genus: Himantura
- Species: H. australis

Binomial name
- Himantura australis Last, W. T. White, & Naylor, 2016

= Himantura australis =

Species of Elasmobranchii

Himantura australis, the Australian whipray, is a type of whiptail stingray found mainly in Australia and south of New Guinea island. This species is a minor bycatch and usually released back to ocean by Australian trawlers, although it might be retained for human consumption by the New Guinean locals.

== Description ==
This species can be distinguished from several characteristics, such as weakly rhomboidal-shaped disc, short preorbital snout, narrowly rounded lateral apices, yellow-pale brown body color, white-colored underside, and fully covered in scattered dark brown speckles or reticulations. The maximum size of the female specimen is 140 cm disc width.

== Habitat & distribution ==
This species distribution range encompasses Northern Territory, Western Australia, and Queensland in Australia, and both Indonesian Papua and the sovereign Papua New Guinea. It inhabits the shallow habitats and ranges from the surface to a depth of around 45 m. It is often accidentally caught by trawlers and fishers in Australian region, but it might be a target and used as delicacy by the locals of Papua New Guinea.
