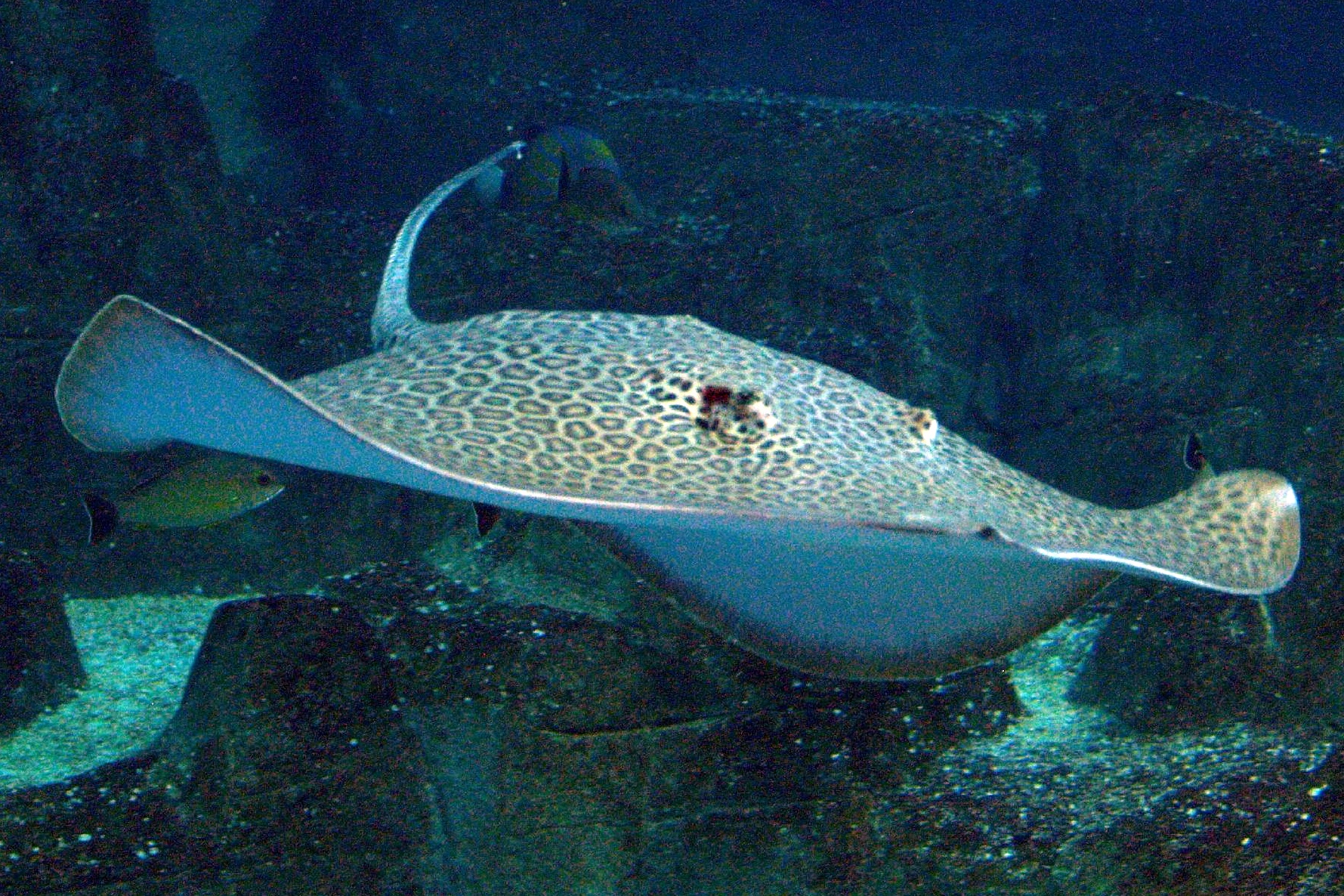

Conservation status
- Endangered (IUCN 3.1)

Scientific classification
- Kingdom: Animalia
- Phylum: Chordata
- Class: Chondrichthyes
- Subclass: Elasmobranchii
- Order: Myliobatiformes
- Family: Dasyatidae
- Genus: Himantura
- Species: H. leoparda

Binomial name
- Himantura leoparda Manjaji-Matsumoto & Last, 2008

= Leopard whipray =

Species of cartilaginous fish

The leopard whipray (Himantura leoparda) is a little-known species of stingray in the family Dasyatidae, found in the central Indo-West Pacific region, from the Andaman Sea to the Coral Triangle. It is found close to shore at depths shallower than 70 m (230 ft), over soft substrates. Attaining a width of 1.8 m (5.9 ft), this species has a diamond-shaped pectoral fin disc with a pointed snout and an extremely long, whip-like tail without fin folds. Adult rays have a leopard-like dorsal pattern of dark brown rings on a yellowish brown background, as well as a row of enlarged, heart-shaped dermal denticles along the midline of the disc. Newborns and small juveniles have large, solid dark spots and few denticles. The leopard whipray is caught by fisheries in many parts of its range, primarily for meat.

== Taxonomy ==
Historically, the leopard stingray has been conflated with the reticulate whipray (H. uarnak) or the honeycomb whipray (H. undulata or its synonym, H. fava) in literature; all three are closely similar in size, shape, and coloration. It was described as a distinct species by Peter Last and Mabel Manjaji-Matsumoto in a 2008 Commonwealth Scientific and Industrial Research Organisation CSIRO publication, and given the specific epithet leoparda in reference to its patterns of coloration. The type specimen is a female 1.1 m (3.6 ft) across, collected from the Gulf of Carpentaria northwest of Weipa, Queensland. Genetic research further showed that H. leoparda as originally defined itself included a cryptic species that was subsequently described as H. tutul. Another common name for this species is the undulate whipray. It belongs to a larger 'uarnak' species complex that also contains H. australis, H. tutul, H. uarnak, and H. undulata.

== Distribution and habitat ==
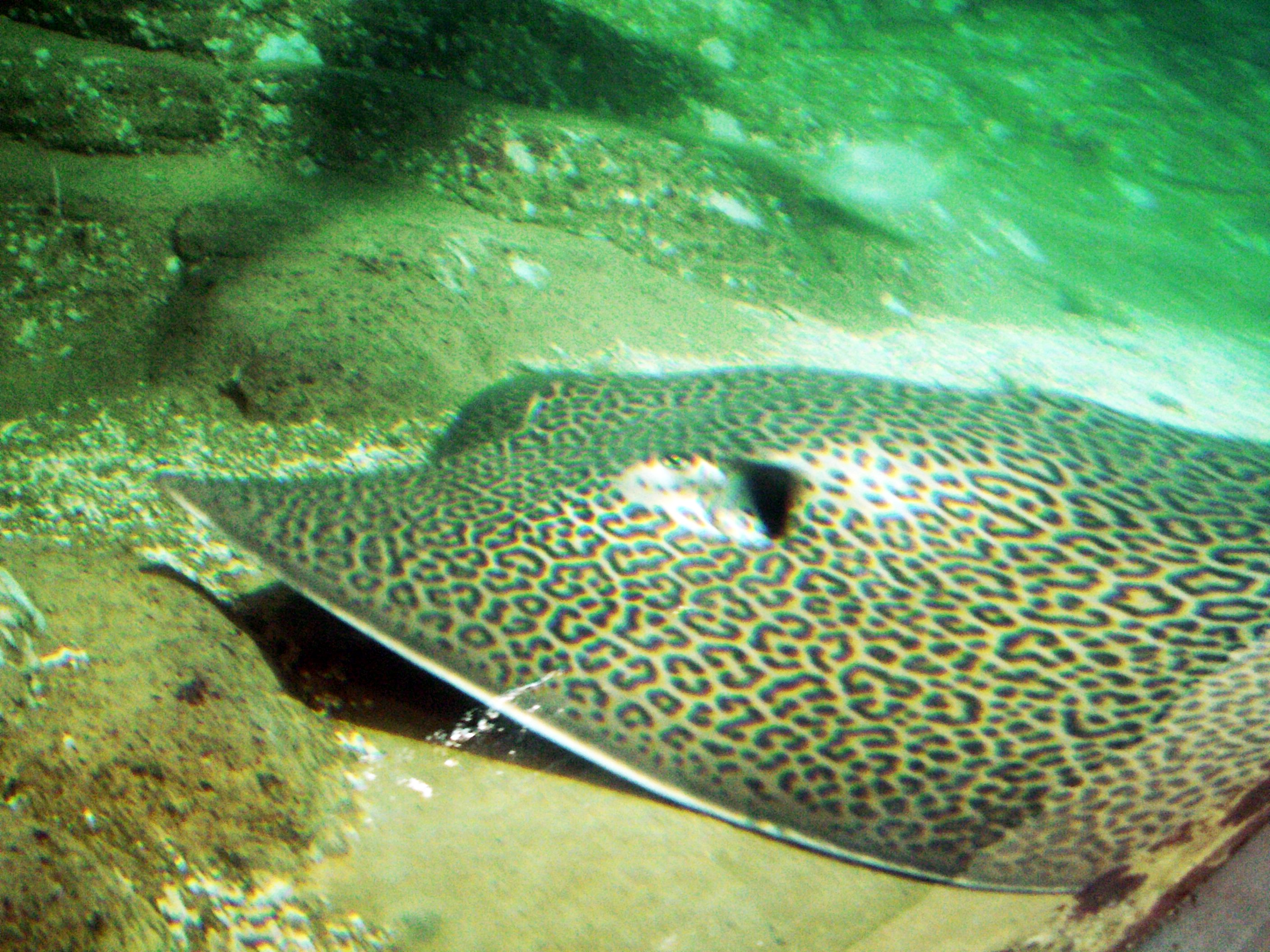
The leopard whipray is found on or near the bottom, preferring fine sediment.

The leopard whipray has been reported from off the Andaman Sea, throughout Southeast Asia including the Philippines, southern Japan and Taiwan, New Guinea, and northern Australia from Coral Bay to the Cape York Peninsula. Bottom-dwelling in nature, the leopard whipray is found close inshore over soft-bottomed habitats. It is known to occur to a depth of 70 m (230 ft). Reported occurrences of the leopard whipray in the Indian Ocean west of the Andaman Sea, including Bangladesh, Sri Lanka and South Africa have not been genetically validated and could therefore be misidentifications.

== Description ==
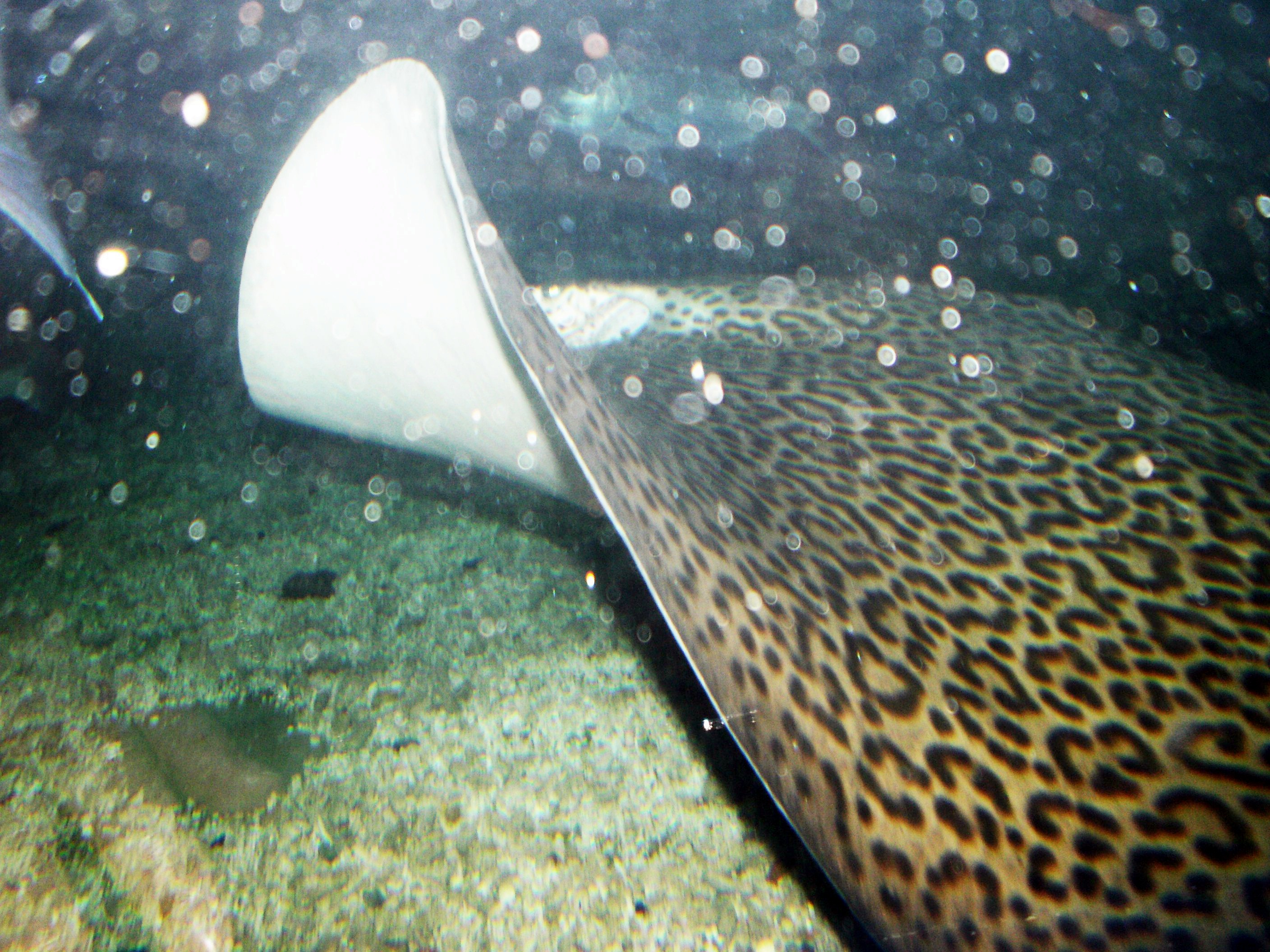
The leopard whipray resembles its namesake in dorsal coloration.

A large species reaching 1.4 m (4.6 ft) across and 4.1 m (13 ft) long, the leopard whipray has a diamond-shaped pectoral fin disc wider than long and rather thick at the center, with narrowly rounded to angular outer corners. The leading margins are sinuous and converge to a broadly triangular snout; the tip of the snout protrudes as a distinct, pointed lobe. In juveniles the disc is nearly equal in length and width. The eyes are small and immediately followed by much larger, roughly rectangular spiracles. Between the long, narrow nostrils is a wide, skirt-shaped flap of skin with a finely fringed posterior margin. The mouth is strongly bow-shaped, with shallow furrows at the corners. There are four short papillae (nipple-like structures) on the floor of the mouth, as a central pair and a much smaller outer pair; papillae are also found on the lower jaw. The teeth are small, conical, and blunt, numbering around 59 rows in the upper jaw. The five pairs of gill slits are S-shaped. The pelvic fins are fairly slender; males have stout claspers.

The very thin, whip-like tail measures 2.5–3.8 times as long as the disc, and bears usually one serrated stinging spine on top about half a disc width behind the tail base; there are no fin folds. Adults have a broad band of tiny, closely spaced granules extending from before the eyes, onto to the tail. At the center of the disc, there is a midline row of up to 15 enlarged, heart-shaped denticles, with the two largest ones located one after the other between the "shoulders". There are no enlarged denticles on the base of the tail. When born, this species is grayish to brownish above with large black spots, a row of dark spots on either side of the tail until the sting, and beyond it alternating dark and light rings. The spots hollow out at around a disc width of 55 cm (22 in), such as that large juveniles and adults are mostly covered by a leopard-like pattern of large, dark brown rings on a yellowish-brown background. The dark and light rings on the tail fade ventrally to become saddles. The underside is uniformly white. This ray was thought to have two alternate color morphs including a typical leopard-like form and a "fine-leopard pattern" form but subsequent research showed that these were distinct, reproductively isolated species, respectively H. leoparda and H. tutul.

== Biology and ecology ==
The natural history of the leopard whipray is poorly understood, partly due to confusion with other species. It presumably preys on crustaceans and small fishes. Like other stingrays, it is aplacental viviparous, with the developing embryos sustained by histotroph ("uterine milk") produced by the mother. The newborns measure roughly 20 cm (7.9 in) across and 92 cm (36 in) long, smaller than in H. uarnak and H. undulata, and have few or no denticles. Also in contrast to those two species, young leopard whiprays 50 cm (20 in) across have still not developed the dorsal denticle band. Sexual maturity is attained at 70–80 cm (28–31 in) across for males. Known parasites of this species include the tapeworms Parachristianella indonesiensis and P. baverstocki.

== Human interactions ==
The International Union for Conservation of Nature (IUCN) has assessed the leopard whipray as an endangered species. In parts of Indonesia and probably elsewhere, it is heavily fished for its meat and possibly also skin and cartilage, using bottom trawls, tangle nets, and longlines. Most individuals caught in eastern Indonesia are juveniles.
