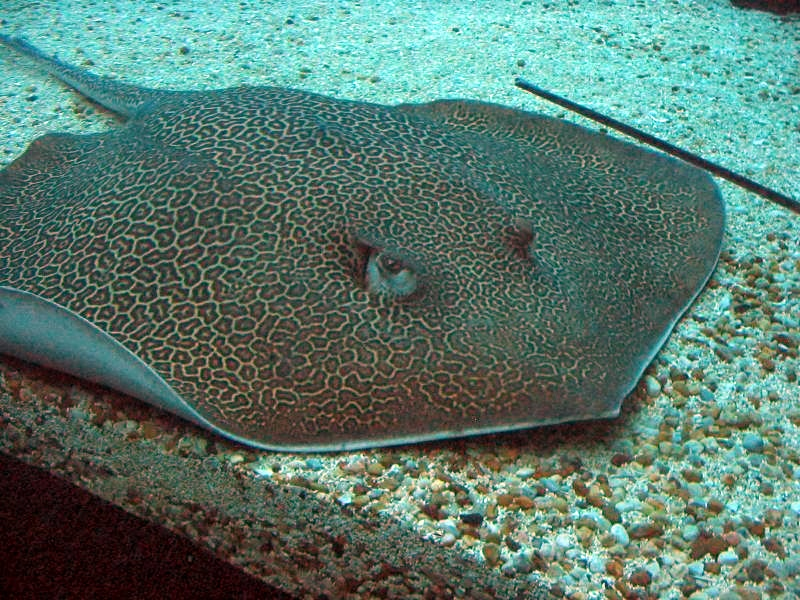

Conservation status
- Endangered (IUCN 3.1)

Scientific classification
- Kingdom: Animalia
- Phylum: Chordata
- Class: Chondrichthyes
- Subclass: Elasmobranchii
- Order: Myliobatiformes
- Family: Dasyatidae
- Genus: Himantura
- Species: H. undulata

Binomial name
- Himantura undulata (Bleeker, 1852)

Synonyms
- Trygon undulata Bleeker, 1852

= Honeycomb whipray =

Species of cartilaginous fish

The honeycomb whipray (Himantura undulata) is a species of stingray in the family Dasyatidae, found widely in the shallow coastal waters of the Indo-Pacific from India to the Malay Archipelago. This large species grows to 1.3 m (4.3 ft) across and has a diamond-shaped disc with rounded corners and a projecting, pointed snout. Its tail is long and whip-like, without fin folds. Adults have a striking dorsal color pattern consisting of large, dark brown rings and reticulations delineated by thin yellow lines, while juveniles have a pattern of large dark spots. This ray can also be distinguished from its similar relatives by an enlarged, pearl-like dermal denticle at the center of the back, which is followed by a few thorns. The International Union for Conservation of Nature (IUCN) has assessed the honeycomb whipray as endangered, as it faces heavy fishing pressure and habitat degradation across much of its range.

== Taxonomy ==
Dutch ichthyologist Pieter Bleeker first referenced the honeycomb whipray as Trygon undulata, in an 1850 list of Javanese fishes. Two years later, he formally described the species in the scientific journal Verhandelingen van het Bataviaasch Genootschap van Kunsten en Wetenschappen (Memoirs of the Batavian Society of Arts and Sciences), based on three specimens caught off Jakarta and Semarang. Later authors assigned it to the genus Himantura. Other common names for this ray include Bleeker's variegate ray and ocellate whipray.

The reticulate whipray (H. uarnak), the leopard whipray (H. leoparda), the fine-spotted leopard whipray (H. tutul), and the Australian whipray (H. australis) are closely related to the honeycomb whipray. The five species are very similar in size, shape, and coloration, which has resulted in a great deal of confusion: H. undulata, H. leoparda and H. tutul have often been misidentified as H. uarnak, while many references to "H. undulata" are in fact of H. leoparda, with the synonym H. fava used instead for the real H. undulata.

== Description ==
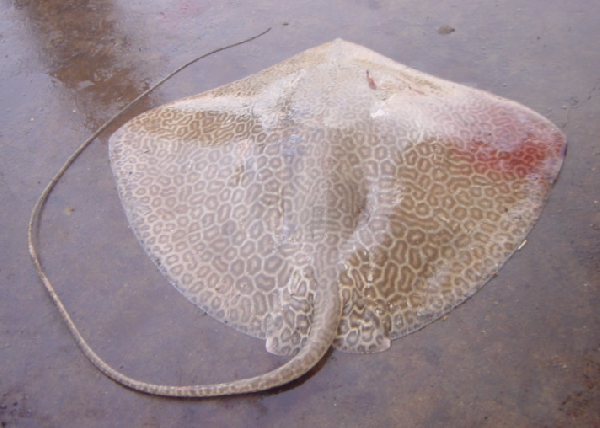
Adult showing the distinctive large, honeycomb-like rings over the disc.

The honeycomb whipray has a diamond-shaped, rather thin pectoral fin disc slightly wider than long, with broadly rounded outer corners and concave leading margins converging on a pointed, protruding snout. The eyes are small and immediately followed by much larger spiracles. There is a skirt-shaped flap of skin with a finely fringed posterior margin between the long, narrow nostrils. The mouth is strongly bow-shaped, with shallow furrows at the corners, and contains a pair of papillae (nipple-shaped structures) on the floor. The teeth are small and have a low, transverse ridge on the crown. The pelvic fins are small and roughly triangular.

The tail is thin and whip-like, measuring about twice as long as the disc, and lacks fin folds. Usually a single serrated, stinging spine is placed on the dorsal surface, relatively close to the tail base. Adults have a broad band of small, flattened dermal denticles running centrally from before the eyes, over the back, onto the tail. At the center of the disc, there is an enlarged, round "pearl" denticle trailed by 2–3 smaller thorns along the midline; there are no enlarged denticles on the base of the tail. Newborns have large, well-spaced dark spots covering the disc. With age, the dorsal coloration becomes a honeycomb-like pattern of large, nearly black rings (ocelli) and reticulations, that are separated from each other by thin yellow lines. The tail is covered by alternating dark and light bands or other markings past the sting. The underside is white. This species has been reported to a disc width of 1.3 m (4.3 ft).

== Distribution and habitat ==
The range of the honeycomb whipray is not well-defined due to confusion with other species. It seems to occur widely in the tropical Indo-Pacific region, from India to the Indo-Malay archipelago, but not off Australia (all Australian records of H. undulata appear to be H. leoparda). It has been reported from off southern Africa, but these records have not been validated genetically. This benthic species inhabits inshore waters and prefers habitats with soft substrates, including sandy and muddy flats, lagoons, and brackish estuaries and mangrove swamps.

== Biology and ecology ==
Little is known of the natural history of the honeycomb whipray. It is typically encountered lying still on the bottom, often partially or completely buried in sediment. Presumably, it feeds on crustaceans and small fishes. Reproduction is aplacental viviparous as in other stingrays, with the mother provisioning her developing embryos with histotroph ("uterine milk"). Newborns measure about 26–27 cm (10–11 in) across, larger than H. leoparda. Also unlike H. leoparda, by a disc width of 50 cm (20 in) juvenile rays have a well-developed dorsal denticle band. Males reach sexual maturity at 60–70 cm (24–28 in) across.

== Human interactions ==
Intensive commercial and artisanal fisheries throughout Indonesia and elsewhere catch the honeycomb whipray, using tangle nets, bottom trawls, and Danish seines, and occasionally also longlines. It is mainly marketed for its meat, though the skin and cartilage may also be utilized. Fishing pressure is intensifying in many portions of its range, such as the Gulf of Thailand, with this species particularly susceptible due to its inshore habits. Its habitat preferences also expose it to habitat degradation from coastal development, water pollution, and destructive fishing practices (i.e. blast fishing). Because of these threats, the International Union for Conservation of Nature (IUCN) suspects the population of the honeycomb whipray has declined, and has assessed it as endangered.
