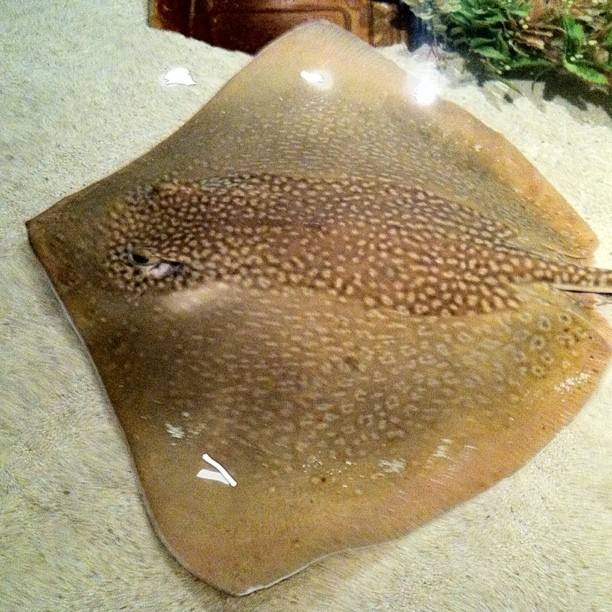

Conservation status
- Endangered (IUCN 3.1)

Scientific classification
- Kingdom: Animalia
- Phylum: Chordata
- Class: Chondrichthyes
- Subclass: Elasmobranchii
- Order: Myliobatiformes
- Family: Dasyatidae
- Genus: Maculabatis
- Species: M. gerrardi

Binomial name
- Maculabatis gerrardi (Gray, 1851)

Synonyms
- Trygon gerrardi J. E. Gray, 1851; Trygon macrurus Bleeker, 1852; Dasyatis gerrardi (Gray, 1851); Himantura gerrardi (Gray, 1851); Himantura gerrardii (Gray, 1851); Trygon liocephalus Klunzinger, 1871

= Whitespotted whipray =

Species of cartilaginous fish

The whitespotted whipray or sharpnose stingray (Maculabatis gerrardi) is a species of stingray in the family Dasyatidae. It is found in coastal regions including estuaries, in the Indo-Pacific, and has also been recorded in the Ganges River. It reaches a maximum disc width of 2 m (6.6 ft). As presently defined, it is probably a species complex.

== Etymology ==
The Stingray is named in honor of Edward Gerrard (1810-1910), a taxidermist at the British Museum of Natural History, who with his shark and ray identifications assisted Gray.
