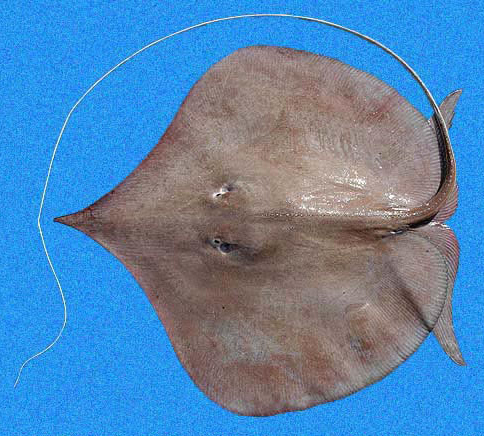

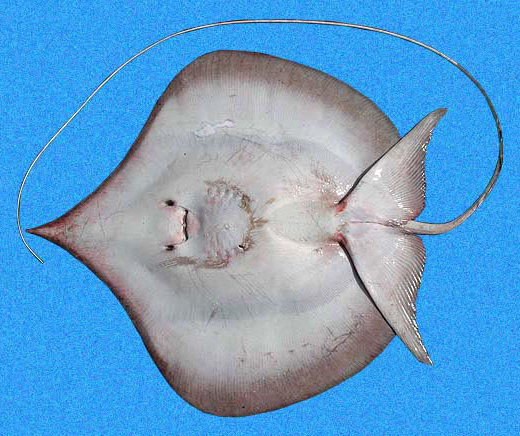

Conservation status
- Critically Endangered (IUCN 3.1)

Scientific classification
- Kingdom: Animalia
- Phylum: Chordata
- Class: Chondrichthyes
- Subclass: Elasmobranchii
- Order: Myliobatiformes
- Family: Dasyatidae
- Genus: Fontitrygon
- Species: F. geijskesi

Binomial name
- Fontitrygon geijskesi Boeseman, 1948
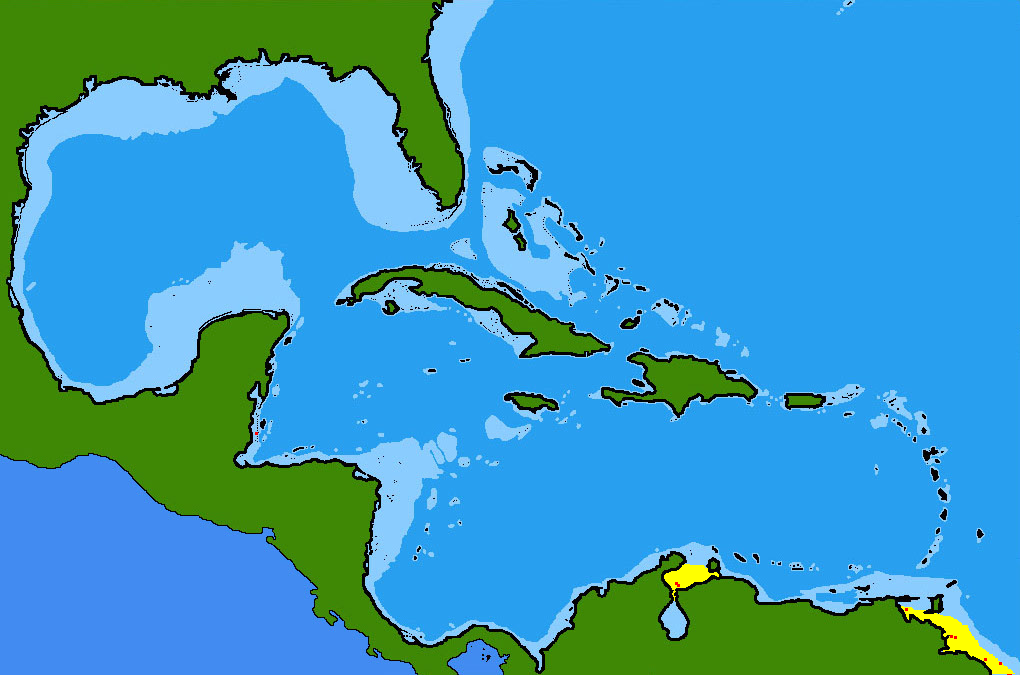

Synonyms
- Dasyatis geijskesi

= Sharpsnout stingray =

Species of cartilaginous fish

The sharpsnout stingray or wingfin stingray (Fontitrygon geijskesi) is a species of stingray in the family Dasyatidae, found from off Venezuela to northern Brazil. It inhabits shallow, brackish water, shifting towards the coast in the dry season and away from it in the rainy season. Typically measuring 70 cm (28 in) across, this dark brown ray is easily identifiable by its long, projecting snout and elongated, acutely pointed pelvic fins. Its diet consists of bottom-dwelling invertebrates. Reproduction is aplacental viviparous, with females bearing one to three pups annually. Naturally uncommon and slow-reproducing, the sharpnose stingray is under pressure by both artisanal and commercial fisheries, leading the International Union for Conservation of Nature (IUCN) to assess it as critically endangered.

== Taxonomy and phylogeny ==
Dutch ichthyologist Marinus Boeseman described the sharpsnout stingray in a 1948 issue of the scientific journal Zoologische Mededelingen, based on a juvenile male caught off Suriname with a disc length of 36 cm (14 in). The whereabouts of this type specimen is unknown. In a 2001 phylogenetic analysis based on morphological characters, Lisa Rosenberger found that the longnose stingray (Hypanus guttata) is the sister species of the sharpsnout stingray, and that the two form a clade with the pale-edged stingray (Telatrygon zugei), the pearl stingray (Fontitrygon margaritella), the sharpnose stingray (Maculabatis gerrardi), and the smooth butterfly ray (Gymnura micrura, included in the study as an outgroup). These results support the growing consensus that neither Dasyatis nor Himantura are monophyletic.

== Distribution and habitat ==
One of the less common stingrays within its range, the sharpsnout stingray is found in nearshore, brackish waters along the northeastern coast of South America, from Venezuela and Trinidad and Tobago to northern Brazil; many occur in the estuarine area affected by the freshwater discharge of the Amazon River. It favors muddy habitats 5–25 m (16–82 ft) deep, with low visibility. However, Uyeno et al. (1983) gave a depth of 810 m (2,660 ft) for this species. The sharpsnout stingray conducts annual movements that are affected by salinity, entering coastal bays such as Marajó Bay during the rainy season and shifting to offshore waters during the rainy season.

== Description ==
The pectoral fin disc of the sharpsnout stingray is about as wide as long, with strongly concave leading margins and rounded corners. The snout is long and projecting, measuring 39–54% as long as the disc is wide. The eyes are minute and followed by much larger spiracles. There is a flap of skin between the nares, with a finely fringed posterior margin. The line of the mouth is slightly indented at the center. The upper and lower jaws both contain 56–68 tooth rows; the teeth are blunt and arranged with a quincunx pattern. A transverse row of 5 papillae are present on the floor of the mouth.

The pelvic fins are distinctive, being over twice as long as wide with a gently sinuous trailing margin, and tapering to an acute tip that sometimes extends past the disc. The whip-like tail measures over twice the length of the disc and bears 1–2 serrated spines on top. Posterior to the spines are a subtle dorsal keel and a ventral fin fold about half as long as the disc. A band of small tubercles runs along the dorsal midline from behind the eyes to the base of the tail (excluding a posterior portion of the disc), with larger tubercles in a central row and on each "shoulder". More conical tubercles are scattered over the upper surface of the tail past the spines. The coloration is a uniform brown above, and white below darkening towards the disc margin. This species typically attains a disc width of 70 cm (28 in), but individuals up to 1.5 m (4.9 ft) across have been recorded.

== Biology and ecology ==
The sharpsnout stingray feeds on small burrowing invertebrates such as worms, crustaceans, and molluscs, excavating them from the substrate and grinding them apart with its pavement-like teeth. Like other stingrays, this species is aplacental viviparous, with females giving birth to 1–3 young every year. Similarly to the Colares stingray (Fontitrygon colarensis), the annual movements of this ray may relate to reproduction as most females found near the coast are newly impregnated. Younger individuals have proportionately longer tails (measuring up to three times the disc width) than adults.

== Human interactions ==
The sharp, venomous tail spines of the sharpsnout stingray are potentially hazardous to humans. This species is caught by hook-and-line or in nets; it is used for food by subsistence fishers, but is not favored because its flesh is a dark reddish color. Sharpsnout stingrays also form part of the bycatch of artisanal and commercial fisheries targeting large catfish in the Amazon estuary, while increasing interest in using stingrays for minced fish products may intensify fishing pressure on this species in the future. Because of these threats and the slow reproductive rate of this ray, the International Union for Conservation of Nature (IUCN) has assessed it as Critically Endangered.
