= Sharpnose stingray =

Sharpnose stingray may refer to:

- Telatrygon acutirostra
- Telatrygon zugei
- Maculabatis gerrardi
- Pateobatis jenkinsii
