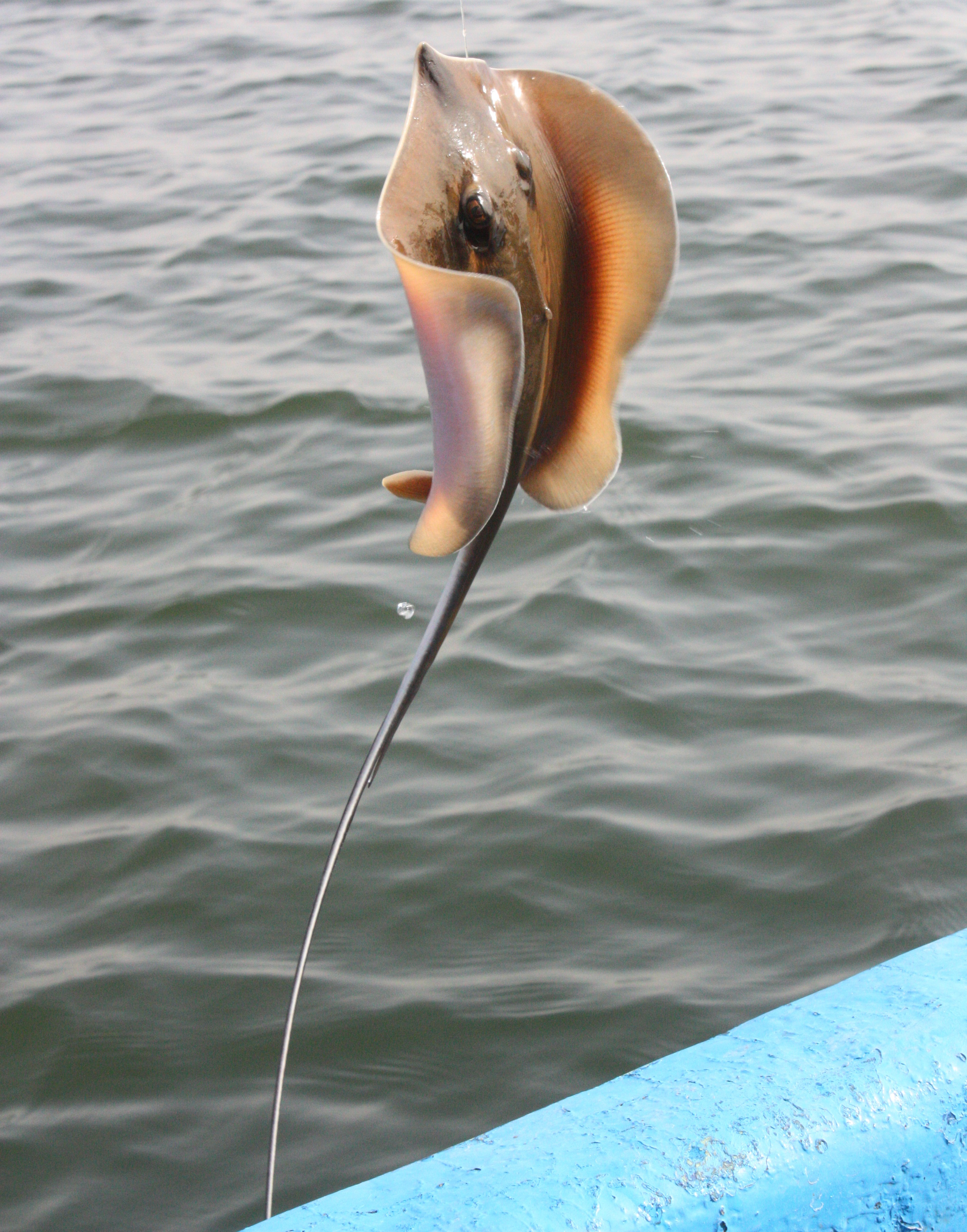

Conservation status
- Near Threatened (IUCN 3.1)

Scientific classification
- Kingdom: Animalia
- Phylum: Chordata
- Class: Chondrichthyes
- Subclass: Elasmobranchii
- Order: Myliobatiformes
- Family: Dasyatidae
- Subfamily: Urogymninae
- Genus: Fontitrygon
- Species: F. margaritella

Binomial name
- Fontitrygon margaritella (Compagno & T. R. Roberts, 1984)

Synonyms
- Dasyatis margaritella Compagno & Roberts, 1984

= Pearl stingray =

Pearl stingray Temporal range: 7.246–0 Ma Miocene to Present

Species of cartilaginous fish

The pearl stingray (Fontitrygon margaritella) is a little-known species of stingray in the family Dasyatidae, found in shallow coastal waters from Mauritania to Angola, though fossils have been found in Portugal. Growing to 30 cm (12 in) across, this species has a rounded pectoral fin disc with a pointed snout, and a wide band of dermal denticles over the back in adults. It closely resembles and is often confused for the much larger daisy stingray (F. margarita); both species are characterized by the presence of an enlarged, nacreous denticle in the middle of the back called a "pearl spine". The International Union for Conservation of Nature (IUCN) assesses the pearl stingray's conservation status as Near Threatened, but it is likely that most of the historically reported fishery catches of the daisy stingray were in fact of this species.

== Taxonomy and phylogeny ==
Prior to being described by Leonard Compagno and Tyson Roberts, in a 1984 paper for the Proceedings of the California Academy of Sciences, the pearl stingray was generally lumped together with the daisy stingray in scientific literature. However, its existence had been recognized since at least 1965. The specific epithet margaritella comes from the diminutive of the Latin word margarita, meaning "pearl", in reference to the smaller body and pearl spine sizes of this ray compared to the daisy stingray. The type specimen is a male 19 cm (7.5 in) across, from Mbode, Cameroon.

In appearance, the pearl stingray resembles the daisy stingray and the Niger stingray (Fontitrygon garouaensis), both also native to West Africa, suggesting that the three species are closely related. Lisa Rosenberger's 2001 phylogenetic analysis, based on morphology, found that the pearl stingray is the sister species of the sharpnose stingray (Maculabatis gerrardi), and that the two form a clade with the pale-edged stingray (Telatrygon zugei) and the smooth butterfly ray (Gymnura micrura). These results support the growing consensus that neither Dasyatis nor Himantura are monophyletic. The daisy and Niger stingrays were not included in the study.

== Distribution and habitat ==
The pearl stingray is found along the western coast of Africa, from Cape Blanc in Mauritania to Angola. This bottom-dwelling species inhabits shallow, coastal marine and brackish waters, and has been reported from lagoons and estuaries, including the mouth of the Congo River.

== Description ==
The pearl stingray has a moderately thin, oval-shaped pectoral fin disc about as long as wide. The narrow snout tapers to a point that protrudes somewhat from the disc. The eyes are immediately followed by the spiracles, which are of approximately equal size. There is a flap of skin between the nares with a weakly curved or lobed, fringed posterior margin; a pair of grooves run between this flap and the corners of the gently bow-shaped mouth. There are five papillae in a row across the floor of the mouth. There are 24–41 upper tooth rows and 34–50 lower tooth rows. The blunt, ridged teeth are arranged into pavements with a quincunx pattern; those of adult males are longer than those of females, but are not pointed. The pelvic fins are short and triangular with their tips projecting slightly beyond the disc margin.

The tail is broad and flattened at the base and becomes thin and whip-like past the (usually) single, slender stinging spine on the upper surface. Past the spine, there is a low dorsal keel and a well-developed ventral fin fold. There is a medium-sized oval pearl spine in the middle of the back; rays over 13–14 cm (5.1–5.5 in) across also gain a band of small, heart-shaped or flattened circular dermal denticles covering the median third of the disc, from between the eyes to the base of the tail. The tail is covered by small prickles behind the spine. It is a plain grayish brown above, and completely white below. The smallest West African stingray, this species grows to 30 cm (12 in) across and a weight of 1 kg (2.2 lb). The pearl stingray differs from the daisy stingray in being much smaller, and having a relatively smaller, oval pearl spine, more tooth rows, and fewer pectoral fin radials (113–127 versus 129–136).

== Biology and ecology ==
Little is known of the natural history of the pearl stingray. Like other stingrays, it is aplacental viviparous with females likely bearing litters of 1–3 pups. Sexual maturation occurs at a disc width of around 20 cm (7.9 in).

== Human interactions ==
Despite its small size, the pearl stingray is probably taken by "catch-all" commercial fisheries operating in coastal waters off Senegal, Ghana, Côte d'Ivoire, and elsewhere, using longlines, bottom trawls, and trammel nets. However, no specific utilization data is available as it was and continues to be combined with the daisy stingray in catch records. The International Union for Conservation of Nature (IUCN) has listed this species as Near Threatened. Given that the pearl stingray was once (and may still be) much more abundant than the daisy stingray, it likely comprised a majority of historically reported "daisy stingray" catches.
