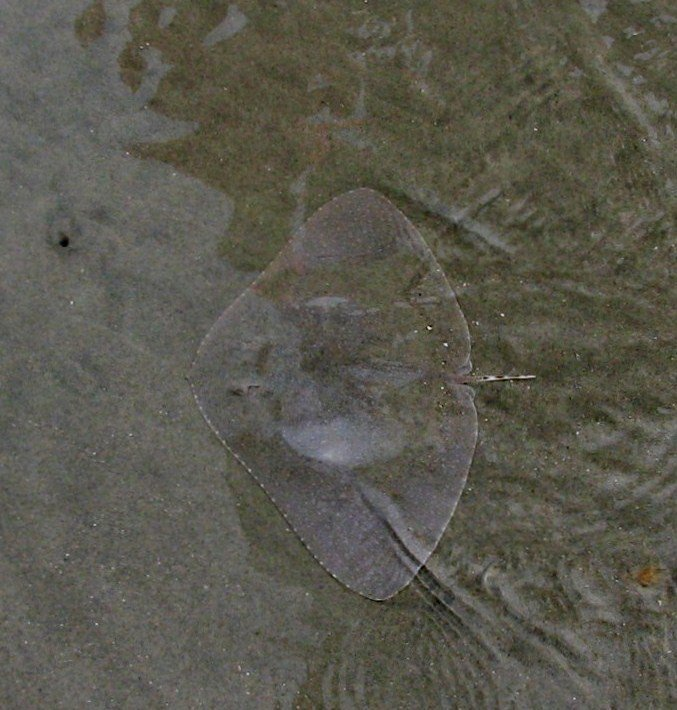

Conservation status
- Least Concern (IUCN 3.1)

Scientific classification
- Kingdom: Animalia
- Phylum: Chordata
- Class: Chondrichthyes
- Subclass: Elasmobranchii
- Order: Myliobatiformes
- Family: Gymnuridae
- Genus: Gymnura
- Species: G. lessae

Binomial name
- Gymnura lessae Yokota & Carvalho, 2017

= Gymnura lessae =

Species of butterfly ray (Gymnura)

Gymnura lessae, or Lessa's butterfly ray, is a cartilaginous fish (batoid) species of butterfly ray (Gymnura). Native to the coastlines stretching from Massachusetts, US to the Gulf of Mexico and the Caribbean. It is named after Rosângela Lessa, a prominent figure in shark and ray conservation.

Initially, G. lessae was thought to be the same species as Gymnura micrura, however and primarily because of internal morphological differences, Gymnura lessae was redescribed as a new species.

== Distribution and habitat ==
Gymnura Lessae is found on a long stretch of the eastern side of the US from Rhode Island to the Gulf of Mexico including Louisiana and Texas, US and Tamaulipas to Campeche, Mexico. They occupy neritic environments, prefer sandy and muddy bottoms and reach a depth of up to 60 m (200 ft).

== Dietary habits ==
Gymnura lessae is a specialized teleost feeder who primarily eats drumfish and anchovies. They tend to hide and sneak, and stun their prey with their pectoral fins.

Variation in feeding pattern exists, largely driven by sex differences and seasonal changes. Sex driven variation is due to size and seasonal changes primarily the result of differing prey communities. Females are much larger at maturity, hence tend to eat larger prey.

== Reproduction and growth ==
Gymnura lessae is a viviparous sexually dimorphic fish. Females are larger (disc width(DW):460 mm (18 in)) than males (DW:340 mm (13 in)), however the latter reaches sexual maturity faster; although both exhibit rapid growth and high fertility. This makes G. lessae resistant to exploitation putting it as both a stable population and a least concern species as compared to many other rays that face threats of extinction.

== Morphology ==
Like many butterfly rays, G. lessae exhibits a diamond shape flat body, wide disk, and a short tail. The external morphology such as color vary between the posterior and anterior sides of the body but also between members of the species and across species of Gymnuridae. The posterior side is darker in tone and exhibits radial like projections apparent at the beginning of the wings and a much lighter tone in the anterior side. Other distinguishing characteristics of G. lessae from other Gymnuridae, especially Gymnura micrura include pectoral girdle and hyomandibula cartilage variation.

The overall size and physiology of brain at maturity is smaller and simpler in G. lessae than in other batoids. The cerebellum exhibits less surface area to volume due to the reduction in foliation. The positioning of some of the cranial nerves is given in this table:

Nerve (#)	Origin	Position with respect to a reference frame
Olfactory (I)	Telencephalon (T)	anterior to cerebrum
Optic (II)	Border between T and Diencephalon (D)	projects anterolateral to T/D border
Oculomotor (III)	Medial of D	projects anterolaterally to D
Trochlear (IV)	Lateral D	Projects laterally to D
Trigeminal (V)	Laterally to Medulla Oblongata (MO)	Projects laterally to MO
Abducens (VI)	Anteriorly to MO	Projects laterally to MO
Facial (VII)	Laterally to MO	Projects laterally to MO
Acoustic (VIII)	Laterally to MO	Projects laterally to MO
Glossopharyngeal (IX)	anteriorly to MO	Projects laterally to MO
Vagus (X)	Lateral border of MO	Projects laterally to MO
Accessory (XI)	?	?
Hypoglossal (XII)	?	?

== IUCN classification and human interactions ==
Under the IUCN model 3.1, G. lessae is considered a species with a stable population and no observed decline as of 2019, therefore was considered a least concern species. The species is considered harmless to humans. It isn't commercially targeted in the US however, it is consumed in some local communities.
