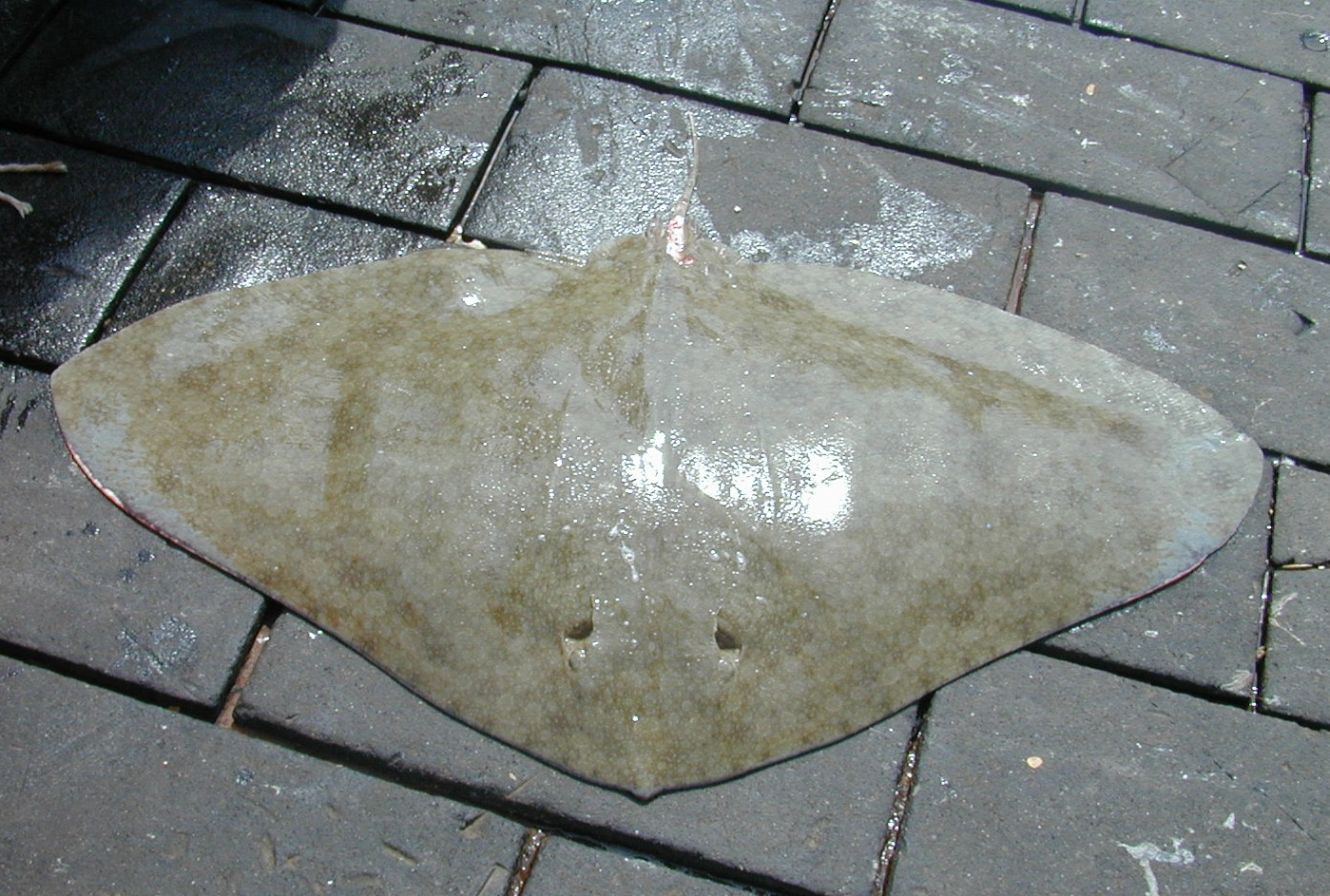

Conservation status
- Endangered (IUCN 3.1)

Scientific classification
- Kingdom: Animalia
- Phylum: Chordata
- Class: Chondrichthyes
- Subclass: Elasmobranchii
- Order: Myliobatiformes
- Family: Gymnuridae
- Genus: Gymnura
- Species: G. altavela

Binomial name
- Gymnura altavela (Linnaeus, 1758)
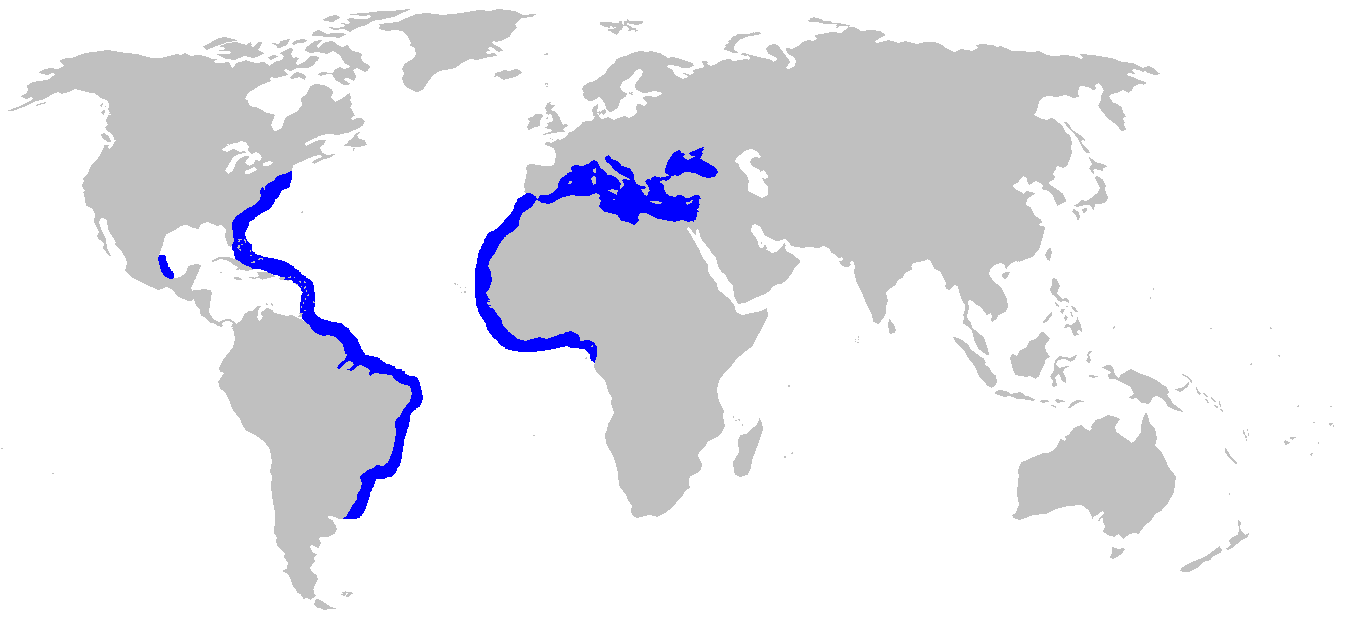
- Range of the spiny butterfly ray

Synonyms
- Pteroplatea binotata Lunel, 1879; Pteroplatea canariensis Valenciennes, 1843; Pteroplatea vaillantii Rochebrune, 1880; Pteroplatea valenciennii Duméril, 1865; Raja altavela Linnaeus, 1758; Raja maclura Lesueur, 1817

= Spiny butterfly ray =

Species of cartilaginous fish

The spiny butterfly ray or giant butterfly ray (Gymnura altavela) is a species of butterfly ray, family Gymnuridae, native to the shallow coastal waters of the Atlantic Ocean. A large ray that can measure over 2 m (6 ft 7 in) across, it may be distinguished from the sympatric smooth butterfly ray (G. micrura) by the spine at the base of its tail and by a small tentacular structure on the margin of each spiracle. Slow-reproducing and valued for its meat, in recent decades its population has experienced a decline of over 30%, and it has become Critically Endangered in certain parts of its range.

== Distribution and habitat ==
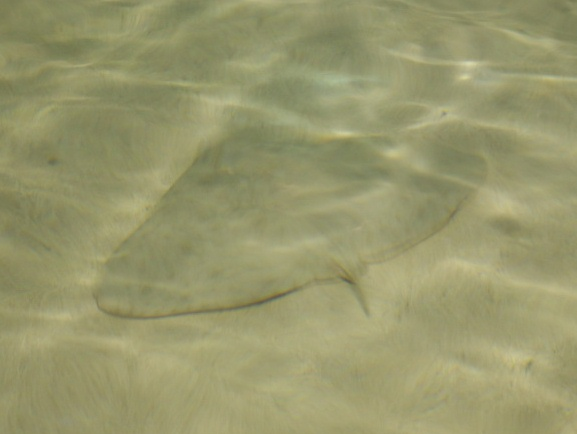
Spiny butterfly rays prefer sandy habitat

This species has a patchy and discontinuous distribution in Atlantic tropical and warm-temperate waters. In the western Atlantic it is found from Massachusetts, United States to Buenos Aires Province, Argentina; it is rare in the Gulf of Mexico and common in the mouths of tidal creeks along the Virginia coast. In the eastern Atlantic, it is found from Portugal to Angola, including Madeira and the Canary Islands. It is also recorded in the Mediterranean and Black Seas. It is found in shallow brackish and coastal waters over soft sandy or muddy substrates, at a depth of 5–100 m (16–328 ft). This ray is uncommon overall but can be locally abundant in suitable habitat. Individuals may segregate by sex, with females usually staying in deeper water but moving inshore to breed.

== Description ==
The spiny butterfly ray has a very broad, lozenge-shaped pectoral fin disk much wider than it is long, with concave front margins and abruptly rounded corners. The snout is short and blunt. The teeth have high, conical cusps, numbering 98–138 rows in the upper jaw and 78–110 rows in the lower jaw. In both jaws there are 10–12 functional tooth rows with each dental band occupying 70% the width of the jaw. There is a tentacle-like structure on the inner posterior margin of each spiracle. The tail is short and slender, measuring a quarter the disk width, with upper and lower fin folds. There are one or more serrated spines at the base of the tail.

The skin is naked in juveniles and subadults, while adults develop a patch of denticles on the center of the disk. The coloration is dark brown above, sometimes with small lighter or darker spots and blotches in a marbled pattern, and white below. Juveniles have pale crossbars on the tail. The maximum reported size is 2.2 m (7 ft 3 in) disk width in the northwest Atlantic, though there are unsubstantiated reports of rays over 4 m (13 ft) off West Africa. The maximum published weight is 60 kg (130 lb).

== Biology and ecology ==
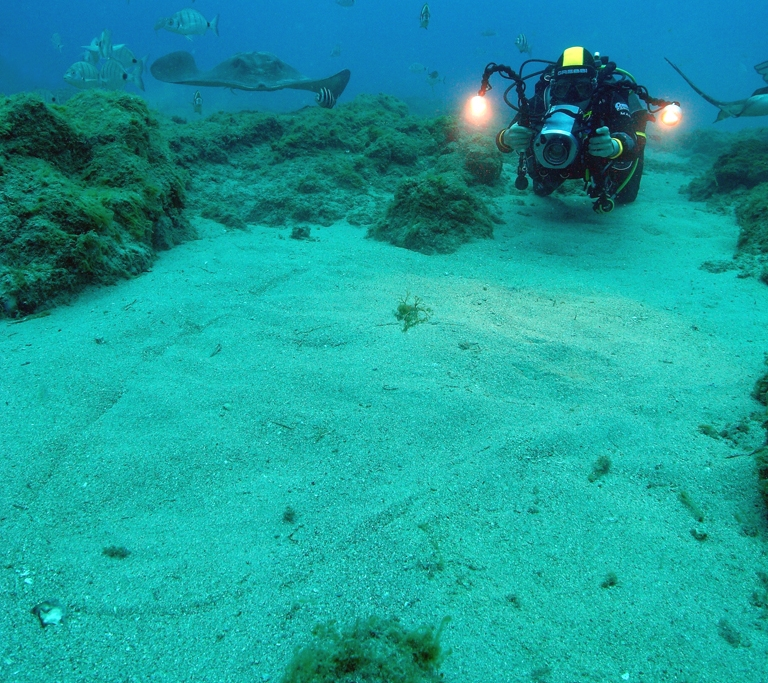
Spiny butterfly ray buried in sand

In the western Atlantic, the spiny butterfly ray feeds on fishes, including Leiognathus and small sharks, and squids. Off Tunisia, they feed on crustaceans, teleosts, cephalopods, lamellibranchs, and gastropods, in descending order of importance. Teleost fishes apparently become more important in the ray's diet with increasing size. An active predator, the ray typically approaches a prey item slowly before rapidly spinning around over it and striking the food with the leading edge of one of their pectoral fins. This behavior likely serves to stun the prey before capture, as the pectoral fins of butterfly rays contain a high proportion of red muscle and can deliver blows of substantial force.

Potential predators of spiny butterfly rays include larger fish such as the great hammerhead (Sphyrna mokarran), and marine mammals. In the northwest Atlantic, the depletion of seven large shark species by commercial fisheries has led to an increase in the population of the spiny butterfly ray and other mid-level predators. Known parasites of this species include the tapeworms Anthobothrium altavelae and Pterobothrioides petterae, and the gill parasite Heteronchocotyle gymnurae.

Spiny butterfly rays are ovoviviparous and give birth to live young. They have an annual reproductive cycle with a gestation period of 4 to 9 months. The embryos initially subsist on a yolk sac; later in development long villi develop from the uterine wall into the embryos' spiracles, which direct uterine milk into the oral cavity. Litter size is up to 8, depending on geographical location: 4 per litter in the Gulf of Mexico, 1–6 in the Mediterranean, up to 5 off Brazil, and up to 8 in the northwest Atlantic. Females have one functional ovary (the left) and two functional uteruses, with the embryos evenly distributed in each one. The newborns measure 38–44 cm (15–17 in) across; their size is inversely related to the number of young in each uterus. In the eastern Atlantic, males mature at around 78 cm (31 in) across and females at 108 cm (43 in). In the western Atlantic, males mature at around 102 cm (40 in) across and females at 155 cm (61 in). Females mature later than males and reach a larger size.

== Relationship to humans ==
If stepped on, the ray's tail spine can cause a painful wound. It is listed as a game fish in some regions. The meat of this species is highly regarded and it is caught for human consumption, except for in the waters off the United States where it is not targeted by commercial fisheries and is rarely taken as bycatch. It is assessed as Endangered by the World Conservation Union.

Elsewhere in the spiny butterfly ray's range, it faces heavy fishing pressure, including in its coastal nursery areas, and has experienced marked declines. It is assessed as Critically Endangered in the southwest Atlantic, where it is taken by multispecies trawls, beach-seines, and recreational fishers. Off southern Brazil, catch rates have declined by 99% since 1982, due to fishing occurring year-round. This species is also Critically Endangered in the Mediterranean, where it is now rare or absent throughout its entire former range, especially along the southern shore such as off Sicily. The comprehensive Mediterranean International Trawl Surveys (MITS) since 1994 have failed to recover any specimens, indicating a massive decline in numbers. In West Africa, this species is assessed as Vulnerable; it is taken intentionally or incidentally by gillnets, shrimp trawls, longlines, and handlines. Reports from artisan fishers and other observers from Mauritania to Guinea have reported a severe drop in abundance, as well as decreasing median size as the adults are removed.
