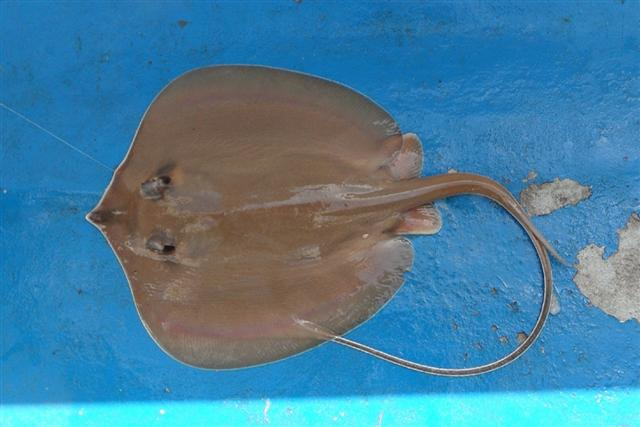

Conservation status
- Vulnerable (IUCN 3.1)

Scientific classification
- Kingdom: Animalia
- Phylum: Chordata
- Class: Chondrichthyes
- Subclass: Elasmobranchii
- Order: Myliobatiformes
- Family: Dasyatidae
- Genus: Fontitrygon
- Species: F. margarita

Binomial name
- Fontitrygon margarita (Günther, 1870)

Synonyms
- Trygon margarita Günther, 1870; Dasyatis margarita (Günther, 1870)

= Daisy stingray =

Species of cartilaginous fish

The daisy stingray, Fontitrygon margarita, is a little-known species of stingray in the family Dasyatidae, found in shallow waters along the coast of West Africa. This species typically grows to 60 cm (24 in) across and has a rounded pectoral fin disc and (in adults) a wide band of dermal denticles over its back. It is characterized by a greatly enlarged, nacreous denticle in the middle of its back called a "pearl spine"; this feature is shared with the similar but much smaller pearl stingray (F. margaritella), which has often been confused with this species. The daisy stingray feeds mainly on crustaceans and exhibits aplacental viviparity, with litters of 1–4 young. Heavily pressured by fisheries and possibly habitat degradation, this once-common species is declining and has been assessed as Vulnerable by the International Union for Conservation of Nature (IUCN).

== Taxonomy ==
British zoologist Albert Günther originally described the daisy stingray as Trygon margarita, in his 1870 Catalogue of the Fishes in the British Museum; subsequent authors synonymized the genus Trygon with Dasyatis. This species resembles, and is likely closely related to, the pearl stingray and the Niger stingray (D. garouaensis), both also native to West Africa. Numerous scientific accounts of the daisy stingray have been confounded by confusion with the pearl stingray; this confusion dates back to the two West African specimens referenced in Günther's original description. In 1984, Leonard Compagno and Tyson Roberts identified one of them as a pearl stingray and designated the other as the lectotype for this species. The specific epithet margarita is derived from the Latin for "pearl", referring to the large tubercle on its back.

== Distribution and habitat ==
The known range of the daisy stingray extends from Senegal to the Democratic Republic of the Congo; records of it occurring as far as Mauritania and Angola may have been mistakenly based on the pearl stingray. This bottom-dwelling species is found in marine and brackish waters with a salinity of 20–40 ppt. It favors sandy habitats in shallow coastal waters to a depth of 60 m (200 ft), though most are found between 11 and 20 m (36 and 66 ft). This ray also reportedly frequents lagoons and estuaries; however, this also requires confirmation due to confusion with the pearl stingray.

== Description ==
The pectoral fin disc of the daisy stingray is moderately thin and rounded, measuring about as wide as long. The leading margins of the disc are concave and converge at the pointed, slightly projecting tip of the snout. The eyes are medium-sized and followed by somewhat larger spiracles. There is a curtain of skin between the nares, with a fringed, subtly tri-lobed posterior margin; a pair of shallow grooves run from the skin flap to the corners of the bow-shaped mouth. There are 5 papillae in a transverse row across the floor of the mouth, with the outermost pair set apart from the others. The tooth rows number 24–32 in the upper jaw and 28–36 rows in the lower jaw, and are arranged with a quincunx pattern into pavement-like surfaces. The pelvic fins are short, with the tips projecting just past the disc margin.

The tail is longer than the disc and usually bears a single long, thin stinging spine on the upper surface. The tail is broad and flattened at the base, becoming slender and whip-like past the spine with a low dorsal keel and a well-developed ventral fin fold. There is a massive, circular pearl spine at the center of the disc. Young rays are otherwise smooth-skinned, while older rays over 20 cm (7.9 in) across gain a wide band of small, flattened, circular dermal denticles covering the median third of the back from between the eyes to the base of the tail, as well as small prickles covering the tail behind the sting. This ray is a plain grayish brown above, and whitish below. It reaches a maximum known disc width of 1 m (3.3 ft) and weight of 17 kg (37 lb), though most do not exceed a width of 60 cm (24 in). Females grow larger than males. Apart from being much larger, the daisy stingray can also be distinguished from the pearl stingray in having a relatively larger, round pearl spine, fewer tooth rows, and more pectoral fin radials (129–136 versus 113–127).

== Biology and ecology ==
Little is known of the natural history of the daisy stingray. It feeds mainly on shrimp, crabs, bivalves, and annelid worms. Off Nigeria, some three-quarters of its diet consists of the shrimp Farfantepenaeus duorarum. Like other stingrays, this species is aplacental viviparous. Females bear litters of 1–4 pups, with coastal lagoons and estuaries serving as a breeding ground. Reproductive activity peaks during the rainy season from April to September, likely to correspond to high abundances of prey species.

== Human interactions ==
The tail spine of the daisy stingray is reportedly highly venomous and potentially injurious to humans. The daisy stingray is caught by intensive artisanal and small-scale commercial fisheries occurring off the coasts of Senegal, Ghana, and Côte d'Ivoire, and sold fresh, smoked, or dried and salted for human consumption. A wide variety of fishing gear is used, including longlines, bottom trawls, trammel nets, gillnets, traps, beach seines, and hook-and-line. Habitat degradation from agricultural runoff and industrial development may also threaten its population. Once common, catches of this slow-reproducing ray have become scarce in recent years, leading the International Union for Conservation of Nature (IUCN) to assess it as Vulnerable. The daisy stingray has not yet been the target of any specific conservation schemes.
