= Gymnura crebripunctata =

Conservation status
- Near Threatened (IUCN 3.1)

Scientific classification
- Kingdom: Animalia
- Phylum: Chordata
- Class: Chondrichthyes
- Subclass: Elasmobranchii
- Order: Myliobatiformes
- Family: Gymnuridae
- Genus: Gymnura
- Species: G. crebripunctata

Binomial name
- Gymnura crebripunctata Peters, 1869

Species of cartilaginous fish

Gymnura crebripunctata

Gymnura crebripunctata, the longsnout butterfly ray, is a type of marine tropical ray mainly found in Eastern Central Pacific.

== Description ==
Little is known about this species biology, except it is known to reproduce ovoviviparously and might reach a maximum size of 31 cm (12 in) for mature male specimens.

== Habitat and distribution ==
This ray inhabits the muddy substrates, lagoons, estuaries, and coastal regions from Gulf of California to Peru. It lives at a maximum depth of 30 m (98 ft). It is also often caught accidentally by artisanal fisheries and trawlers operating around Gulf of California.
