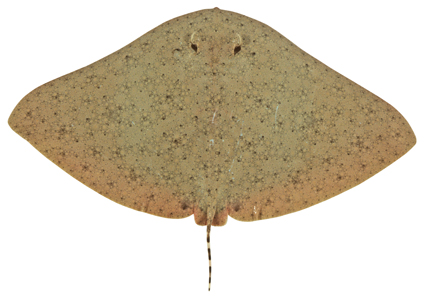

Conservation status
- Least Concern (IUCN 3.1)

Scientific classification
- Kingdom: Animalia
- Phylum: Chordata
- Class: Chondrichthyes
- Subclass: Elasmobranchii
- Order: Myliobatiformes
- Family: Gymnuridae
- Genus: Gymnura
- Species: G. australis

Binomial name
- Gymnura australis (Ramsay & Ogilby, 1886)

Synonyms
- Pteroplatea australis Ramsay & Ogilby, 1886

= Australian butterfly ray =

Species of cartilaginous fish

The Australian butterfly ray (Gymnura australis) is a species of butterfly ray, family Gymnuridae.
