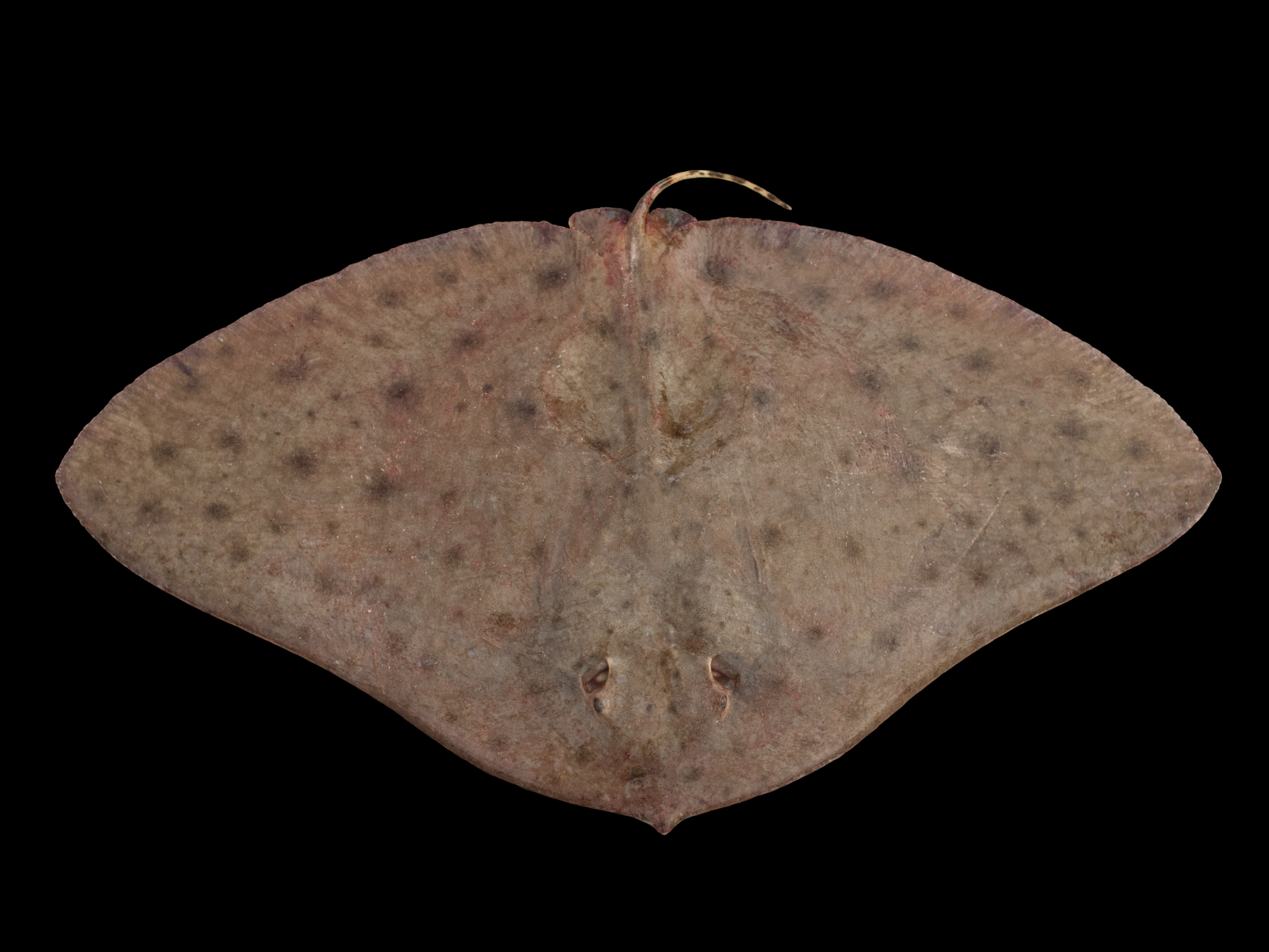
- Smooth butterfly ray (G. micrura)

Scientific classification
- Kingdom: Animalia
- Phylum: Chordata
- Class: Chondrichthyes
- Subclass: Elasmobranchii
- Division: Batomorphi
- Order: Myliobatiformes
- Family: Gymnuridae; Fowler, 1934
- Genus: Gymnura van Hasselt, 1823

Type species
- Gymnura micrura Bloch & Schneider, 1801

Synonyms
- Aetoplatea Valenciennes in J. P. Müller & Henle, 1841; Dasyatis Gray, 1851; Phanerocephalus Gratzianov, 1906; Pteroplatea J. P. Müller & Henle, 1837

= Butterfly ray =

Butterfly rays Temporal range: Late Paleocene–present

Genus of cartilaginous fishes

The butterfly rays are the rays forming the genus Gymnura and the family Gymnuridae. They are found in warm oceans worldwide, and occasionally in estuaries.

The body of butterfly rays is flattened and surrounded by an extremely broad disc formed by the pectoral fins, which merge in front of the head. They have a very short, thread-like, tail. They are up to 4 m (13 ft) in width.

McEachran et al. (1996) place the butterfly rays in the subfamily Gymnurinae of the family Dasyatidae, but this article follows FishBase and ITIS in treating them as a family.

== Species ==
There are currently 14 species in this genus (others are considered synonyms):

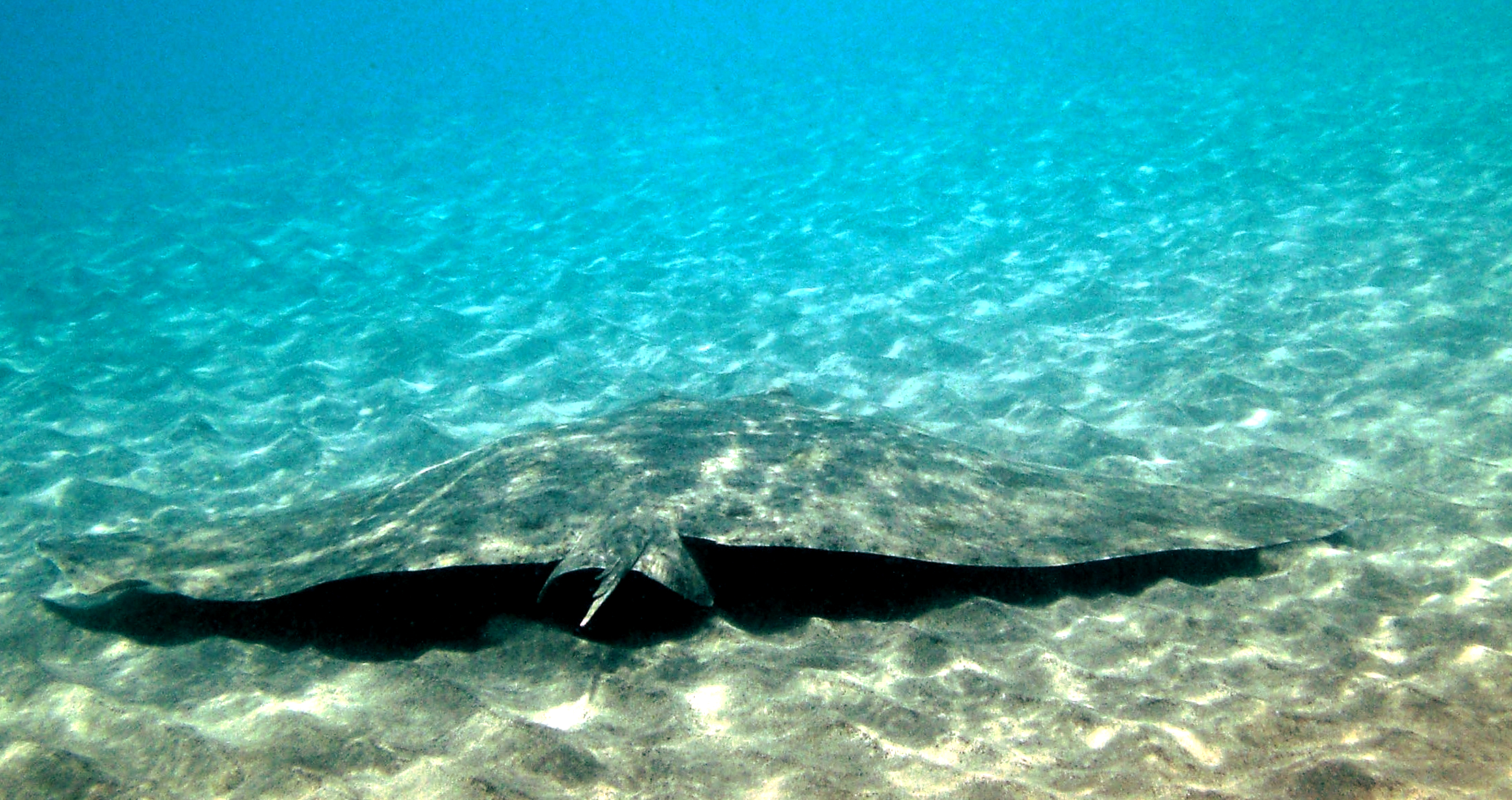
Spiny butterfly ray (Gymnura altavela)

- Gymnura afuerae (Hildebrand, 1946)
- Gymnura altavela (Linnaeus, 1758) – Spiny butterfly ray
- Gymnura australis (E. P. Ramsay & Ogilby, 1886) – Australian butterfly ray
- Gymnura crebripunctata (W. K. H. Peters, 1869) – Longsnout butterfly ray
- Gymnura hirundo (Lowe, 1843) – Madeira butterfly ray
- Gymnura japonica (Temminck & Schlegel, 1850) – Japanese butterfly ray
- Gymnura lessae (Yokota & Carvalho, 2017) – Lessa's butterfly ray
- Gymnura marmorata (J. G. Cooper, 1864) – California butterfly ray
- Gymnura micrura (Bloch & J. G. Schneider, 1801) – Smooth butterfly ray
- Gymnura natalensis (Gilchrist & W. W. Thompson, 1911) – Backwater butterfly ray
- Gymnura poecilura (G. Shaw, 1804) – Longtail butterfly ray
- Gymnura sereti (Yokota & Carvalho, 2017) – Seret's butterfly ray
- Gymnura tentaculata (J. P. Müller & Henle, 1841) – Tentacled butterfly ray
- Gymnura zonura (Bleeker, 1852) – Zonetail butterfly ray

Synonyms

- Gymnura bimaculata (Norman, 1925) - synonym of Gymnura japonica
- Gymnura crooki Fowler, 1934 - synonym of Gymnura poecilura

=== Fossil taxa ===
The following fossil gymnurid genera are known:

- †Subathunura Kumar & Loyal, 1987 (Eocene of India)
- †Jacquhermania Cappetta, 1982 (Middle to Late Eocene of Europe and eastern North America)
- †Ouledia Cappetta, 1986 (Late Paleocene to Middle Eocene of North Africa, South America and South Asia)
- †Pachygymnura Adnet et al., 2020 (Late Eocene of Egypt)

The following fossil species of Gymnura are also known:

- †Gymnura delpiti Cappetta, 1984 (Late Paleocene of Morocco)
- †Gymnura grootaerti Herman, 1984 (Early Eocene of Belgium)
- †Gymnura hovestadti Herman, 1984 (Early Oligocene of Belgium)
- †Gymnura laterialata Werner, 1989 (Cenomanian of Egypt)
- †Gymnura transita Averianov & Udovitshenko, 1993 (Early Eocene of Kyrgyzstan)

== Diet ==
These species commonly prey on fish, crustaceans and mollusks.
