= Pincushion ray =

Conservation status
- Critically Endangered (IUCN 3.1)

Scientific classification
- Kingdom: Animalia
- Phylum: Chordata
- Class: Chondrichthyes
- Subclass: Elasmobranchii
- Order: Myliobatiformes
- Family: Dasyatidae
- Genus: Fontitrygon
- Species: F. ukpam

Binomial name
- Fontitrygon ukpam (J. A. Smith, 1863)

Synonyms
- Dasyatis ukpam (Smith, 1863); Hemitrygon ukpam Smith, 1863; Trygon ukpam (Smith, 1863); Urogymnus ukpam (Smith, 1863)

Species of cartilaginous fish

The pincushion ray or thorny freshwater stingray (Fontitrygon ukpam), is a little-known species of stingray in the family Dasyatidae, found in the rivers and lakes of West and Middle Africa. A heavy-bodied ray measuring up to 1.2 m (4 ft) across, this species can be distinguished by its rounded pectoral fin disk, reduced or absent stinging tail spine, and—in adults—numerous stout thorns covering its back and tail. In lieu of a long tail spine as in other stingrays, the pincushion ray employs these thorny denticles in defense. Seldom encountered since it was originally described, this species has been assessed as Critically Endangered by the International Union for Conservation of Nature (IUCN).

== Taxonomy ==
John Alexander Smith scientifically described the pincushion ray in 1863, in Proceedings of the Royal Physical Society of Edinburgh. He named it ukpam, as that is the local indigenous name for freshwater stingrays. Because he saw the single, reduced tail spine of this ray as an intermediate condition between Urogymnus, which is spineless, and Trygon (=Dasyatis), which has one or more spines, Smith coined the genus Hemitrygon (from the Greek hemi meaning "half") for this species. Subsequent authors have regarded it as either a member of Dasyatis or Urogymnus.

== Distribution and habitat ==
One of only two freshwater stingrays in Africa (the other being the Niger stingray, F. garouaensis), the pincushion ray has been reported from the Old Calabar River in Nigeria, the Sanaga River in Cameroon, Lake Ezanga and the Ogooué River in Gabon, and the Congo River near Binda in the Democratic Republic of the Congo. Smith's original account also described this species as occurring in brackish water at the mouth of the Old Calabar, but if the pincushion ray is euryhaline this has yet to be corroborated by modern records. If it is capable of tolerating higher salinities, then it may be able to move between different river systems via coastal waters.

== Description ==
The pincushion ray has a slightly projecting snout and an oval, very thick pectoral fin disk somewhat longer than wide, containing 142–148 internal rays on either side. The eyes are large, with a projection on the upper eyelid, and are followed by prominent spiracles. The mouth is slightly arched and contains many close-set, rounded teeth, numbering 38–40 rows in the upper jaw and 38–48 in the lower jaw. There are five papillae on the floor of the mouth. The pelvic fins are rounded and their inner margins are fused together. The tail is whip-like with a narrow fin fold underneath, measuring some three times longer than the body in juveniles and becoming relatively shorter with age. Some individuals have a small grooved spine on the upper side of the tail near the base; when present the spine averages 5.6 cm (2.2 in) long in males and 4.6 cm (1.8 in) long in females. The spines of young rays are smooth and covered by a membrane, while those of adults are exposed with around 46 serrations.

Newborn pincushion rays have smooth skin; older fish develop numerous large, thorny dermal denticles over the upper surface of the body and tail. The dorsal coloration is uniform dark brown or gray-brown, and the tail is nearly black past the base. The underside is white with a broad dark edge around the margin of the disk. This species grows to a large size; Smith recorded specimens measuring 1.2 m (4 ft) across and 3 m (10 ft) long, which required four men to lift.

== Biology and ecology ==
According to Smith's original account, the pincushion ray defends itself by striking with its thorn-covered tail, inflicting "severe and even dangerous wounds". Its diet is said to consist mainly of small eels. Like other stingrays, this species is aplacental viviparous, with a report of a female gestating two offspring. One recorded female 45.2 cm (17.8 in) across, from the Sanaga River, was reproductively immature.

== Human interactions ==
During the 19th century, the pincushion ray reportedly occurred with "considerable abundance" in the Old Calabar River. However, in modern times it is represented by fewer than 10 museum specimens and a handful of additional specimens recently caught from Gabon. Given that it lives in a heavily populated region, this species may have been over-exploited by intensive artisan fishing; Smith noted that it was considered to be a "great delicacy" by the locals, and hunted with barbed spears. The pincushion ray may also be affected by habitat degradation. The rarity of this species, and the substantial threats it may face, has led the International Union for Conservation of Nature (IUCN) to assess it as Critically Endangered.
