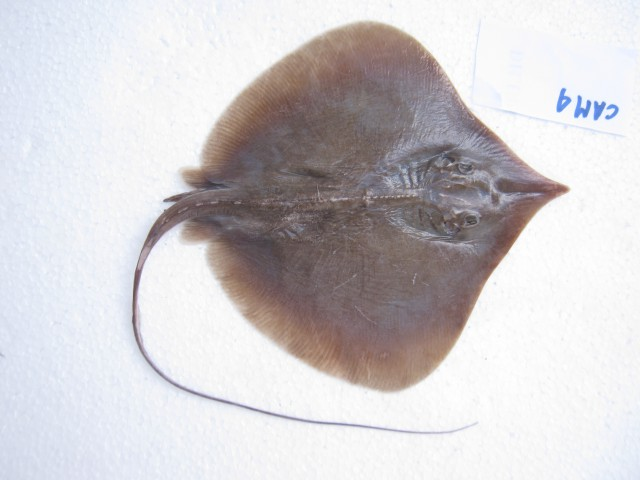
- T. zugei

Scientific classification
- Kingdom: Animalia
- Phylum: Chordata
- Class: Chondrichthyes
- Subclass: Elasmobranchii
- Order: Myliobatiformes
- Family: Dasyatidae
- Subfamily: Dasyatinae
- Genus: Telatrygon; Last, Naylor & Manjaji-Matsumoto, 2016

Type species
- Trygon zugei Müller & Henle, 1841

= Telatrygon =

Genus of cartilaginous fishes

Telatrygon is a genus of stingrays in the family Dasyatidae from the central Indo-Pacific. Its species were formerly contained within the genus Dasyatis.

== Species ==
The placement of T. acutirostra within the genus is provisional pending further study.

- Telatrygon acutirostra (Nishida & Nakaya, 1988) (sharpnose stingray)
- Telatrygon biasa Last, White & Naylor, 2016 (Indonesian sharpnose ray)
- Telatrygon crozieri (Blyth, 1860) (Indian sharpnose ray)
- Telatrygon zugei (Müller & Henle, 1841) (pale-edged stingray)
