= Telatrygon biasa =

Conservation status
- Vulnerable (IUCN 3.1)

Scientific classification
- Kingdom: Animalia
- Phylum: Chordata
- Class: Chondrichthyes
- Subclass: Elasmobranchii
- Order: Myliobatiformes
- Family: Dasyatidae
- Genus: Telatrygon
- Species: T. biasa

Binomial name
- Telatrygon biasa Last, W. T. White, & Naylor, 2016

Species of fish

Telatrygon biasa, the Indonesian sharpnose ray, is a type of whiptail stingray identified from many reported specimens in the Indo-Malay Archipelago (including Indonesia, Malaysia, Singapore, Brunei, and Thailand). It inhabits shallow coastal region up to approximately 40 meters depth. It is currently experiencing population decrease due to being captured by small-scale local fisheries and retained as human consumption.

== Etymology ==
The fish's name is an Indonesian and Malaysian word meaning “ordinary, common or normal,” referring to its frequent occurrence in the local fish markets of the western North Pacific

== Description ==
This sharpnose ray has several characteristics, including relatively short snout and disc, small eyes, 107-114 pectoral radials, and 85-94 vertebral centra in total. It can reach the maximum size of 29 cm disc width, while the birth size is around 7-9 cm disc width.

== Habitat and distribution ==
This demersal species is found living at the depths of up to 40 m in the coastal regions of Indonesia (Sumatra, Java, Borneo, and Bali), Malaysia (Malay Peninsula, Sabah, and Sarawak), Singapore, Brunei Darussalam, and Thailand.

Indonesian sharpnose rays are often caught by local or national fisheries as fresh or salted seafood delicacies for local communities. Its species name "biasa", meaning "ordinary" in Malay and Indonesian, might suggest that this ray is commonly consumed and found in local fish markets.
