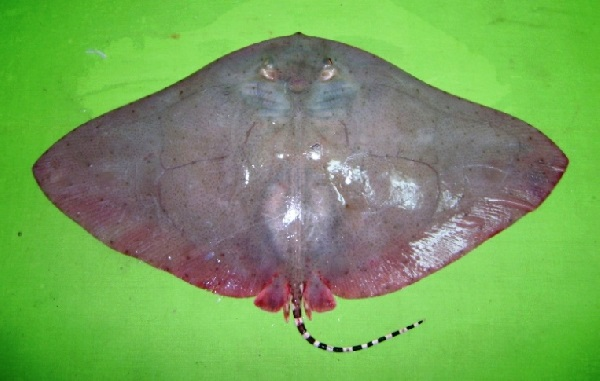

Conservation status
- Vulnerable (IUCN 3.1)

Scientific classification
- Kingdom: Animalia
- Phylum: Chordata
- Class: Chondrichthyes
- Subclass: Elasmobranchii
- Order: Myliobatiformes
- Family: Gymnuridae
- Genus: Gymnura
- Species: G. poecilura

Binomial name
- Gymnura poecilura (G. Shaw, 1804)
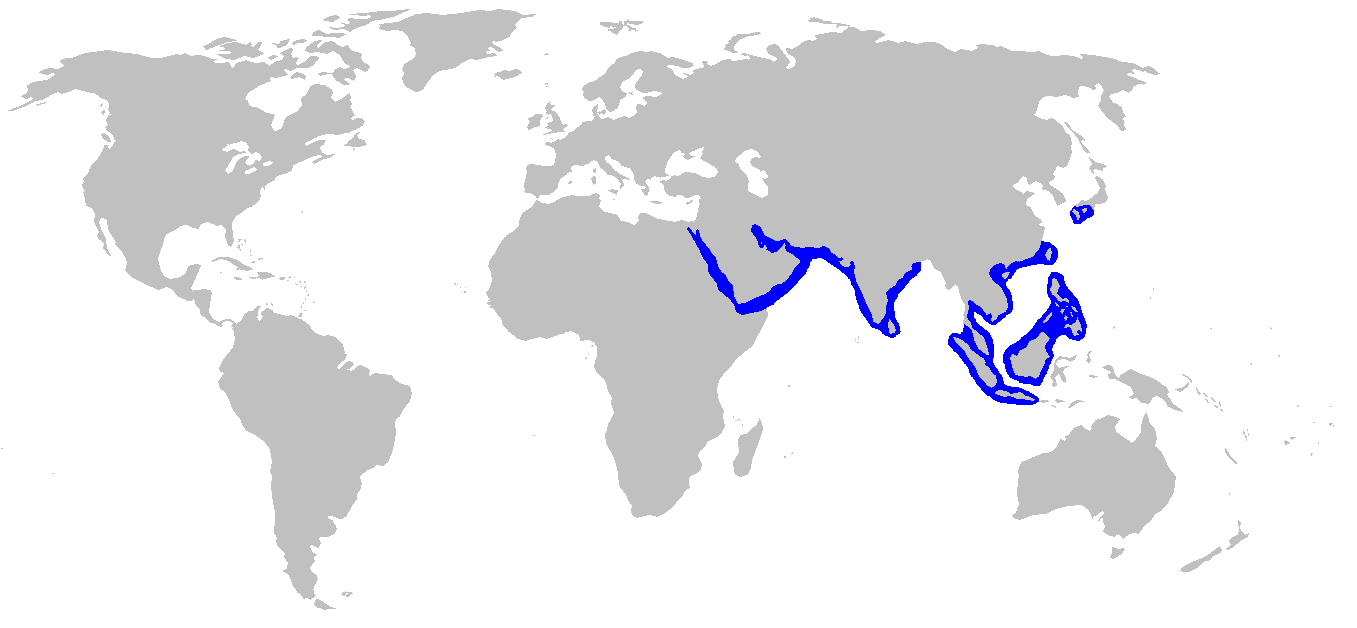
- Range of the longtail butterfly ray

Synonyms
- Pastinaca kunsa Cuvier, 1829; Pteroplatea annulata Swainson, 1839; Raja poecilura Shaw, 1804

= Longtail butterfly ray =

Species of cartilaginous fish

The longtail butterfly ray (Gymnura poecilura) is a species of butterfly ray, family Gymnuridae, native to the Indo-Pacific from the Red Sea to southern Japan and western Indonesia. Growing up to 92 cm (36 in) across, this ray has a lozenge-shaped pectoral fin disc about twice as wide as long, colored brown to gray above with many small, light spots. The spiracles behind its eyes have smooth rims. This species can be identified by its tail, which is about as long as the snout-to-vent distance, lacks fins, and bears nine to twelve each of alternating black and white bands.

Bottom-dwelling in nature, the longtail butterfly ray frequents sandy or muddy habitats in coastal waters shallower than 30 m (98 ft). Its diet consists of bony fishes, molluscs, and crustaceans. This species gives birth to live young; the developing embryos are nourished first by yolk and later by histotroph ("uterine milk") supplied by its mother. There is no defined breeding season, and females bear litters of up to seven pups. Used for its meat, the longtail butterfly ray is often caught by artisanal and commercial fisheries.

== Taxonomy and phylogeny ==
The longtail butterfly ray was originally described as Raja poecilura by English zoologist George Shaw, in his 1804 General Zoology or Systematic Natural History. He did not designate a type specimen as his account was based on an illustration by Scottish naturalist Patrick Russell, published a year earlier in Descriptions and Figures of Two Hundred Fishes Collected at Vizagapatam on the Coast of Coromandel. The specific epithet poecilura is derived from the Greek poikilos ("of many colors") and oura ("tail"). Later authors moved this species to the genus Gymnura.

Further research is needed to determine whether the isolated longtail butterfly rays in French Polynesia are in fact the same species as those from the rest of its range. Phylogenetic studies based on morphology and mitochondrial DNA indicate that the longtail butterfly ray is closely related to the zonetail butterfly ray (G. zonura), which shares much of its range in the Indo-Pacific. Another name for the longtail butterfly ray is variegated butterfly ray.

== Description ==
The pectoral fin disc of the longtail butterfly ray has the lozenge shape characteristic of its family, measuring around twice as wide as long. The leading margin of the disc is gently sinuous, the trailing margin is convex, and the outer corners are mildly angular. The snout is short and broad, with a tiny protruding tip. The medium-sized eyes have larger, smooth-rimmed spiracles behind. The nostrils are positioned close to the mouth; between them is a short and broad curtain of skin with a smooth margin. The large mouth forms a transverse curve and contains over 50 tooth rows in each jaw, increasing in number with age; the teeth are small, narrow, and pointed. There are five pairs of short gill slits on the underside of the disc. The pelvic fins are small and rounded.

The thread-like tail lacks dorsal or caudal fins, though there are low ridges along its length above and below. Its length is about equal to the distance between the snout tip and the vent, distinguishing this species from other butterfly rays that have shorter tails. Sometimes there is a small stinging spine (very rarely two) on the upper surface of the tail near the base. The skin is devoid of dermal denticles. This species is brown to greenish brown to gray above, with many small pale spots and sometimes also a smattering of dark dots. The tail has nine to twelve black bands alternating with white bands, which often have a small, dorsally positioned dark spot within. The underside is white, darkening at the edges of the fins. The longtail butterfly ray attains a maximum width of 92 cm (36 in).

== Distribution and habitat ==
The most widespread member of its family in the Indo-Pacific, the longtail butterfly ray is found from the Red Sea and Somalia, westward across India and Sri Lanka, to China and southern Japan, the Philippines, and the western islands of Indonesia (including Borneo, Sumatra, and Java). It has also been reported from French Polynesia (see taxonomic note above). It is fairly common in some areas. This bottom-dwelling species inhabits coastal waters at depths of 10–30 m (33–98 ft), preferring sandy or muddy bottoms. It does not appear to migrate seasonally.

== Biology and ecology ==
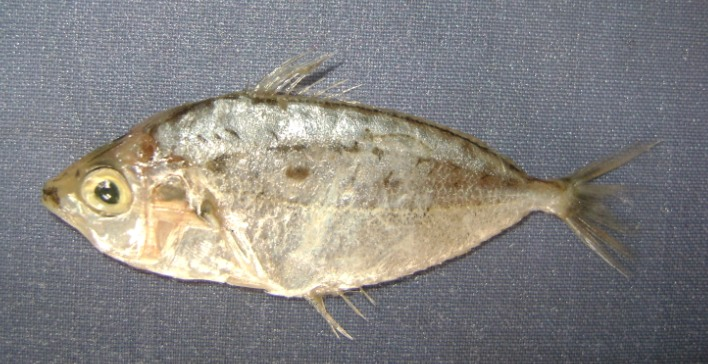
Ponyfishes (pictured: Leiognathus lineolatus) are preyed upon by the longtail butterfly ray.

The longtail butterfly ray feeds on bony fishes, in particular ponyfishes of the genus Leiognathus, as well as molluscs and crustaceans. It is not known to shoal in large numbers. Known parasites of this ray include the nematode Hysterothylacium poecilurai and the tapeworm Acanthobothrium micracantha. Like other butterfly rays, this species is viviparous with the young sustained initially by yolk, and later by histotroph ("uterine milk") produced by the mother. Adult females have two functional ovaries and uteruses. Reproductive activity proceeds throughout the year, with a peak from April to October. The gestation period is unknown, though it is possible that females bear more than one litter per year. The litter size is at least seven pups and is not correlated with female size. The newborns measure 20–26 cm (7.9–10.2 in) across and look like stingless miniatures of the adult; siblings may differ from each other in color. Males and females mature sexually at roughly 45 and 41 cm (18 and 16 in) across respectively.

== Human interactions ==
The longtail butterfly ray is widely caught for meat and as bycatch in artisanal and commercial fisheries, including in India, Thailand, and Indonesia. It is taken using bottom trawls, bottom-set gillnets, and to a lesser degree trammel nets and other fishing gear. Though specific population and catch data are lacking, the longtail butterfly ray is thought to be susceptible to overfishing due to its low reproductive rate and the fact that pregnant females often abort their young when captured. Given the high intensity of fishing pressure across most of its range, the International Union for Conservation of Nature (IUCN) has assessed this species as Vulnerable.
