= Telatrygon crozieri =

Conservation status
- Endangered (IUCN 3.1)

Scientific classification
- Kingdom: Animalia
- Phylum: Chordata
- Class: Chondrichthyes
- Subclass: Elasmobranchii
- Order: Myliobatiformes
- Family: Dasyatidae
- Genus: Telatrygon
- Species: T. crozieri

Binomial name
- Telatrygon crozieri Blyth, 1860

Species of cartilaginous fish

Telatrygon crozieri, the Indian sharpnose ray, is a type of tropical ray of the family Dasyatidae living in the coastal region of India and Bangladesh. It inhabits tropical continental shelf region at the maximum depth of 200 m (660 ft) and mostly feeds on benthic creatures. This ray is often caught as bycatch by local fisheries.

== Etymology ==
The fish is named in honor of British anatomy and physiology professor William Crozier (1816–1862), the describers colleague at the Asiatic Society of Bengal.

== Description ==
Not much was known about the biology, but the Indian sharpnose ray is believed to move to much shallower water to breed and have litters of likely 2 pups. The possible maximum length of this species is 40 cm (16 in).

== Habitat & distribution ==
The Indian sharpnose ray possibly used to live around all the coastal regions of Indian subcontinent, but the recent extant habitat is believed to be Orissa and Bengal (India), and Bangladesh.
