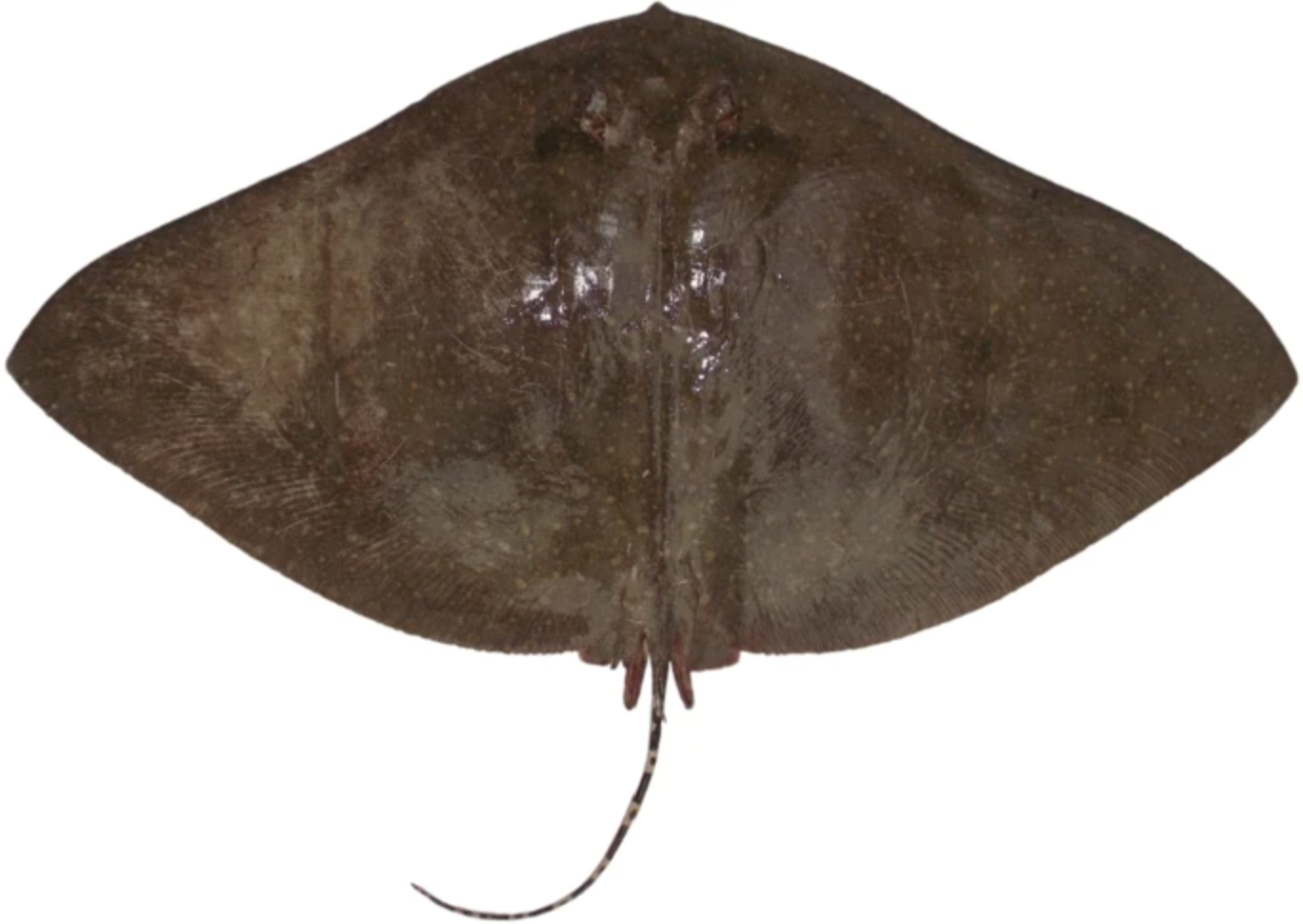
- Dorsal view of Gymnura zonura.

Conservation status
- Endangered (IUCN 3.1)

Scientific classification
- Kingdom: Animalia
- Phylum: Chordata
- Class: Chondrichthyes
- Subclass: Elasmobranchii
- Order: Myliobatiformes
- Family: Gymnuridae
- Genus: Gymnura
- Species: G. zonura

Binomial name
- Gymnura zonura (Bleeker, 1852)
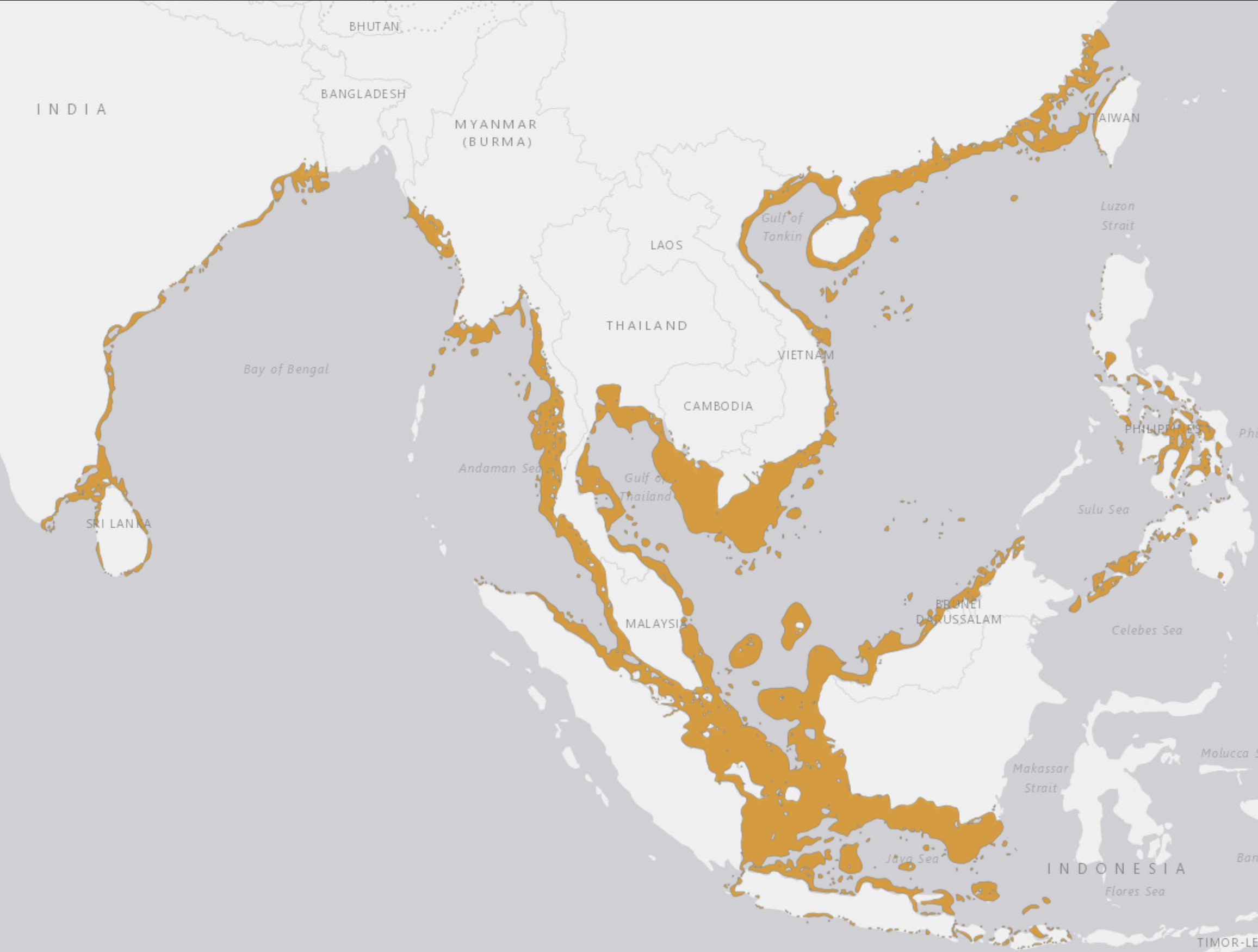
- Range of the Zonetail butterfly ray

Synonyms
- Aetoplatea zonura

= Zonetail butterfly ray =

Species of ray

The zonetail butterfly ray (Gymnura zonura) is a species of ray in the family Gymnuridae. It is found in Indo-Pacific waters near India, Indonesia, Malaysia, the Philippines, Singapore, and Thailand. Its natural habitats includes the open seas, shallow seas, subtidal aquatic beds, and estuarine waters.

They have a mostly brown coloration on their dorsal side, with several small white spots throughout. Their ventral side exhibits white coloration and is entirely smooth-skinned. They can be differentiated from other species of Gymnuridae by their tail, which has 6 to 10 black bands along its length, separated by alternating white bands with single dark spots in between.

Zonetail butterfly rays feed on smaller organisms found on or near the sea floor, such as bony fishes, crustaceans, and molluscs. They are viviparous, giving birth to up to 4 live young per litter.

== Description ==
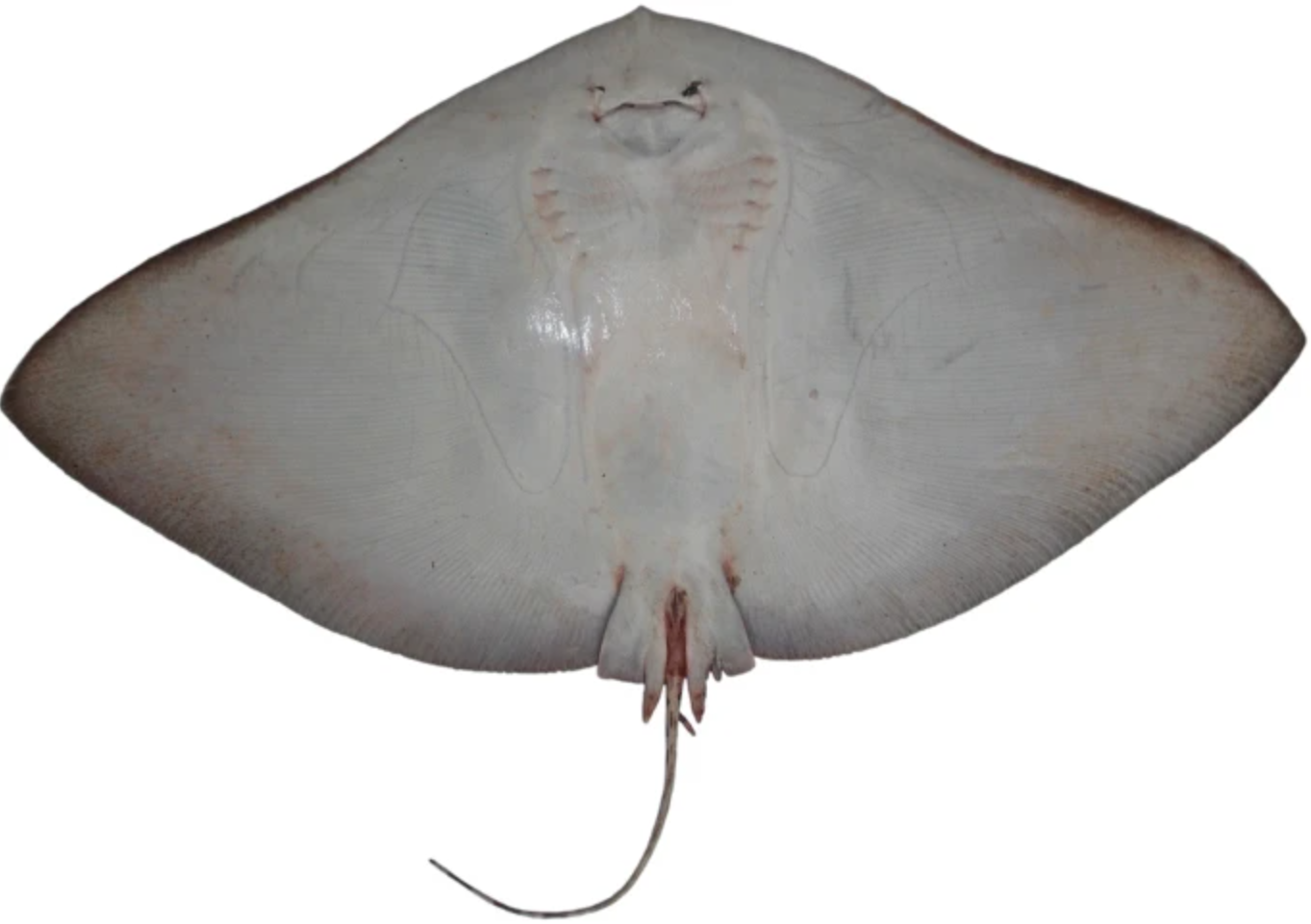
Ventral view.

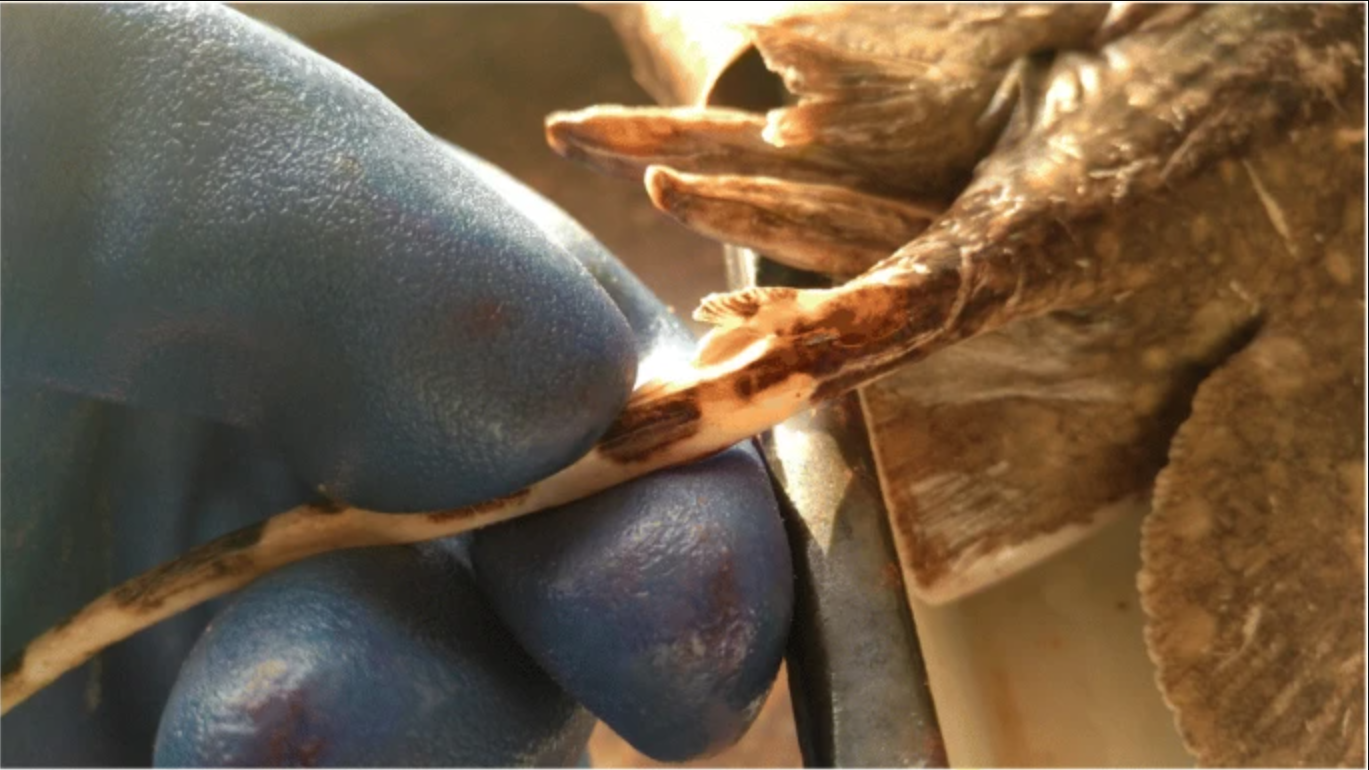
Base of the tail; the small dorsal fin and black bands are evident.

The zonetail butterfly ray has a broad, flattened ("depressed") body shape and a thin body profile. Most of their characteristic shape is formed by a pair of wide pectoral fins (referred to as the disc). Their disc width is greater than their disc length. Their skin is smooth throughout, with the dorsal surface of the body being a uniformly brown color adorned with numerous small, rounded white spots throughout. Their ventral surface is uniformly white. Zonetail butterfly rays have relatively small snouts and eyes, with their spiracles positioned slightly above the eyes.

In contrast to other gymnurids, the zonetail butterfly ray lacks tentacles on the inner posterior lining of its spiracles. The species can be further distinguished from other butterfly rays by its slim, whip-like, and relatively long tail (approximately 2/3 of the snout-vent length). The tail typically has six to ten black bands with alternating white bands along the length, as well as a small dorsal fin attached to the base of the tail. They have been observed to present with single dark spots between each black tail band. The caudal sting of the species is typically underdeveloped and also has a small dorsal fin at its base.

Some studies suggest the presence of sexual dimorphism within G. zonura, with the average disc width of adult males being 477 mm (18.8 in) and the disc width of adult females reaching up to 1,060 mm (42 in) in recorded specimens, although this data is limited. Studies using morphological and mitochondrial DNA analyses indicate that the zonetail butterfly ray shares particularly close relationship with the longtail butterfly ray (G. poecilura), which can also be found across the Indo-Pacific, thus being sympatric.

== Distribution and habitat ==
The zonetail butterfly ray has been found to co-occur (sympatry) with other members of Gymnuridae –such as the longtail butterfly ray – along the Malaysian coastline. They typically inhabit shallow coastal areas in warm temperate and tropical conditions, usually at depths of around 37 m (121 ft). These rays are typically bottom-dwelling, but they are able to use their broad pectoral fins to traverse through open waters. They are distributed throughout the Indo-Pacific region, and have been observed near Brunei Darussalam, Cambodia, China, India, Indonesia (off the coasts of Java, Bali, Kalimantan, and Sumatera), Malaysia, Myanmar, the Philippines, Singapore, Sri Lanka, Taiwan, Thailand, and Vietnam.

== Behavior and ecology ==
In general, butterfly rays are capable of both undulatory and oscillatory swimming locomotion. They exhibit multiple derived pectoral fin developments, such as lateral expansion, anteroposterior elongation of the pectoral girdle, and pectoral stiffening from the calcification and cross-bracing of the radials (fin-rays). As a result of this, zonetail butterfly rays can access both pelagic and benthic zones, but likely prefer spending more time near the benthos as indicated by their feeding habits and dictated by their inferior mouth position. They use small undulations of the pectoral fins near the benthos presumably to keep the surrounding sediment undisturbed, allowing for better detection of prey through the use of their ventral lateral line. They exhibit higher-speed swimming when traversing through the water column via quick, powerful downstrokes.

Beyond transportation, butterfly rays can make use of their large pectoral fins to stun and pin prey to the floor for predation.

=== Feeding habits ===
Zonetail butterfly rays have been found to feed primarily on bony fish, particularly anchovies and ponyfishes. Their inferior mouth type and co-occurrence with longtail butterfly rays indicate that they may also feed on benthic crustaceans and molluscs, but there is currently limited observed data on this for G. zonura. In general, Gymnuridae are piscivorous, feeding on both mesopelagic and benthic fish species. Their ability to swim through multiple levels of the water column likely contributes to this range in diet. The particular feeding habits of the Zonetail butterfly ray, outside of general Gymnuridae family trends, remain generally understudied.

=== Life history ===
Zonetail butterfly rays, as in other butterfly rays, exhibit viviparous embryonic development. Their mode of viviparity entails initial nourishment of the offspring by yolk, and then subsequently by uterine milk (histotroph) rich in proteins and lipids up until birth. In butterfly rays, reproduction occurs via internal fertilization, where the male inserts one of its two claspers into the female cloaca to deposit sperm onto the eggs. Male claspers grow and calcify with maturity, while female ovaries grow and develop ovarian follicles as they mature. The species has 2-4 pups per litter. Females have likely evolved to grow larger than males in order to increase their reproductive potential as live bearers- producing both larger offsprings and more young- a quality that has been observed in other Elasmobranchs. There is little information on their rearing habits or gestation, but other butterfly rays have been shown to exhibit year-round reproduction, with embryonic development lasting several months. Zonetail butterfly rays are thought to be able to live up to 15 years, but information on this remains understudied.

== Relation to humans ==
As of 2020, the International Union for Conservation of Nature (IUCN) has listed the Zonetail butterfly ray as an Endangered species. They are primarily threatened by overfishing from commercial fisheries (via trawling) for use as raw materials, but are of relatively low value due to their small size compared to other rays. Their meat is typically sold for both human consumption and as bait for longline fishing. Other fishing purposes, including targeted artisanal and recreational activities, along with bycatch- also contribute to the overall anthropogenic threat that they face. Competition with other butterfly rays, particularly the longtail butterfly ray, due to similar feeding habits and overlapping distribution ranges, may also play a role in their low abundance. Zonetail butterfly rays may be especially sensitive to these pressures because of their low fecundity. The sparse amount of knowledge and attention on this particular species is likely a factor in the lack of focused conservation efforts for them.
