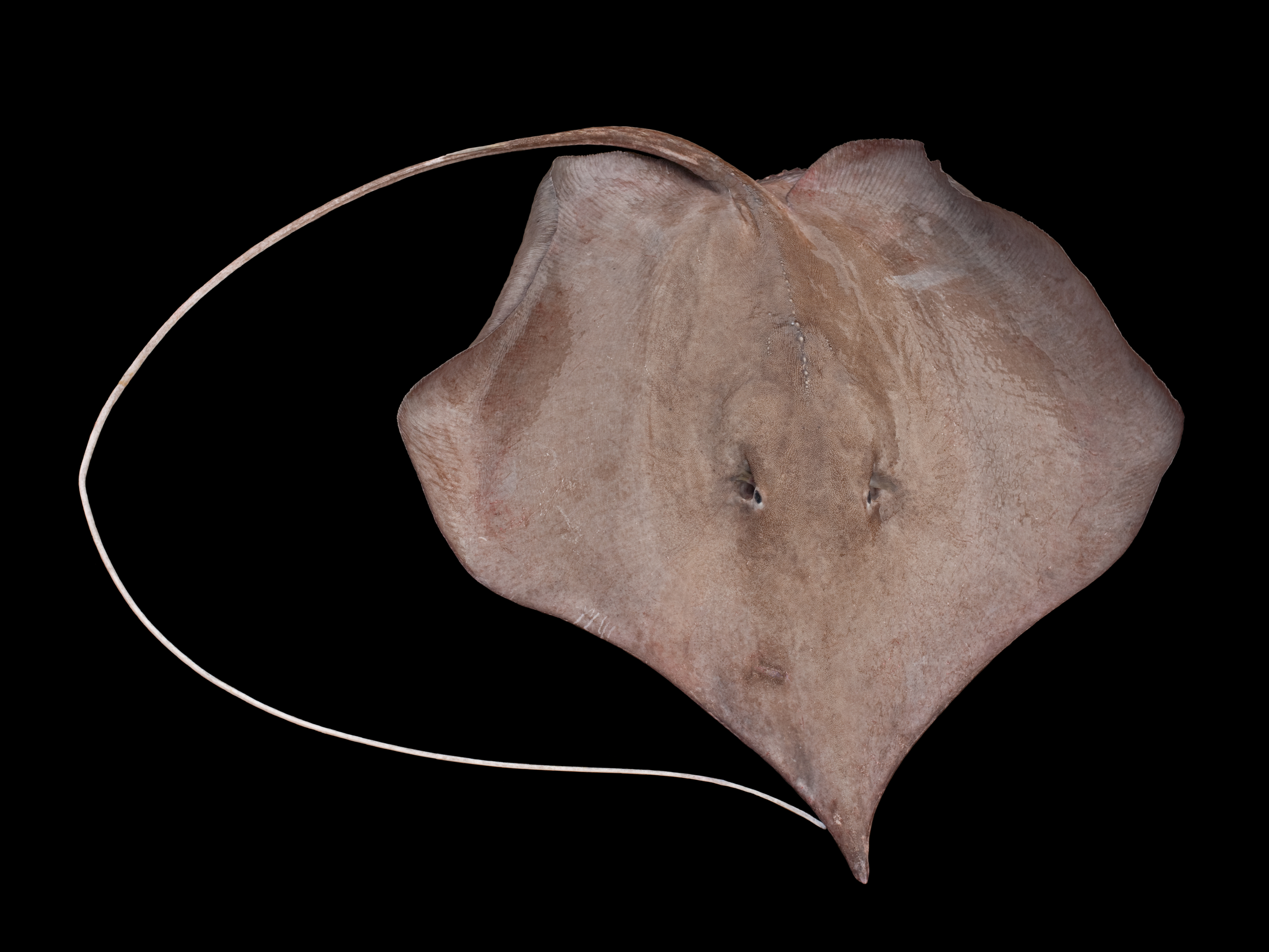
- F. geijskesi

Scientific classification
- Kingdom: Animalia
- Phylum: Chordata
- Class: Chondrichthyes
- Subclass: Elasmobranchii
- Order: Myliobatiformes
- Family: Dasyatidae
- Subfamily: Urogymninae
- Genus: Fontitrygon; Last, Naylor & Manjaji-Matsumoto, 2016

Type species
- Trygon margarita Günther, 1870

= Fontitrygon =

Genus of cartilaginous fishes

Fontitrygon is a genus of stingrays in the family Dasyatidae found in coastal tropical Atlantic waters and rivers that drain into the Atlantic. Fontitrygon species were formerly contained within the genus Dasyatis.

== Species ==
- Fontitrygon colarensis (Santos, Gomes & Charvet-Almeida, 2004) (Colares stingray)
- Fontitrygon garouaensis (Stauch & Blanc, 1962) (Niger stingray)
- Fontitrygon geijskesi (Boeseman, 1948) (Sharpsnout stingray)
- Fontitrygon margarita (Günther, 1870) (Daisy stingray)
- Fontitrygon margaritella (Compagno & Roberts, 1984) (Pearl stingray)
- Fontitrygon ukpam (J. A. Smith, 1863) (Pincushion ray)
