= Backwater butterfly ray =

Conservation status
- Least Concern (IUCN 3.1)

Scientific classification
- Kingdom: Animalia
- Phylum: Chordata
- Class: Chondrichthyes
- Subclass: Elasmobranchii
- Order: Myliobatiformes
- Family: Gymnuridae
- Genus: Gymnura
- Species: G. natalensis

Binomial name
- Gymnura natalensis (Gilchrist & W. W. Thompson, 1911)

Species of fish

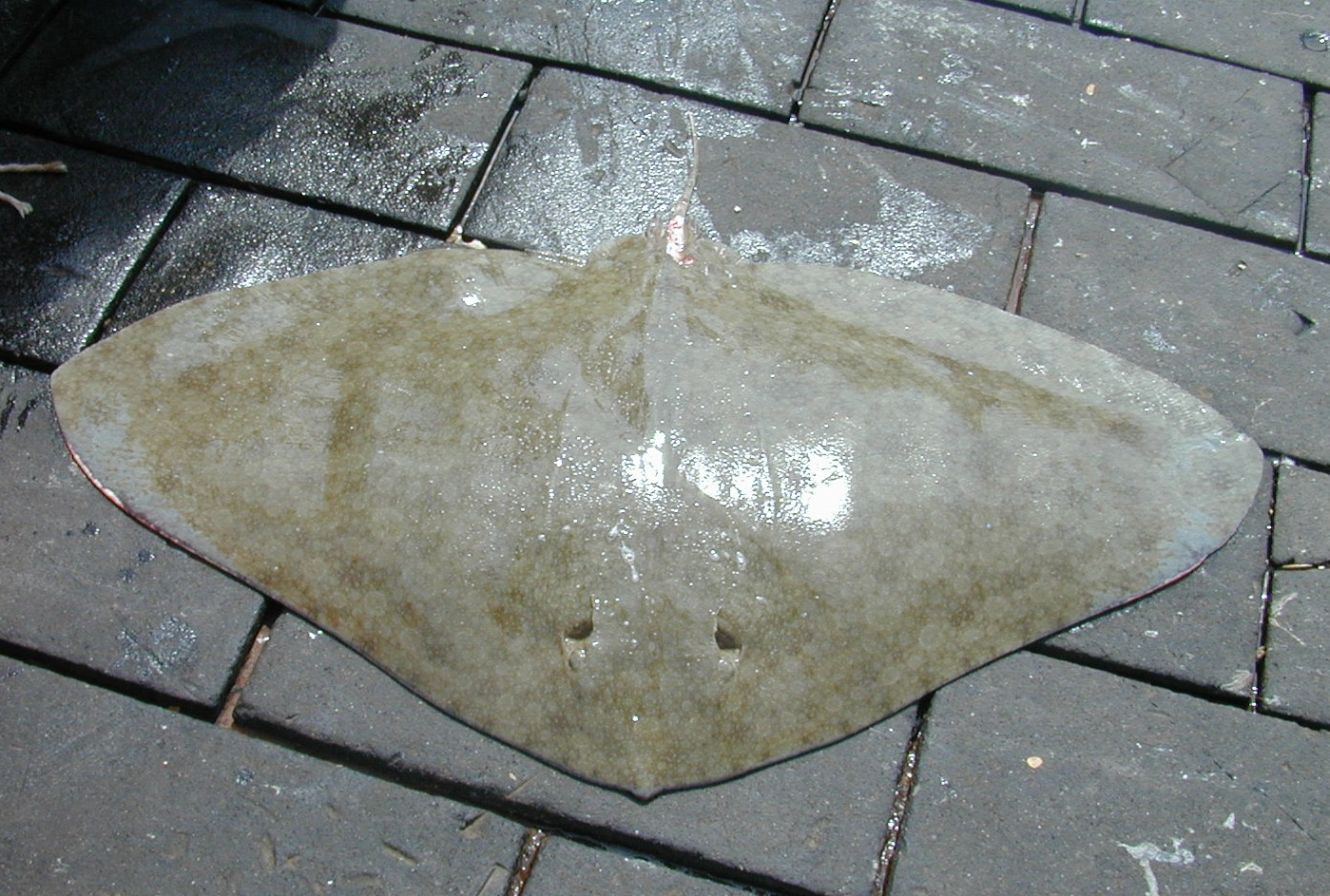

The backwater butterfly ray, butterfly ray, diamond ray, or short-tailed ray (Gymnura natalensis) is a species of chondrichthyan fish in the family Gymnuridae (butterfly rays). It is found off the coasts of Mozambique, Namibia, South Africa, and may also be found off the coasts of Kenya and Tanzania as well. This species' natural habitats are open seas, shallow seas, estuarine waters, and coastal saline lagoons. It is threatened by habitat loss, though it was considered common from 1940s-1960s.
