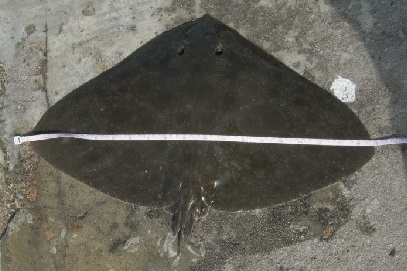

Conservation status
- Near Threatened (IUCN 3.1)

Scientific classification
- Kingdom: Animalia
- Phylum: Chordata
- Class: Chondrichthyes
- Subclass: Elasmobranchii
- Order: Myliobatiformes
- Family: Gymnuridae
- Genus: Gymnura
- Species: G. marmorata

Binomial name
- Gymnura marmorata (J. G. Cooper, 1864)

= California butterfly ray =

Species of cartilaginous fish

The California butterfly ray (Gymnura marmorata) is a species of ray in the family Gymnuridae. It is found in Colombia, Costa Rica, Ecuador, El Salvador, Guatemala, Honduras, Mexico, Nicaragua, Panama, Peru, and the United States. Its natural habitats are shallow seas, subtidal aquatic beds, coral reefs, estuarine waters, intertidal marshes, and coastal saline lagoons.
