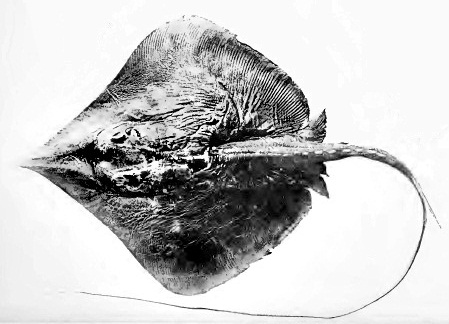

Conservation status
- Vulnerable (IUCN 3.1)

Scientific classification
- Kingdom: Animalia
- Phylum: Chordata
- Class: Chondrichthyes
- Subclass: Elasmobranchii
- Order: Myliobatiformes
- Family: Dasyatidae
- Genus: Telatrygon
- Species: T. zugei

Binomial name
- Telatrygon zugei (J. P. Müller & Henle, 1841)

Synonyms
- Dasyatis cheni Teng, 1962; Dasyatis zugei (Müller & Henle, 1841); Trygon crozieri Blyth, 1860; Trygon zugei J. P. Müller & Henle, 1841

= Pale-edged stingray =

Species of cartilaginous fish

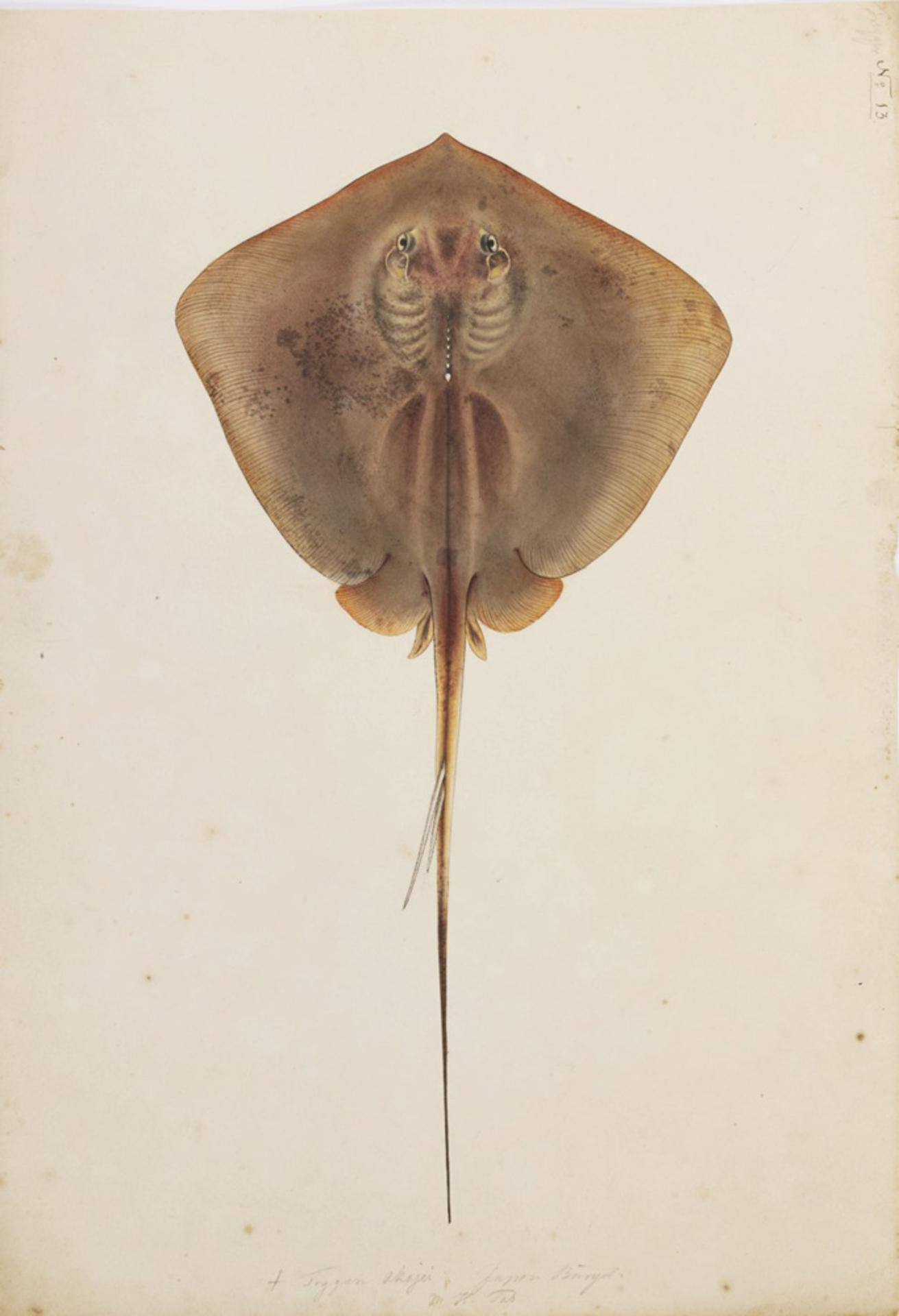
Historical image of Dasyatis zugei by Kawahara Keiga, 1823–1829.

The pale-edged stingray or sharpnose stingray (Telatrygon zugei) is a species of stingray in the family Dasyatidae, found in the Indian and Pacific Oceans from India to the western Malay Archipelago and southern Japan. This bottom-dwelling ray is most commonly found over sandy areas shallower than 100 m (330 ft), as well as in estuaries. Measuring up to 29 cm (11 in) across, the pale-edged stingray has a diamond-shaped pectoral fin disc, a long projecting snout, small eyes, and a whip-like tail with both dorsal and ventral fin folds. It is chocolate brown above and white below.

The diet of the pale-edged stingray consists mainly of small crustaceans and fishes. Reproduction is aplacental viviparous, with females bearing litters of 1–3 young. Caught as bycatch and utilized for its meat, this species is threatened by heavy fishing pressure throughout its range and has been assessed as Vulnerable by the International Union for Conservation of Nature (IUCN).

== Taxonomy and phylogeny ==
German biologists Johannes Müller and Friedrich Henle originally described the pale-edged stingray from seven syntypes, in their 1841 Systematische Beschreibung der Plagiostomen. They named it Trygon zugei after zugu-ei, the Japanese name for this species. The genus Trygon was synonymized with Dasyatis by subsequent authors. Several early accounts of D. zugei were confounded by specimens of D. acutirostra; in 1988 Nishida and Nakaya published a study that resolved the differences between these two species and designated a new lectotype for D. zugei.

Lisa Rosenberger's 2001 phylogenetic analysis, based on morphological characters, found that the pale-edged stingray is sister to a clade containing the whitespotted whipray (Maculabatis gerrardi), the pearl stingray (Fontitrygon margaritella), and the smooth butterfly ray (Gymnura micrura). These results support the growing consensus that neither Dasyatis nor Himantura are monophyletic.

== Distribution and habitat ==
The range of the pale-edged stingray extends from the Indian subcontinent eastward to Java and Borneo, and northward to the Philippines and southern Japan. This species inhabits the inner continental shelf, favoring sandy flats in water under 100 m (330 ft) deep, and also frequently enters estuaries.

== Description ==
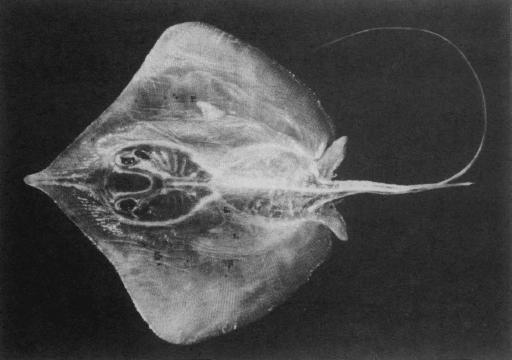
The pale-edged stingray is diamond-shaped, with a notably elongated snout.

The pale-edged stingray has a diamond-shaped pectoral fin disc slightly longer than wide, with concave anterior margins merging into an elongated, triangular snout; the head comprises more than half of the disc length. The eyes are small, with a pair of much larger spiracles immediately behind. There is a nearly rectangular curtain of skin between the nares, with a fringed rear margin. The mouth is gently curved, without papillae on the floor. There are 40–55 tooth rows in either jaw, arranged with a quincunx pattern into pavement-like surfaces. The teeth of adult males have pointed cusps while those of juveniles and females are blunt.

The pelvic fins are triangular. The tail is whip-like, much longer than the disc, and bears a stinging spine. A low dorsal fin fold originates just posterior of the spine tip while a deeper ventral fin fold originates below the spine base. Young individuals have smooth skin, while adults have a row of 5–9 small tubercles in front of the spine. The dorsal surface is a uniform chocolate brown, darkening on the tail fin folds, while the underside is white with a brown band around the margin of the disc. This species reaches a length of 75 cm (30 in) and width of 29 cm (11 in), though most do not exceed 18–24 cm (7.1–9.4 in) in width. The pale-edged stingray differs from the similar but larger D. acutirostra in having smaller eyes and an upper tail fin fold, as well as in several meristic counts such as the number of intestinal valves.

== Biology and ecology ==
The pale-edged stingray feeds mainly on bottom-dwelling crustaceans, in particular prawns, but also takes small fishes. Parasites that have been identified from this species include the tapeworms Acanthobothrium zugeinensis, Balanobothrium yamagutii, Pithophorus zugeii, Polypocephalus ratnagiriensis and P. visakhapatnamensis, Rhinebothrium xiamenensis, Shindeiobothrium karbharae, Tetragonocephalum raoi, Tylocephalum singhii, and Uncibilocularis indiana and U. veravalensis, and the capsalid monogenean Trimusculotrema schwartzi. Like other stingrays, the pale-edged stingray is aplacental viviparous, with the young sustained initially by yolk and later histotroph ("uterine milk") secreted by the mother. Females give birth to 1–3 young at a time; there is no defined reproductive seasonality, at least in Indonesian waters. Newborns measure 8–10 cm (3.1–3.9 in) across. Males mature sexually at a disc width of 18 cm (7.1 in) and females at a disc width of 19 cm (7.5 in).

== Human interactions ==
Large numbers of pale-edged stingrays are caught incidentally in bottom trawls and trammel nets, particularly in the Gulf of Thailand, the Java Sea, and off the Indian coast. Most individuals landed are retained for human consumption, although the small size of this species limits its economic significance. The IUCN has assessed the pale-edged stingray as near threatened and notes that it is vulnerable. Across most of its range, this species experiences heavy and increasing fishing pressure, with all size classes susceptible to capture.
