= Colares stingray =

Conservation status
- Critically Endangered (IUCN 3.1)

Scientific classification
- Kingdom: Animalia
- Phylum: Chordata
- Class: Chondrichthyes
- Subclass: Elasmobranchii
- Order: Myliobatiformes
- Family: Dasyatidae
- Genus: Fontitrygon
- Species: F. colarensis

Binomial name
- Fontitrygon colarensis (H. R. S. Santos, U. L. Gomes & Charvet-Almeida, 2004)

Synonyms
- Dasyatis colarensis

Species of cartilaginous fish

The Colares stingray, Fontitrygon colarensis, is a species of stingray in the family Dasyatidae, native to the shallow brackish waters of the Amazon River estuary in northern Brazil. This species inhabits inshore bays during the dry season and moves away from the coast in the rainy season. It is characterized by a rhomboid pectoral fin disk, elongated snout, and a dark band on the lower lip. A fairly large species, males and females attain disk widths of 63 cm (25 in) and 91 cm (36 in) respectively. Females give birth to 1–4 young, possibly annually. Colares stingrays are both targeted and caught as bycatch by Brazilian artisanal and commercial fisheries; these pressures coupled with its small range and slow reproductive rate has led the International Union for Conservation of Nature (IUCN) to list this species as critically endangered.

== Taxonomy ==
The Colares stingray was described by Hugo Santos, Ulisses Gomes, and Patricia Charvet-Almeida in 2004, in the scientific journal Zootaxa. The specific epithet refers to Colares Island in Marajó Bay, where the type specimen, a 2.07 m (6.8 ft) long mature male, was caught.

== Distribution and habitat ==
The range of the Colares stingray appears restricted to the mouth of the Amazon River in northern Brazil, in the estuarine area affected by the river's freshwater discharge; it may also occur in adjacent areas as far as Venezuela. Found to a depth of 6 m (20 ft), this species conducts annual movements that are influenced by salinity: in the dry season it is found in the coastal bays such as Marajó, while in the rainy season it leaves the bays and shifts offshore.

== Description ==
The Colares stingray has a diamond-shaped pectoral fin disk about as long as wide, with rounded margins and a long snout that tapers to a point. The snout of the female is shorter than that of the male, and snout edges dip in slightly near the tip. The eyes are small and followed by large spiracles. There is a flap of skin between the nares with a fringed rear margin and rounded corners. The lower lip is bow-shaped and lined by a distinctive straight, dark band. The dentition is sexually dimorphic: males have pointed, recurved teeth in 43–45 upper tooth rows and 45–60 lower tooth rows, while females have flat-crowned teeth in 66–77 upper tooth rows and 75–77 lower tooth rows. There are 3–4 papillae in a transverse row on the floor of the mouth, which may have forked tips. The pelvic fins are triangular, with the pointed tips extending past the disk. The tail is long and whip-like, measuring more than twice the disk length. A stinging spine with 69–70 serrations and sometimes a low keel are positioned on top of the tail, while a low fin fold runs underneath.

Small, flattened tubercles are randomly arranged along the dorsal midline from the base of the tail to between the eyes, thinning out towards the tip of the snout. Females also have tubercles on the underside. The dorsal coloration is a uniform light brown, becoming darker on the tail and claspers (in males), and with a light trailing margin on the pelvic fins. The underside is pale, darkening towards the fin margins. Males reach 2.07 m (6.8 ft) long and 63 cm (25 in) across, while females reach 2.61 m (8.6 ft) long and 91 cm (36 in) across.

== Biology and ecology ==
Like other stingrays, the Colares stingray is aplacental viviparous; only recently impregnated females can be found inshore, suggesting that the annual movements of this species may relate to reproduction. Observed litter sizes range from 1 to 4, and the reproductive cycle may last one year.

== Human interactions ==
The International Union for Conservation of Nature (IUCN) has assessed the Colares stingray as critically endangered, citing its limited geographic distribution, likely slow reproductive rate, and susceptibility to fishing gear. This species is abundant in Marajó Bay during the dry season. It is taken as bycatch in artisanal and commercial fisheries targeting catfish in the Amazon estuary. In addition, industrial fishing vessels from the Brazilian state of Pará began to fish directly for this species in the 2000s, with their catches exported to Europe. The IUCN has recommended that Brazil implement habitat conservation and fishery management schemes.
