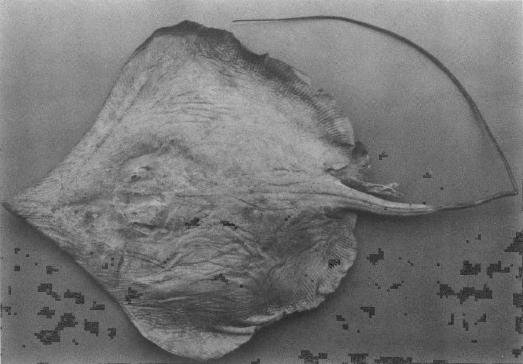

Conservation status
- Vulnerable (IUCN 3.1)

Scientific classification
- Kingdom: Animalia
- Phylum: Chordata
- Class: Chondrichthyes
- Subclass: Elasmobranchii
- Order: Myliobatiformes
- Family: Dasyatidae
- Genus: Telatrygon
- Species: T. acutirostra

Binomial name
- Telatrygon acutirostra K. Nishida & Nakaya, 1988

Synonyms
- Dasyatis acutirostra Nishida & Nakaya, 1988

= Telatrygon acutirostra =

Sharpnose stingray

Species of cartilaginous fish

"Sharpnose stingray" may also refer to Telatrygon zugei, Maculabatis gerrardi, or Pateobatis jenkinsii.

The sharpnose stingray (Telatrygon acutirostra) is a little-known species of stingray in the family Dasyatidae, found off southern Japan and in the East China Sea. With a rounded pectoral fin disc and a long, projecting snout, T. acutirostra resembles (and was historically confused with) the smaller pale-edged stingray (T. zugei). A number of characteristics differentiate this species from T. zugei, including larger eyes and the absence of a dorsal fin fold on the tail. The International Union for Conservation of Nature (IUCN) has assessed this species as Vulnerable, as its restricted distribution renders it vulnerable to increases in fishing pressure.

== Taxonomy ==
Prior to being scientifically described, T. acutirostra has been confused for T. zugei; the two species have been confounded by various authors since at least Jordan and Fowler's 1903 review of Japanese elasmobranchs. In 1988, Kiyonori Nishida and Kazuhiro Nakaya published a study of the T. zugei species complex with a description of T. acutirostra, in the Japanese Journal of Ichthyology. The specific epithet comes from the Latin acuti ("sharp") and rostra ("snout"). The type specimen is an adult male 72.5 cm (28.5 in) across, trawled from the East China Sea.

== Distribution and habitat ==
Telatrygon acutirostra is known from off southern Japan and in the East China Sea at a depth of 53–142 m (174–466 ft), though there is also a possible record of this species from the Gulf of Guayaquil off Ecuador. Like most other stingrays this species is benthic in nature.

== Description ==
The pectoral fin disc of T. acutirostra is about as wide as it is long, with rounded outer margins and concave leading margins merging with a long, triangular snout. The eyes are small and followed by larger spiracles. There is a curtain of skin between the nares, with a fringed, straight posterior margin. The mouth is slightly curved and lacks papillae on the floor. There are 40–51 upper tooth rows and 39–49 lower tooth rows, arranged with a quincunx pattern into pavement-like surfaces. The teeth of adult males have pointed cusps unlike in juveniles and females. The pelvic fins are wide and triangular. The tail is whip-like and longer than the disc, and bears 1-2 stinging spines on the upper surface. A subtle dorsal keel and low ventral fin fold are present behind the spine.

There is a row of 30 tubercles along the midline of the back, and another row of 16 tubercles in front of the spine. The tail behind the spine is covered by small denticles. The coloration is light brown above and white below. The largest known specimen has a disc width of 72.5 cm (28.5 in). This species can be distinguished from the similar T. zugei by a larger eyeball size, the absence of a dorsal fin fold on the tail, a larger maturation size, and various meristic characters.

== Biology and ecology ==
Virtually nothing is known of the natural history of T. acutirostra. One male specimen 35.4 cm (13.9 in) was immature, while another 72.5 cm (28.5 in) across was mature. It is presumably aplacental viviparous like other stingrays.

== Human interactions ==
Telatrygon acutirostra likely forms part of coastal bottom trawl and set net fishery catches operating off Japan and elsewhere, though specific utilization data is required. The International Union for Conservation of Nature (IUCN) has assessed this species as Vulnerable, as it would be highly susceptible to increasing fishing pressure given its possibly limited geographic distribution.
