= Niger stingray =

Conservation status
- Critically Endangered (IUCN 3.1)

Scientific classification
- Kingdom: Animalia
- Phylum: Chordata
- Class: Chondrichthyes
- Subclass: Elasmobranchii
- Order: Myliobatiformes
- Family: Dasyatidae
- Genus: Fontitrygon
- Species: F. garouaensis

Binomial name
- Fontitrygon garouaensis (Stauch & Blanc, 1962)

Synonyms
- Potamotrygon garouaensis Stauch & Blanc, 1962; Dasyatis garouaensis Stauch & Blanc, 1962

Species of cartilaginous fish

The Niger stingray or smooth freshwater stingray (Fontitrygon garouaensis) is a species of stingray in the family Dasyatidae, native to rivers in Nigeria and Cameroon. Attaining a width of 40 cm (16 in), this species can be distinguished by its thin, almost circular pectoral fin disk, slightly projecting snout tip, and mostly smooth skin with small or absent dermal denticles. The Niger stingray feeds on aquatic insect larvae and is ovoviviparous. The long stinging spine on the tail of this ray can inflict a painful wound. It has been assessed as Critically Endangered by the International Union for Conservation of Nature (IUCN), as its numbers are declining in some areas and it faces heavy fishing pressure and habitat degradation.

== Taxonomy ==
The original description of the Niger stingray was published by Alfred Stauch and M. Blanc in 1962, in the scientific journal Bulletin du Muséum National d'Histoire Naturelle (Série 2). The specific epithet garouaensis refers to the city of Garoua, Cameroon, where the type specimen was caught. Stauch and Blanc assigned this species to Potamotrygon, which would have made it the only representative of the genus outside South America. In 1975, Thomas Thorson and Donald Watson examined new specimens and concluded, on morphological and physiological grounds, that this species is a member of Dasyatis.

== Distribution and habitat ==
Along with the pincushion ray (F. ukpam), the Niger stingray is one of the two freshwater stingrays in Africa. This ray is only known from three river systems in Nigeria and Cameroon: the Benue and lower Niger River, the lower Sanaga River, and the Cross River. Records of this species in Lagos Lagoon are unconfirmed. The Niger stingray has only been found in fresh water, though the possibility that it may be euryhaline (tolerant of varying salinities) cannot be discounted.

== Description ==
The pectoral fin disk of the Niger stingray is nearly circular, only about 5% longer than it is wide, and contains 122–124 internal rays on either side. The disk is more flattened than that of any other stingray in the region, measuring no more than 11% as thick as wide. The anterior margins of the disk are weakly concave, with the tip of the snout slightly protruding. The eyes are medium-sized and protruding, with small spiracles placed behind. The nares are covered by a flap of skin with a fringed posterior margin, that reaches the small mouth. There are 16–18 tooth rows in the upper jaw and 14–28 tooth rows in the lower jaw. The teeth are small and closely set; those of females are oval and blunt while those of males are triangular with a sharp backward-pointing cusp. A single row of five papillae is found on the floor of the mouth.

The pelvic fins are roughly triangular, and the tail is whip-like and measures twice as long as the disk is wide. One or more stinging spines are positioned between one-sixth and one-fifth of the way along the tail, and a narrow ventral fin fold originates closely behind the spine insertion. The skin is mostly smooth, except for a patch of small, flat dermal denticles at the center of the back. Some rays may lack denticles altogether, while others may have a 2–4 slightly larger denticles along the midline. The coloration is plain brown or gray above, lightening at the disk margin, and white below with the fins outlined in starker white. This species attains a maximum recorded disk width of 40 cm (16 in).

== Biology and ecology ==
In common with other freshwater members of its family, the osmoregulatory system of the Niger stingray retains substantial amounts of urea within the body (albeit much lower than in marine species), as well as the means to concentrate urea. Compared to the Potamotrygon stingrays, which osmoregulate in a similar fashion as freshwater bony fishes and have speciated dramatically, the Niger stingray and its relatives may be more recent colonizers of fresh water. The ampullae of Lorenzini in this species are smaller and simpler than those of marine stingrays, reflecting the constraints imposed on electroreception by the freshwater environment. The Niger stingray feeds almost exclusively on the aquatic nymphs of mayflies, stoneflies, and caddisflies, rarely also taking true flies.

The Niger stingray is ovoviviparous; females have a single functional ovary on the left side. This species has been estimated to mature at two years of age, with males living up to five years and females seven years. In the Benue River, one examined female 31.5 cm (12.4 in) across was immature, while a male 34.4 cm (13.5 in) across was mature. In the Sanaga River, males mature at under 26.4 cm (10.4 in) across and females at 26–30 cm (10–12 in) across.

== Human interactions ==
The tail spine of the Niger stingray is potentially injurious to waders; it is known to the Hausa people as kunaman ruwa or "water scorpion". This species is caught incidentally and sold fresh or smoked for human consumption. Historically it was most common in the Niger-Benue river system, though its numbers there are diminishing; the possible disappearance of this species from its type locality near Garoua was reported to have resulted from drought. A substantial number can be found in the Sanaga River, though the population trend there is unknown. The International Union for Conservation of Nature (IUCN) has assessed this species as Critically Endangered, citing documented population declines and the possible negative effects of overfishing and habitat degradation. These pressures are likely to increase as the range of this species becomes more heavily populated.
