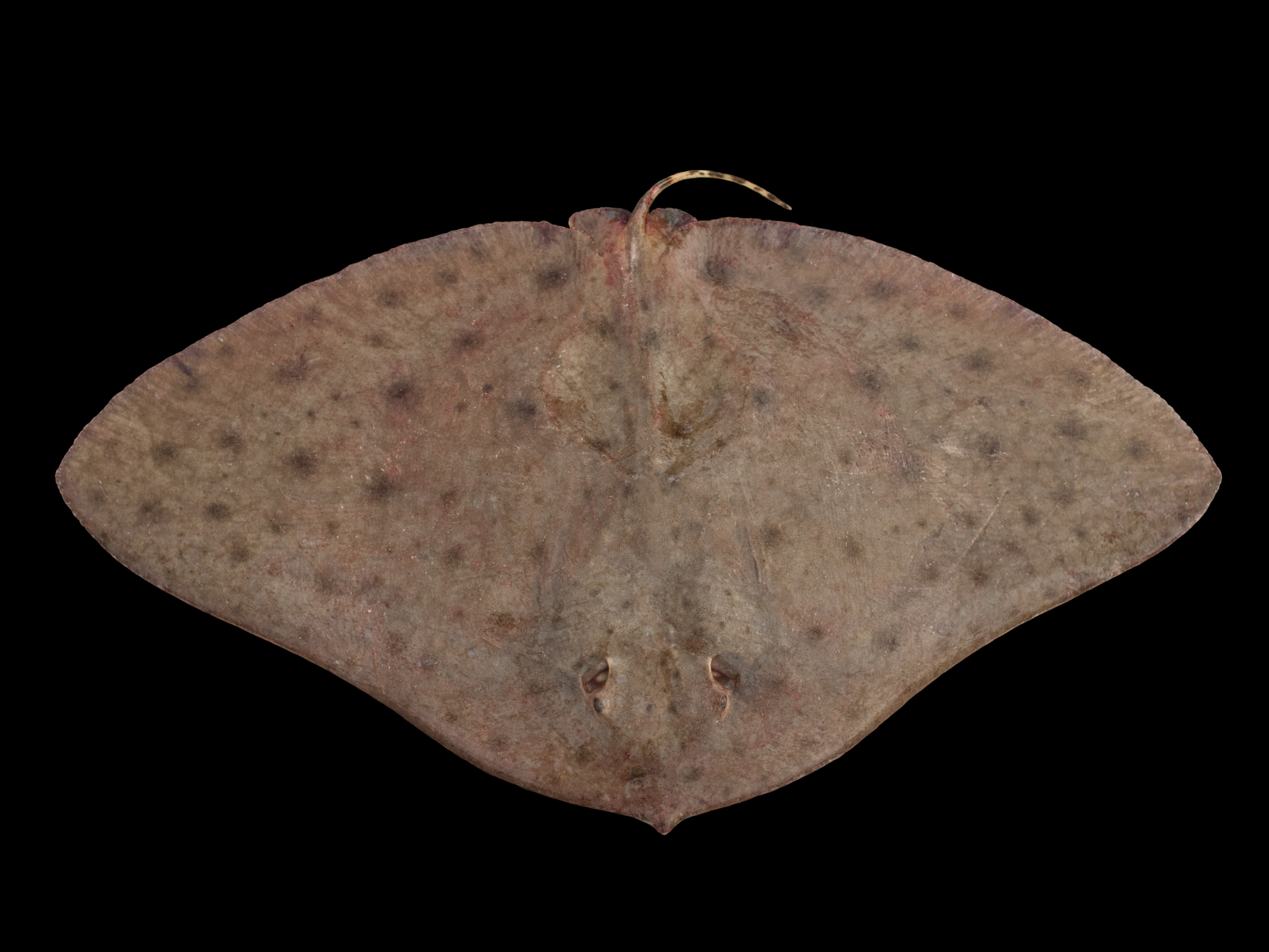

Conservation status
- Near Threatened (IUCN 3.1)

Scientific classification
- Kingdom: Animalia
- Phylum: Chordata
- Class: Chondrichthyes
- Subclass: Elasmobranchii
- Order: Myliobatiformes
- Family: Gymnuridae
- Genus: Gymnura
- Species: G. micrura

Binomial name
- Gymnura micrura (Bloch & J. G. Schneider, 1801)

= Smooth butterfly ray =

Species of fish

The smooth butterfly ray (Gymnura micrura) is a species of cartilaginous fish in the family Gymnuridae. It is a member of the order Myliobatiformes, which contains 10 total families. Its natural habitats are shallow seas, subtidal aquatic beds, estuarine waters, and coastal saline lagoons. Its common name is derived from its compressed body, pectoral fins that are wider than their length, and overall diamond shape.

== Taxonomy ==
Gymnura is derived from Greek roots and translates into 'naked tail'. They belong to a monophyletic group of Batoid fish. This group contains over 500 other elasmobranch fishes which includes electric rays, sawfishes, guitarfishes, skates, and stingrays. They are a part of Order Myliobatiformes and are characterized by their pectoral fins being widely expanded and fused to their heads. The family Gymnuridae contains two genera which encompass 12 different species.

=== Description ===
These are broad diamond-shaped rays with a short tail that has low dorsal and ventral fin folds. The tail has three or four dark lines that are referred to as crossbars. The edges of the disc are concave. The caudal fin is never present and a variable number of tubercles can be found on larger specimens. The smooth butterfly rays have disc widths nearly twice the size of their body lengths and are very flat-bodied (compressed). The width of the rays are between 16 and 22 centimeters when they are born and are about 50 cm when mature for a female and about 42 cm for a male. Females are bigger than their male counterparts; this allows them to carry larger embryos and a greater abundance of embryos. They have a maximum size of 120 cm.

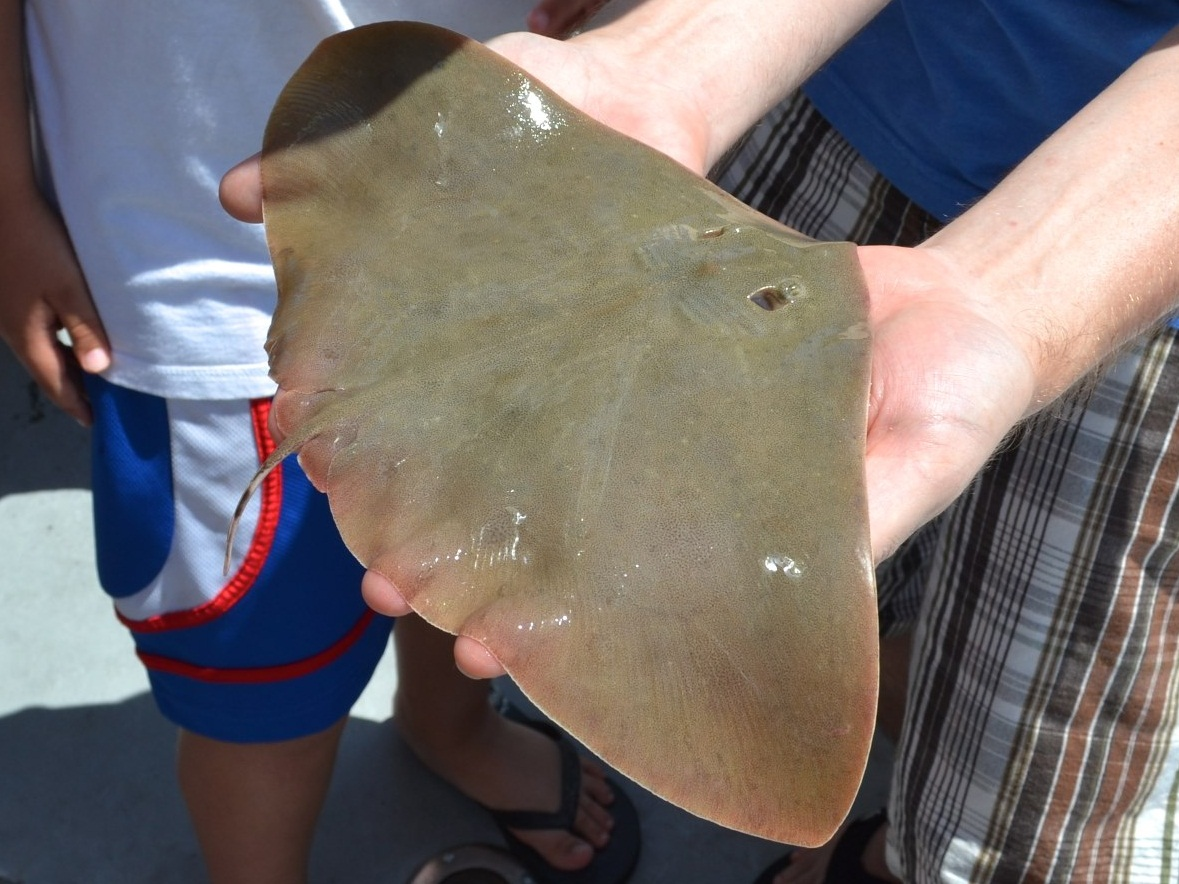
Dorsal view of a Smooth Butterfly Ray

The ventral side is lightly colored while the dorsal side is variable in color. The ventral side is usually white but can contain a rusty or bronze coloration. The dorsal side can be grey, light green, brown, and also not uniform in color. They tend to use countershading to blend in with the bottom of their environments in order to hide from predators and to catch prey.

The dorsal spine on the tail is absent; therefore, no stinging can occur to harm humans.

== Distribution and habitat ==
Smooth butterfly rays are found in the western and eastern parts of the Atlantic Ocean (Maryland to Brazil) and the Gulf of Mexico. They are most commonly found in neritic waters, but are also known to enter brackish estuaries and hypersaline lagoons. They have a range that extends from the continental shelf to 40 meters deep in tropical and warm waters. They prefer habitats that have either sandy or muddy bottoms.

== Behavior and ecology ==
=== Lifecycle ===
These rays invest a large amount of energy in reproduction and only give birth to a few offspring; however, they give birth on a yearly basis. They use internal fertilization which is the process of the male inserting his claspers into the female's cloaca to fertilize the eggs. The offspring take between two and four months to develop inside the mother. They use aplacental uterine viviparity and the young are histotrophs.

The foraging strategy that these rays use is dependent on the abundance of prey in their environments. They either use opportunistic feeding where they eat what is available, or they use specialized feeding where they eat a specific organism. They tend to feed on larger prey items and swallow them whole; then they enter a long digestion time period where they feed very little or not at all. They prey mainly on teleosts and crustaceans, but have also been noted to consume bivalve mussels and polychaetes. They use a structure called the lateral line canal; it is located on the dorsal side from the head to the pectoral fins, and is arranged in a branching pattern. The lateral line contains neuromasts that assist the rays in detecting changes in water movement. The upper jaw consists of 6 to 120 teeth and the lower jaw has 52 to 106 teeth; each jaw contains 6 to 8 simultaneously functioning rows.

They are hunted by larger predators, such as sharks. The great hammerhead specializes in feeding on butterfly rays and is their main predator in some areas.

=== Locomotion ===
Gymnura micrura alter their swimming habits depending on where they are swimming in the water column. They tend to change between an undulation pattern and an oscillation pattern. They use small amplitude undulations of their fins when they are swimming along the bottom, but switch to an oscillatory approach when they are swimming freely in the water. When swimming freely in the water column, they use a quick, powerful downstroke to increase their speed; this means they move their fins down and then quickly back up. They pause after each stroke and then repeat.

== Conservation ==
The species is currently classified as Near Threatened by the IUCN. It is frequently taken as bycatch but generally released alive. The species is fished commercially and recreationally in parts of Australia, Europe, and Asia.
