= Electric blue =

Electric blue may refer to:

- Electric blue (color)

== Biology ==
- Electric blue crayfish (Procambarus alleni)
- Electric blue gecko (Lygodactylus williamsi)
- Electric blue tarantula (Chilobrachys natanicharum)
- Sciaenochromis, a genus of haplochromine cichlid fish whose males are electric blue, including:
  - Electric blue hap (Sciaenochromis ahli)
  - Electric blue kande (Sciaenochromis psammophilu)

== Music ==
- Electric Blue (album), by Andy Bell, or the title song, 2005
- "Electric Blue" (song), a 1987 song by Icehouse
- "Electric Blue", a song by Arcade Fire from Everything Now, 2017
- "Electric Blue", a song by the Cranberries from To the Faithful Departed, 1996
- "Electric Blue", a song by Mars & Mystre, 2000
- "Electric Blue", a song by Nicole Scherzinger from Big Fat Lie, 2014
- "Mr Electric Blue", a 2025 song by Benson Boone

== Television ==
- Electric Blue (TV series), a 1979–1987 British softcore pornography series

== See also ==
- Ionized-air glow
- Electric Blues (disambiguation)
