= Taraporewala Aquarium =

F
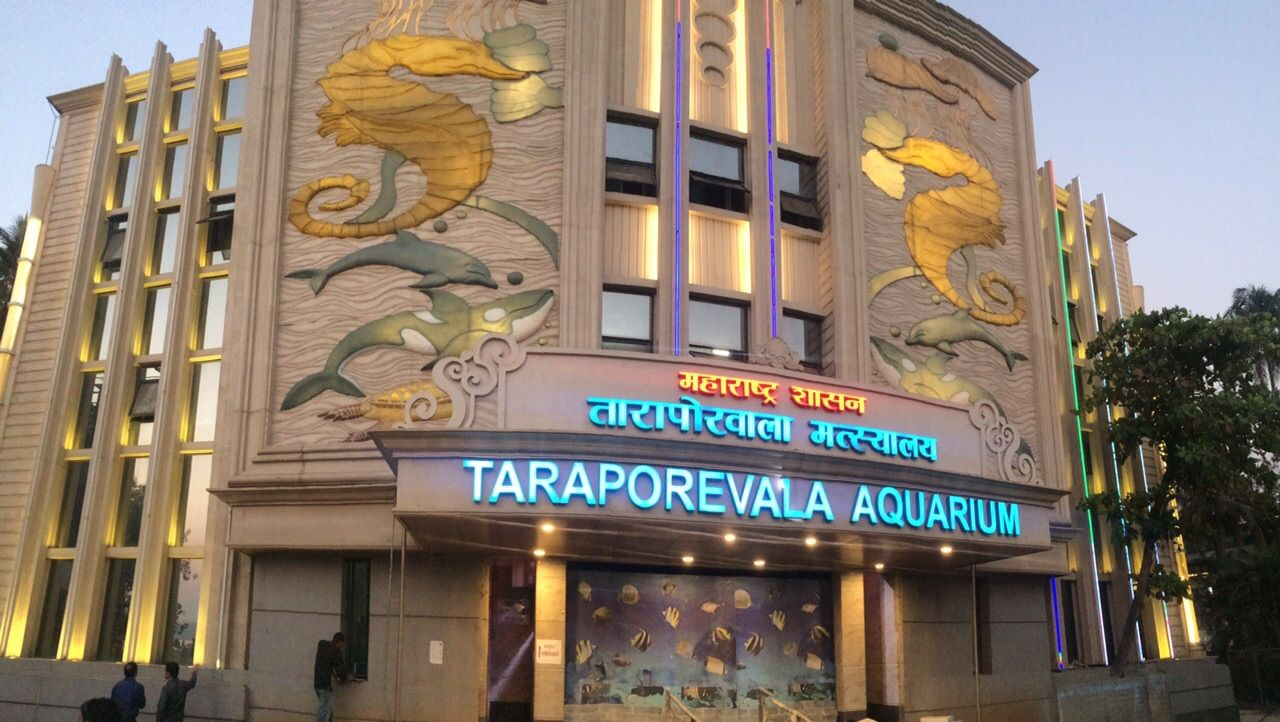
- Interactive map of F
- 18.9492866°N 72.8200758°E
- Date opened: 1951
- Location: Marine Drive, Mumbai
- No. of species: 400
- Volume of largest tank: 22,000
- Annual visitors: 400000

Taraporewala Aquarium or Taraporevala Aquarium is India's oldest aquarium and one of Mumbai's main attractions. It hosts marine and freshwater fish. The aquarium is located on Marine Drive.

The aquarium has a 12-foot-long and 180-degree acrylic glass tunnel. The fish are kept in large glass tanks, which will be lit with LED lights.

The aquarium hosts 2,000 fish across over 400 species. Fish from overseas were introduced at the new aquarium. The number of new varieties of 70 marine fish included Helicopter, Arowana, Grouper, yellow-striped tang, bluespotted stingray, sea stars, clownfish, shark, triggerfish, Moorish idol, azure damsel, blueline demoiselle, purple firefish, cloudy damsel, copperband butterflyfish, schooling bannerfish, raccoon butterflyfish, whitetail trigger, clown triggerfish and blue ribbon eel. The 40 new varieties of freshwater fish include red devil, jaguar, electric blue, Jack Dempsey, frontosa and catfish. These fishes will be housed in larger tanks than before with imported flexi glass for better visibility. The aquarium continues to support sharks, turtles, rays, moray eels, sea turtles, small starfish and stingrays.

The aquarium is maintained by the Department of Fisheries. The aquarium's 16 seawater tanks and 9 freshwater tanks host 31 types of fish, while 32 tropical tanks contain 54 kinds of fish. The tropical section of the aquarium features ecosystems such as the "moss aquarium" for pregnant fish, "plantation aquarium" that features imported varieties of water lilies and other aquatic plants and "island aquarium".

== History ==
Taraporewala Aquarium was built in 1951 at a cost of ₹800,000 (at the time equivalent to US$167,000 using the fixed exchange rate of ₹4.79 to 1 US$). It was inaugurated by India's first president Rajendra Prasad. The aquarium is named after a Parsee Philanthropist D B Taraporewala, who donated ₹200,000 (at the time equivalent to US$41,754 ) for the construction.

The aquarium reopened after renovation on 3 March 2015. It was renovated at a cost of Rs.22 crore (approx Rs 7.5 crore for aquariums and Rs. 16.5 crore for construction work done by the Public Works department).

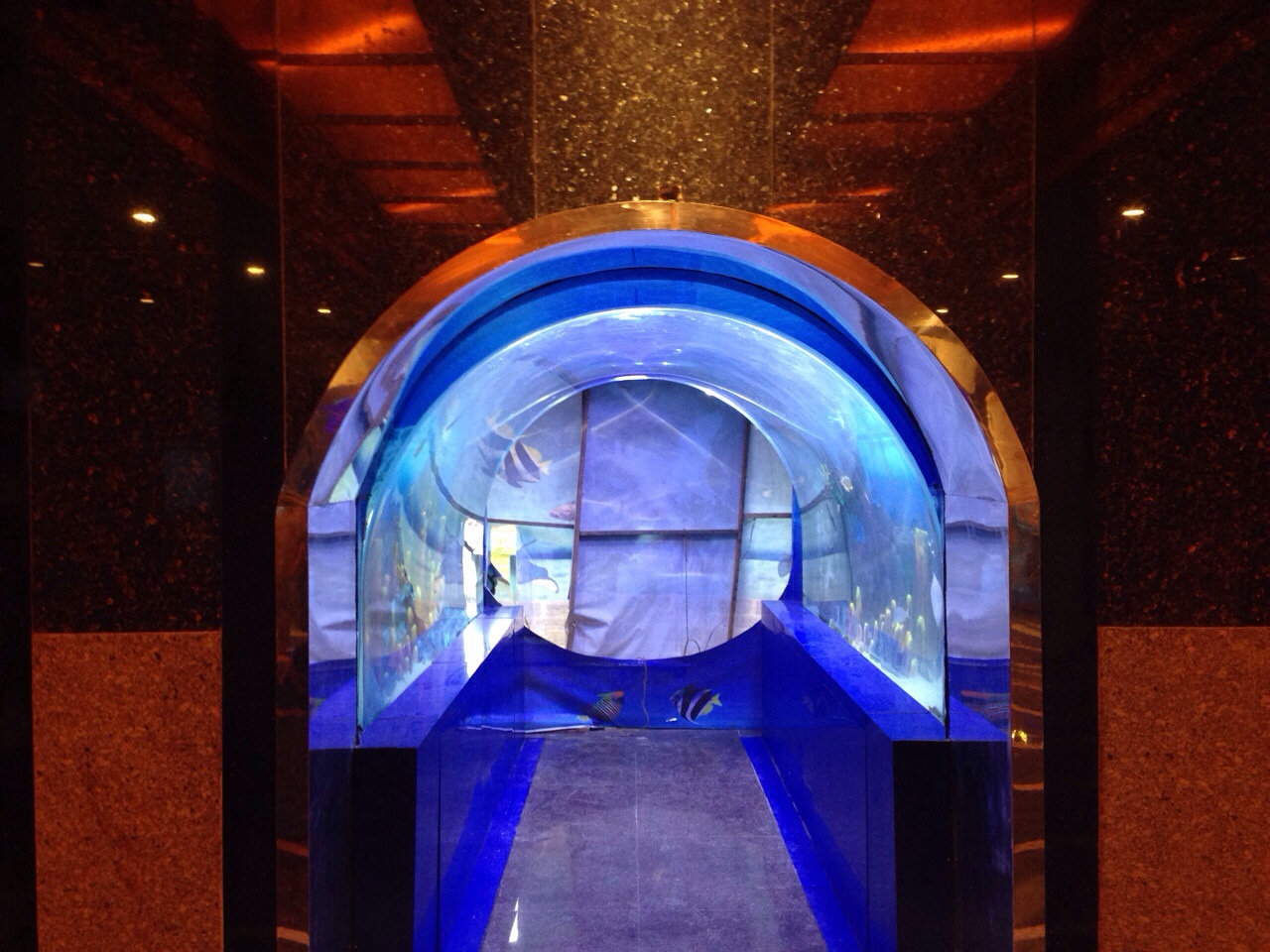
Inside View

New exhibits:

- Oceanarium in the foyer with 22,000 L (5,800 US gal) water.
- Amphitheater with 50 seats, screening documentaries on fish, marine ecosystems and environment conservation.
- Touch pool, where curious visitors can touch star fish, sea urchins, sea cucumbers, and turtles.
- Fish spa. You can dip your feet in one of ten tanks of Doctor fish (Garra rufa). The fish nibble and remove dead skin from your feet and legs.
- Coral and rocky ecosystems with aqua scaping and LED lighting.
- Semi-circular tank housing jelly fish.

== Species of fishes ==
- Damselfish: territorial fish species including golden damselfish, moon tail, cocoa, striped, electric blue, talbot, and sergeant major damsel
- Butterflyfish: chevron, copper band, long-nose, eight band, red perl
- Angelfish : blue ring, regal, wraft and emperor angel fishes
- Triggerfish: undulated, bluetooth, picasso and clown triggers
- Marine eels: yellow head, white ribbon, black ribbon, blue ribbon and moray eel
- Marine touch pool with sea cucumber, sea urchin, brittle star, tube worms, star fish and more
- Groupers: sweetlip, panther, orange spot and black spot groupers
- Tangs: yellow, powder brown, naso, orange shoulder, and powder blue
- Unique species: oranda, stone, red cap, rukin, and black moor
- Other species including bat fish, squirrel fish, golden travery, puffers, jelly fishes, kombada, lion and turkey fish, dwarf lion, whimple, moorish idol, marine coral reef, wrasse, sea anemone, negro, clarkii, and arowana
- Paludarium aquarium with Indian carps: rohu, catla, mrigal
- Tropical aquarium fishes, red tail, sucker, upside down and Asiatic cat fishes
- Other species include: octopuses, seahorses, alligators, catfishes, giant gourami, cichlids, koi, gold fish, sea turtles, red-eared slider and Singaporean turtle
