= Bluespotted stingray =

Bluespotted stingray or blue-spotted stingray may refer to several species:

- Neotrygon australiae, Australian bluespotted maskray
- Neotrygon bobwardi, Bob Ward's maskray
- Neotrygon caeruleopunctata, bluespotted maskray
- Neotrygon indica, Indian-Ocean maskray
- Neotrygon kuhlii, Kuhl's stingray
- Neotrygon malaccensis, Malaccan maskray
- Neotrygon moluccensis, Moluccan maskray
- Neotrygon orientalis, Oriental bluespotted maskray
- Neotrygon trigonoides, New Caledonian maskray
- Neotrygon vali, Guadalcanal maskray
- Neotrygon varidens, Mahogany maskray
- Neotrygon westpapuensis, West Papuan maskray
- Taeniura lymma, bluespotted ribbontail ray
- Taeniura lessoni, Oceania fantail ray
