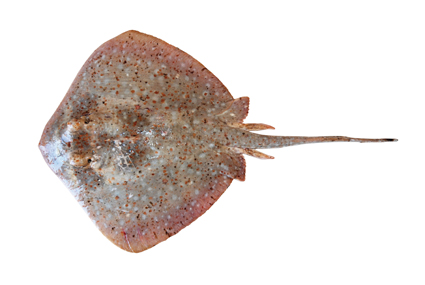

Conservation status
- Data Deficient (IUCN 3.1)

Scientific classification
- Kingdom: Animalia
- Phylum: Chordata
- Class: Chondrichthyes
- Subclass: Elasmobranchii
- Order: Myliobatiformes
- Family: Dasyatidae
- Genus: Neotrygon
- Species: N. ningalooensis

Binomial name
- Neotrygon ningalooensis Last, W. T. White & Puckridge, 2010
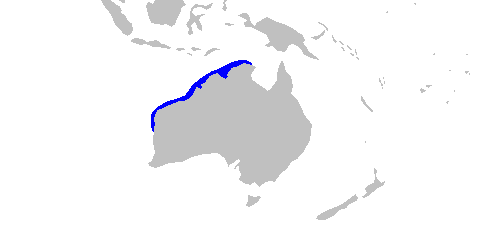
- Range of the Ningaloo maskray

= Ningaloo maskray =

Species of cartilaginous fish

The Ningaloo maskray (Neotrygon ningalooensis) is a species of stingray in the family Dasyatidae, found along the northwestern coast of Australia. Measuring up to 30 cm (12 in) across, it has a diamond-shaped pectoral fin disc with a blunt snout and rounded outer corners. Its tail is whip-like with both upper and lower fin folds. This species has a distinctive dorsal color pattern consisting of numerous small, sharp-edged deep orange spots and slightly larger, fuzzy-edged pale blue spots on a yellowish brown background.

Inhabiting inshore waters less than 5 m (16 ft) deep, the bottom-dwelling Ningaloo maskray has highly specific habitat preferences. It is found on reddish sand near reefs, upon which its coloration grants it excellent camouflage. It is able to bury itself deeper than other maskrays thanks to its protruding eyes. The International Union for Conservation of Nature (IUCN) has listed this species as Data Deficient due to lack of information. It is not vulnerable to fisheries but may be impacted by habitat degradation.

== Taxonomy and phylogeny ==
The first known sighting of the Ningaloo maskray was during a study of Ningaloo Marine Park's sharks and rays (hence its common name and scientific epithet), funded by the Western Australian Marine Science Institute (WAMSI). It was described by Peter Last, William White, and Melody Puckridge in a 2010 article for the scientific journal Aqua. The type specimens are two adult males, one 30 cm (12 in) and the other 29 cm (11 in) across, both collected from Five Fingers Reef near Coral Bay, Western Australia.

- - Taeniura lymma
  - - Neotrygon annotata
    - - Neotrygon ningalooensis
      - - - Neotrygon leylandi
          - Neotrygon picta
        - Neotrygon kuhlii complex

Phylogenetic tree of Neotrygon.

A 2012 phylogenetic study, based on mitochondrial and nuclear DNA, concluded that the Ningaloo maskray and the plain maskray (N. annotata) are the most basal members of their genus. In addition, the Coral Bay population showed deep differences in mitochondrial DNA from the Shark Bay population, indicating that they belong to different lineages. Whether they represent separate species is ambiguous, as rays from the two locations do not differ physically or in known nuclear DNA markers. This genetic divergence suggests that the Ningaloo maskray population had once been divided by sea level changes; using different methods of estimation, this event is thought to have occurred either c. 11 Ma, during the Miocene, or 3–2 Ma, during the Pliocene.

== Description ==
The Ningaloo maskray has a diamond-shaped pectoral fin disc about 1.1 times wider than long, with straight to slightly convex leading margins and rounded outer corners. The snout is short and rounded. The eyes are large and protruding, with large crescent-shaped spiracles behind. Between the slender nostrils is a curtain-shaped flap of skin with a deeply fringed rear margin that is divided into two lobes. The small mouth has shallow grooves at the corners and is surrounded by papillae; there are also two long papillae on the floor of the mouth. The teeth range from long and pointed to short and blunt. There are five pairs of S-shaped gill slits. The pelvic fins are narrow and triangular.

The whip-like tail bears two very slender stinging spines on the upper surface; it is fairly broad and flattened at the base and tapers evenly past the stings. Behind the stings are well-developed dorsal and ventral fin folds; the dorsal fold is smaller than the ventral fold, which is deep and short relative to the tail's total length. The only dermal denticles are four or five small, closely spaced thorns in a midline row behind the spiracles. The upper surface of the disc is yellowish brown, deepening in color towards the margins, with numerous dark orange and light blue spots; the orange spots are smaller, more sharply defined, and densest at the center of the disc, whereas the blue spots are larger, less well defined, and evenly distributed over the disc. There is a darker mask-like marking across the eyes as in other Neotrygon species, though it may be hard to discern. The tail has alternating black and white bands behind the stings. The underside is pale. This species reaches a disc width of 30 cm (12 in).

== Distribution and habitat ==
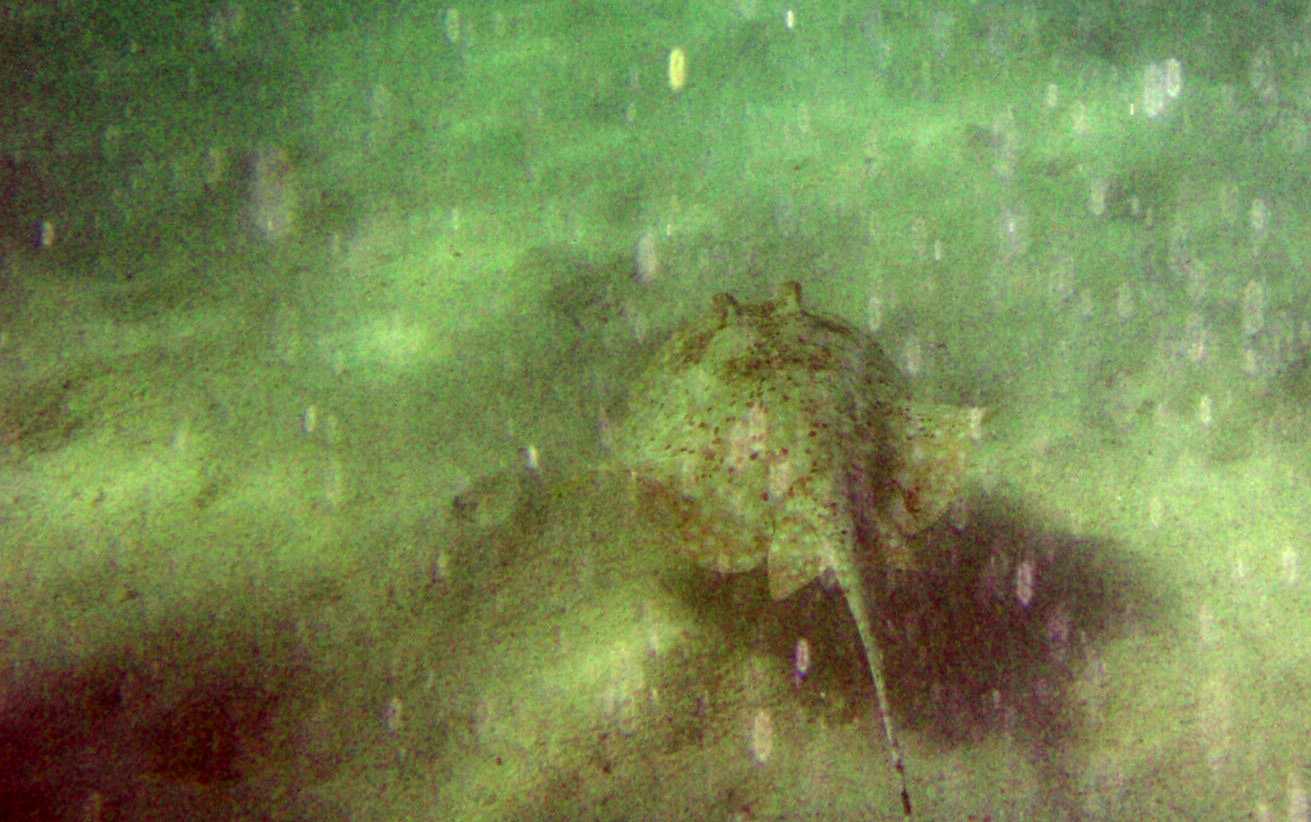
The protruding eyes of the Ningaloo maskray allow it to see while deeply buried.

Endemic to northwestern Australia, the Ningaloo maskray has been found from Shark Bay in Western Australia to the Gove Peninsula in Northern Territory. This bottom-dwelling species appears to have very restricted habitat preferences: it inhabits areas of fine reddish sand close to reefs, in inshore waters less than 5 m (16 ft) deep.

== Biology and ecology ==
Compared to other maskrays, the Ningaloo maskray has more protruding eyes that allow it to bury itself deeper in the substrate and still remain aware of its surroundings. Within its favored habitat, its coloration makes it well camouflaged against predators.

== Human interactions ==
Because it lives in such shallow waters, the Ningaloo maskray is generally not susceptible to fisheries. Conversely, its narrow habitat preferences may render it vulnerable to habitat degradation. This species is protected to some extent as its range includes the World Heritage Sites of Ningaloo Reef and Shark Bay. The International Union for Conservation of Nature (IUCN) presently lacks sufficient data to assess its conservation status.
