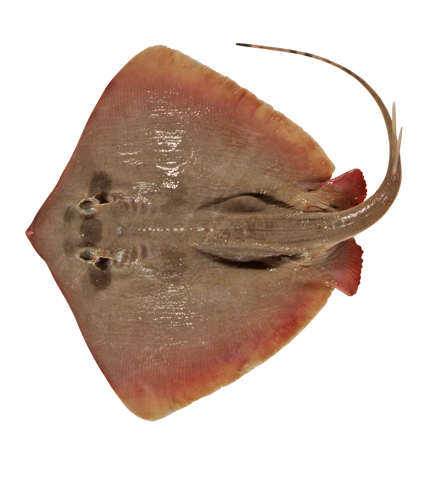

Conservation status
- Near Threatened (IUCN 3.1)

Scientific classification
- Kingdom: Animalia
- Phylum: Chordata
- Class: Chondrichthyes
- Subclass: Elasmobranchii
- Order: Myliobatiformes
- Family: Dasyatidae
- Genus: Neotrygon
- Species: N. annotata

Binomial name
- Neotrygon annotata (Last, 1987)
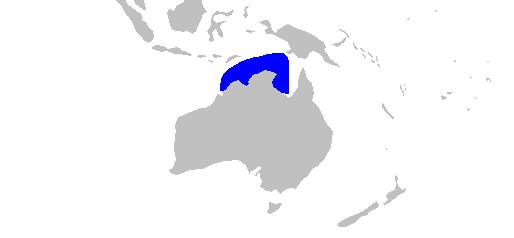
- Range of the plain maskray

Synonyms
- Dasyatis annotatus Last, 1987

= Plain maskray =

Species of cartilaginous fish

The plain maskray (Neotrygon annotata) or brown stingray, is a species of stingray in the family Dasyatidae. It is found in shallow, soft-bottomed habitats off northern Australia. Reaching 24 cm (9.4 in) in width, this species has a diamond-shaped, grayish green pectoral fin disc. Its short, whip-like tail has alternating black and white bands with fin folds above and below. There are short rows of thorns on the back and the base of the tail, but otherwise the skin is smooth. While this species possesses the dark mask-like pattern across its eyes common to its genus, it is not ornately patterned like other maskrays.

Benthic in nature, the plain maskray feeds mainly on caridean shrimp and polychaete worms, and to a lesser extent on small bony fishes. It is viviparous, with females producing litters of one or two young that are nourished during gestation via histotroph ("uterine milk"). This species lacks economic value but is caught incidentally in bottom trawls, which it is thought to be less able to withstand than other maskrays due to its gracile build. As it also has a limited distribution and low fecundity, the International Union for Conservation of Nature (IUCN) has listed it as Near Threatened.

== Taxonomy and phylogeny ==
The first scientific description of the plain maskray was authored by Commonwealth Scientific and Industrial Research Organisation (CSIRO) researcher Peter Last in a 1987 issue of Memoirs of the National Museum of Victoria. The specific name annotatus comes from the Latin an ("not") and notatus ("marked"), and refers to the ray's coloration. The holotype is a male 21.2 cm (8.3 in) across, caught off Western Australia; several paratypes were also designated. Last tentatively placed the species in the genus Dasyatis, noting that it belonged to the "maskray" species group that also included the bluespotted stingray (then Dasyatis kuhlii). In 2008, Last and William White elevated the kuhlii group to the rank of full genus as Neotrygon, on the basis of morphological and molecular phylogenetic evidence.

- - Taeniura lymma
  - - Neotrygon annotata
    - - Neotrygon ningalooensis
      - - - Neotrygon leylandi
          - Neotrygon picta
        - Neotrygon kuhlii complex

Phylogenetic tree of Neotrygon.

In a 2012 phylogenetic analysis based on mitochondrial and nuclear DNA, the plain maskray and the Ningaloo maskray (N. ningalooensis) were found to be the most basal members of Neotrygon. The divergence of the N. annotata lineage was estimated to have occurred ~54 Ma. Furthermore, the individuals sequenced in the study sorted into two genetically distinct clades, suggesting that N. annotata is a cryptic species complex. The two putative species were estimated to have diverged ~4.9 Ma; the precipitating event was likely the splitting of the ancestral population by coastline changes.

== Description ==
The pectoral fin disc of the plain maskray is thin and diamond-shaped with narrowly rounded outer corners, measuring 1.1–1.3 times longer than wide. The leading margins of the disc are gently concave and converge at a broad angle to the pointed tip of the snout. The small eyes are placed close together, and behind them are the spiracles. The nostrils are elongated and have a skirt-shaped flap of skin between them. The small mouth bears prominent furrows at the corners and contains two slender papillae on the floor. Small papillae are also found around the outside of the mouth. There are five pairs of gill slits. The pelvic fins are fairly large and pointed.

The tail is short, barely exceeding the length of the disc when intact, and has a broad and flattened base leading to usually two stinging spines. After the stings, the tail becomes slender and bears a long ventral fin fold and a much shorter, lower dorsal fin fold. Most of the body lacks dermal denticles; a midline row of 4–13 small, closely spaced thorns is present behind the spiracles, and another row of 0–4 thorns before the stings. The dorsal coloration is grayish green, becoming pinkish towards the disc margins; there is a dark mask-like shape around the eyes and a pair of small dark blotches behind the spiracles. The tail behind the stings has alternating black and white bands of variable width, ending with black at the tip. The underside is plain white and the ventral fin fold is light grayish in color. This species grows to 24 cm (9.4 in) across and 45 cm (18 in) long.

== Distribution and habitat ==
The plain maskray inhabits the continental shelf of northern Australia from the Wellesley Islands in Queensland to the Bonaparte Archipelago in Western Australia, including the Gulf of Carpentaria and the Timor and Arafura Seas. There are unsubstantiated reports that its range extends to southern Papua New Guinea. It is the least common of the several maskray species native to the region. This species is a bottom-dweller that prefers habitats with fine sediment. It has been recorded from between 12 and 62 m (39 and 203 ft) deep, and tends to be found farther away from shore than other maskrays in its range.

== Biology and ecology ==
The plain maskray generally hunts at the surface of the bottom substrate, rather than digging for prey. Its diet consists predominantly of caridean shrimp and polychaete worms. Small bony fishes are also eaten, along with the occasional penaeid prawn or amphipod. Larger rays consume a greater variety of prey and relatively more polychaete worms when compared to smaller rays. This species is parasitized by the tapeworm Acanthobothrium jonesi.

Like other stingrays, the plain maskray is viviparous with the developing embryos sustained to term by histotroph ("uterine milk") produced by the mother. Mature females have a single functional ovary and uterus, on the left. Litter size is one or two; the newborns measure 12–14 cm (4.7–5.5 in) across. Males and females reach sexual maturity at disc widths of 20–21 cm (7.9–8.3 in) and 18–19 cm (7.1–7.5 in) respectively. The maximum lifespan is estimated to be 9 years for males and 13 years for females.

== Human interactions ==
The main conservation threat to the plain maskray is incidental capture by commercial bottom trawl fisheries. In the present day, this is mostly caused by Australia's Northern Prawn Fishery, which operates throughout its range. Although this species is discarded when caught, it is more delicate-bodied than other maskrays and is thus unlikely to survive encounters with trawling gear. Historically, this species may also have been negatively affected by Japanese, Chinese, and Taiwanese trawlers that fished intensively off northern Australia from 1959 to 1990. These factors, coupled with the plain maskray's limited distribution and low reproductive rate, have resulted in its being assessed as Near Threatened by the International Union for Conservation of Nature (IUCN).
