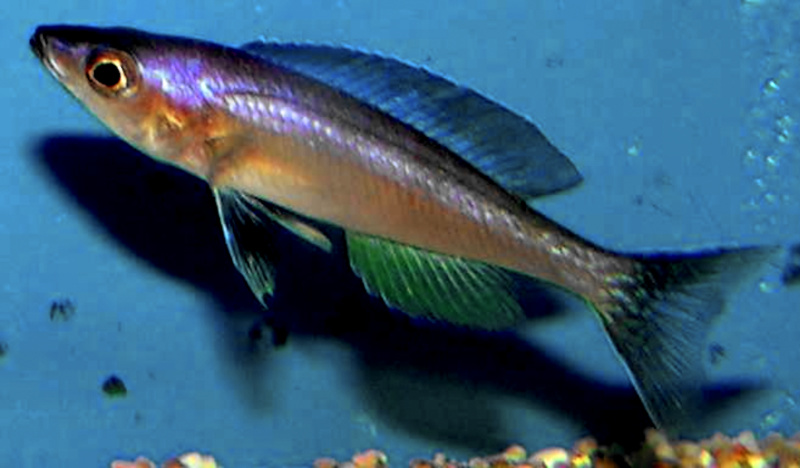
- Cyprichromis leptosoma

Scientific classification
- Kingdom: Animalia
- Phylum: Chordata
- Class: Actinopterygii
- Division: Teleostei
- Order: Cichliformes
- Family: Cichlidae
- Subfamily: Pseudocrenilabrinae
- Tribe: Cyprichromini; Poll, 1986

Genera
- Cyprichromis; Paracyprichromis

= Cyprichromini =

Tribe of fishes

Cyprichromini is a tribe of African cichlids, containing seven species in two genera: Cyprichromis and Paracyprichromis. Most of the species are endemic to Lake Tanganyika; only C. microlepidotus has also been seen in eastern Tanzania.

The members of this tribe are small elongated fish found in schools in open waters where they feed on plankton. They are mouthbrooders.
