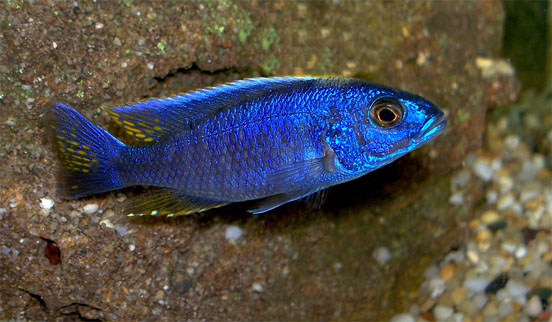

Conservation status
- Least Concern (IUCN 3.1)

Scientific classification
- Kingdom: Animalia
- Phylum: Chordata
- Class: Actinopterygii
- Order: Cichliformes
- Family: Cichlidae
- Genus: Sciaenochromis
- Species: S. fryeri

Binomial name
- Sciaenochromis fryeri Konings, 1993

= Sciaenochromis fryeri =

Species of fish

Sciaenochromis fryeri is a species of cichlid endemic to Lake Malawi, where it is found along the rocky coastal areas at depths of 10 to 40 metres (33 to 131 ft). This is the bright-blue fish widely sold in the aquarium trade as the "electric blue hap", a common name also applied to the lighter blue and much less common Sciaenochromis ahli. This fish can reach a length of 11.5 centimetres (4.5 in) SL. The specific name honours Geoffrey Fryer (b. 1927) who was Fisheries Research Officer, Joint Fisheries Research Organisation of Northern Rhodesia and Nyasaland.
