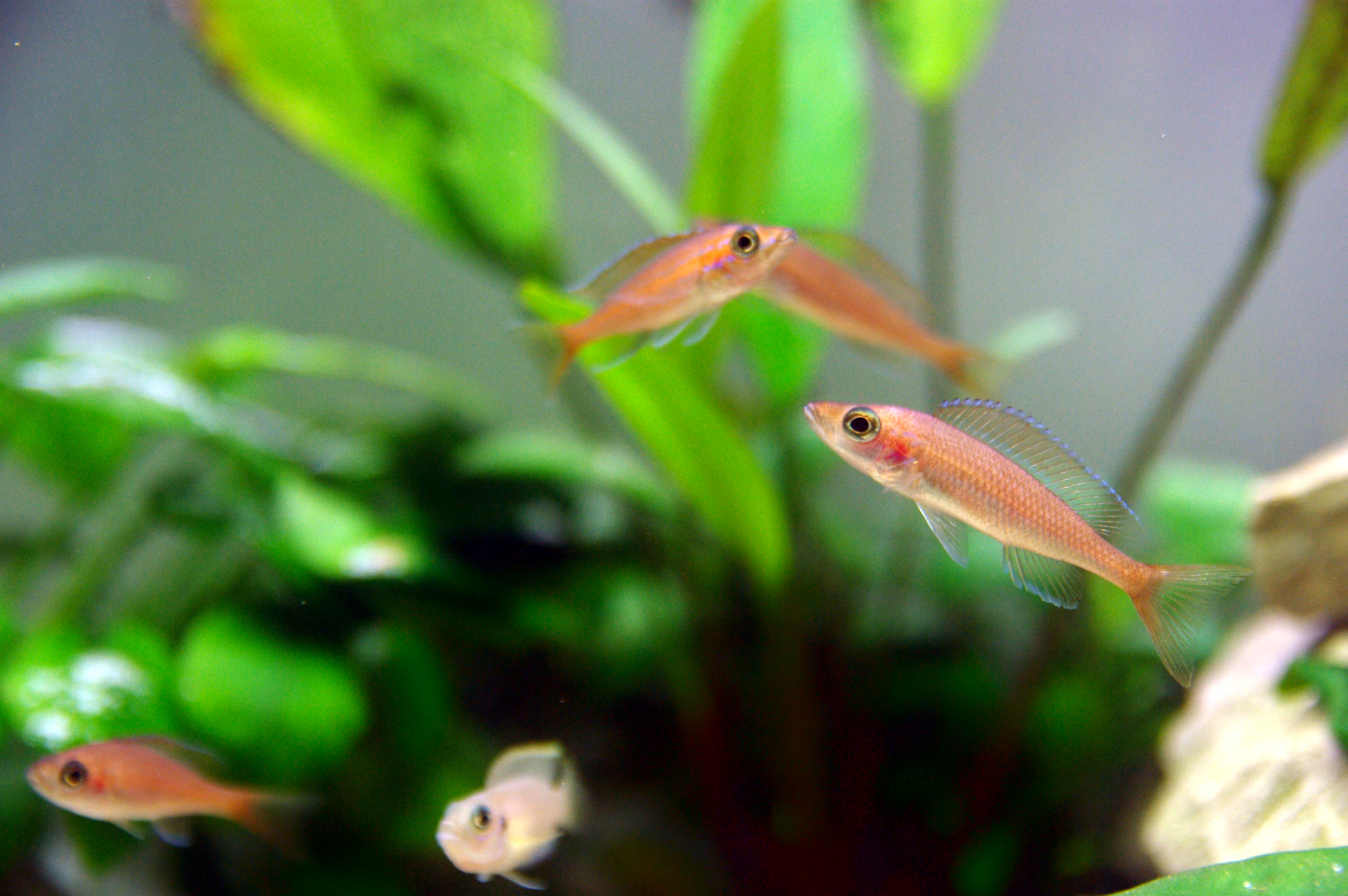

Conservation status
- Least Concern (IUCN 3.1)

Scientific classification
- Kingdom: Animalia
- Phylum: Chordata
- Class: Actinopterygii
- Order: Cichliformes
- Family: Cichlidae
- Genus: Paracyprichromis
- Species: P. nigripinnis

Binomial name
- Paracyprichromis nigripinnis (Boulenger, 1901)

Synonyms
- Paratilapia nigripinnis Boulenger, 1901; Cyprichromis nigripinnis (Boulenger, 1901); Limnochromis nigripinnis (Boulenger, 1901)

= Paracyprichromis nigripinnis =

Species of fish

Paracyprichromis nigripinnis is a species of cichlid endemic to Lake Tanganyika where it is only known from the northern end of the lake. It can reach a length of 11 centimetres (4.3 in) TL. This species can also be found in the aquarium trade.
