= Neotrygon orientalis =

Conservation status
- Least Concern (IUCN 3.1)

Scientific classification
- Kingdom: Animalia
- Phylum: Chordata
- Class: Chondrichthyes
- Subclass: Elasmobranchii
- Order: Myliobatiformes
- Family: Dasyatidae
- Genus: Neotrygon
- Species: N. orientalis

Binomial name
- Neotrygon orientalis Last, White & Serét, 2016

Species of fish

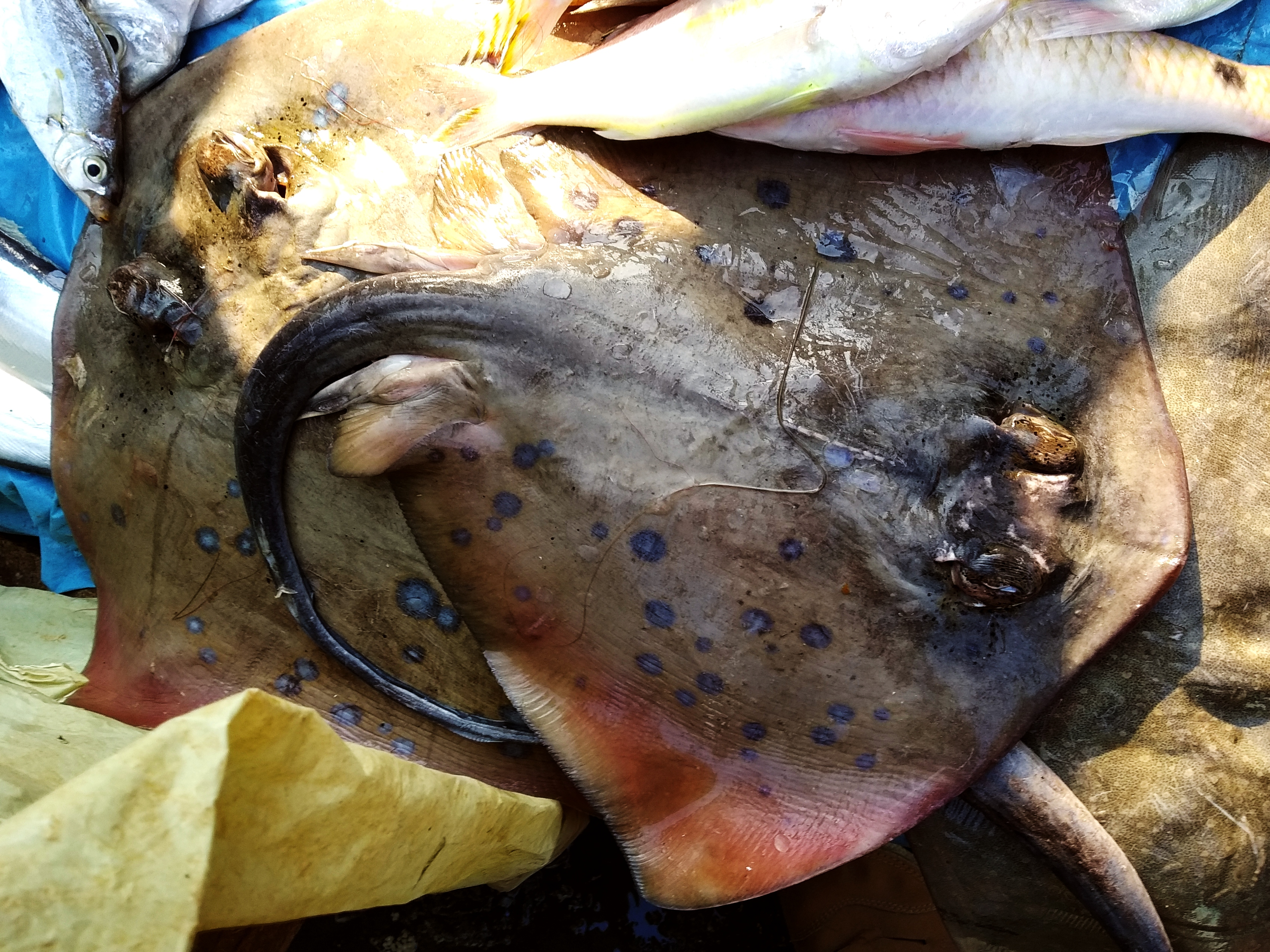
Neotrygon orientalis, sold at the Labuan fish market in Pandeglang, Banten, Indonesia.

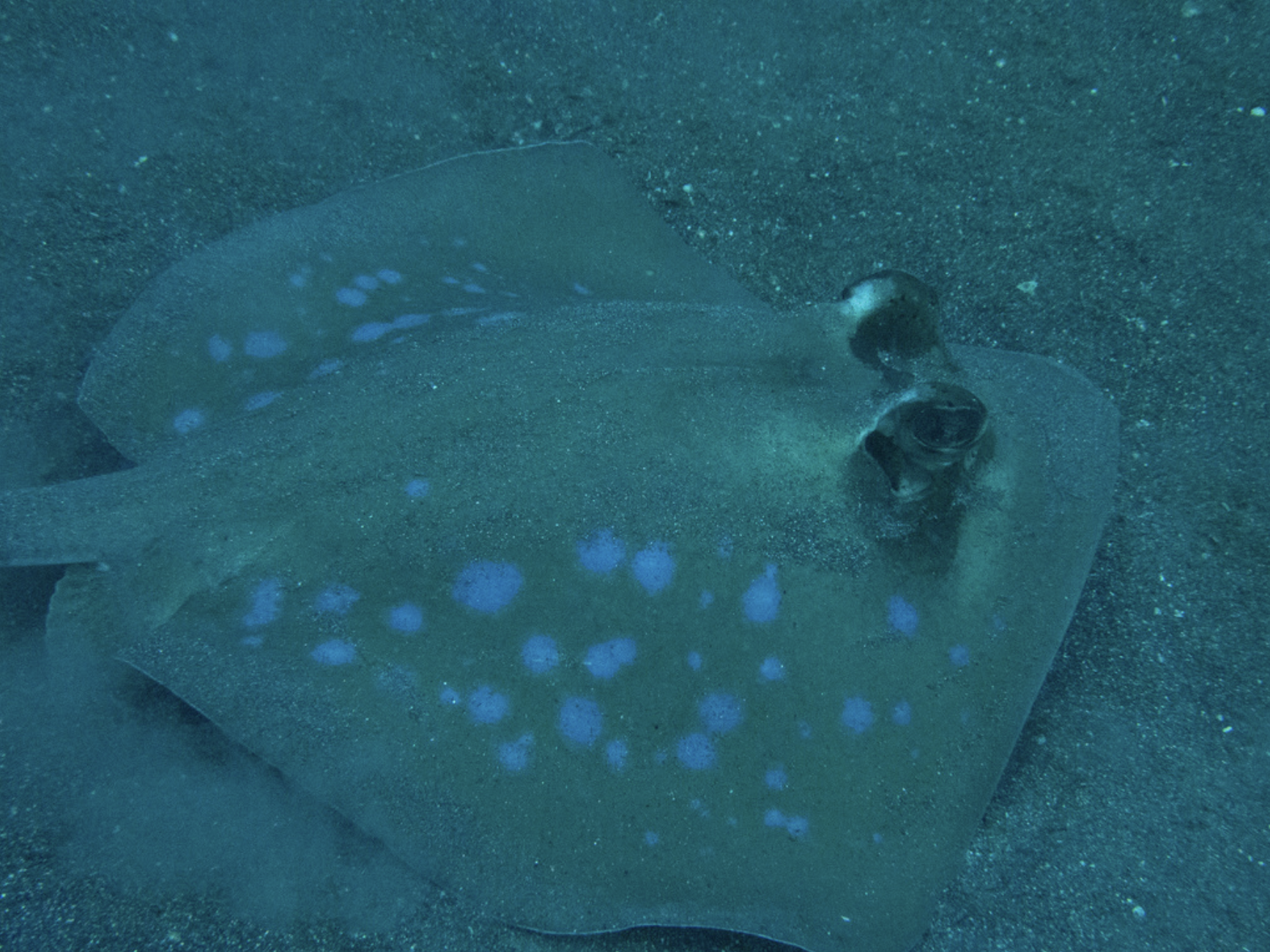
The Oriental Bluespotted Maskray in Indonesian waters, near the bottom (benthic) layer of the Ocean

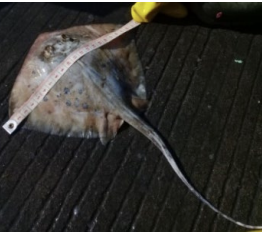
The wingspan of a Neotrygon orientalis being measured to determine population growth rate.

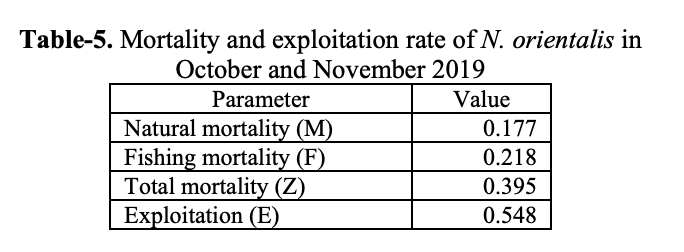
Looking at how the Fisheries and their exploitation of these rays may impact their lives, and how the exploitation rate and mortality are correlated potentially.

Neotrygon orientalis, the Oriental bluespotted maskray, is a type of whiptail stingray found mainly in Indonesia, Malaysia, Philippines, and Taiwan. It has also caused the description of a new diphyllidean species, the Echinobothrium ivanovae species, has been described from N. orientalis.

== Description ==
This species can be distinguished from its closest congener (Neotrygon kuhlii) through several characteristics, such as abruptly angular pectoral apices, dusky ventral tail fold with darker edge, small mouth, pronounced mask-like markings, and covered with moderate-sized blue spots and dark peppery spots. The maximum size for the male specimens is 38 cm disc width (DW).It is often confused with the newly described Neotrygon yakkoei and the Neotrygon khulli complex. The high morphological similarities among the species make species of the Khulli complex hard to identify. Phylogenetically, N. orientalis and N. varidens form a sister clade to the species N. indica, which may have a common ancestor in the Plio-Pleistocene.

== Habitat & distribution ==
This species distribution range encompasses the regions of Sumatra, Java, Kalimantan, and Sulawesi in Indonesia; Sabah and Sarawak in Malaysia; Singapore; Brunei; Philippines; and Taiwan. These areas include the Western Central and Northwest Pacific. It inhabits the inshore habitats and ranges from the surface to a depth of around 100 m. This species is often caught and retained as delicacy in some regions of its distribution range, namely the Bajau and Laut communities in Indonesia-Malaysia-Philippines. Its true distribution is not entirely clear because of its similarities to other species in the Khulli complex.

=== Identification Issues and Solutions ===
Snout angle, something historically used to distinguish N. orientalis from N. kuhlii, has now been discontinued due to the subjectivity of the testing. However, the Oriental Bluespotted Maskray has been accurately identified using spot patterns, tail characteristics and sex at three different sites in Malaysian waters by BRUVS (Baited remote underwater video systems). BRUVS provides more accuracy than before for population estimates. It has also been confused with the newly described N. indica.

N. orientalis has now been given a distinct BIN number, a DNA barcode that helps with identifying this species where it could not be identified otherwise.

== Life History and Growth Patterns ==
=== Sex Ratio and Growth Rates ===
The average sex ratio for males to females is 1.4: 1. N. orientalis has a negative allometric growth pattern, where its length increases at a faster pace than its weight growth.

Both male and female N. orientalis have slow growth rates, with males needing approximately 60 weeks to reach maximum length, and females needing approximately 56 weeks for the same. Their growth rate is impacted by the environment, most strongly temperature and food. However, they are still able to grow even in unfavorable environments.

=== Reproduction and Age ===
Reproduction is viviparous and size at birth is approximately 12 cm DW.

It is unclear the actual maximum age of this species, but based on a similar one, the Coral Sea Maskray (Neotrygon trinoides), it is approximately 12 years.

== Conservation Status ==
The Oriental Bluespotted Maskray has been most recently assessed in 2020, with an amendment in 2022 from the IUCN Red List of Threatened Species. It still identified as a species of least concern, with the potential to either grow larger in population or smaller due to anthropogenic impacts. The current population trend is noted as stable.

=== Mesopredators and Fishing on the Conservation and Population Control of N. Orientalis ===
N. orientalis is targeted and taken as a bycatch in large numbers. Its main use is meat, which is eaten fresh or salted and dried before being used for consumption. An example of this is Nusantara Fishery Port; one of the largest fisheries in Indonesia. At this fishery, they are often the bycatch of Demersal fish species such as Kurisi.They are caught through a handful of methods, including trawl, longline, handline, gill net, trammel and harpoon. However, populations still seem to be stable or rising because of mesopredator release due to declining shark populations. Essentially, because the predator that used to consume them no longer consumes them, N. orientalis can populate at higher levels than before. Therefore, despite the fact that they are used in many industries, their overall population levels are not decreasing, though this varies in each individual population with where they are located.

=== Growth Overfishing ===
Species in the Neotrygon genus as a whole comprise at least 8 percent of all rays in official fishery reports. Based on the amount of illegal fishing that is present, the numbers are predicted to be far higher than that. Furthermore, specific areas of their habitat are threatened by overfishing, where the number of fish dying from natural causes is lower than those dying from fishing, leading to the "Growth Overfishing" phenomenon, where there are very few mature fish because they are fished and caught before they can grow. This indicates the potential risk that growth overfishing may cause in the many areas where the species is present, though this has only been researched at a specific fishery in Indonesia.

Other potential things that might affect the population level include extensive habitat degradation (due to its inshore presence) and pollution. Furthermore, large coastal areas, like mangroves in Indonesia have been lost to land conversion for urban development and other human activities, decreasing N. orientalis's potential range and habitat areas even more. This is exacerbated by global climate change and coral bleaching continuing to cause more area loss and species extinction.
