= Paracyprichromis brieni =

Conservation status
- Least Concern (IUCN 3.1)

Scientific classification
- Kingdom: Animalia
- Phylum: Chordata
- Class: Actinopterygii
- Order: Cichliformes
- Family: Cichlidae
- Genus: Paracyprichromis
- Species: P. brieni

Binomial name
- Paracyprichromis brieni (Poll, 1981)

Synonyms
- Cyprichromis brieni Poll, 1981

Species of fish

Paracyprichromis brieni is a species of cichlid endemic to Lake Tanganyika where it is only known to occur in the northernmost portion of the lake. It can reach a length of 11 centimetres (4.3 in) TL. This species can also be found in the aquarium trade. The specific name honours the author, Max Poll's, friend and fellow zoologist Paul Brien (1928-1964) of the Université libre de Bruxelles.
