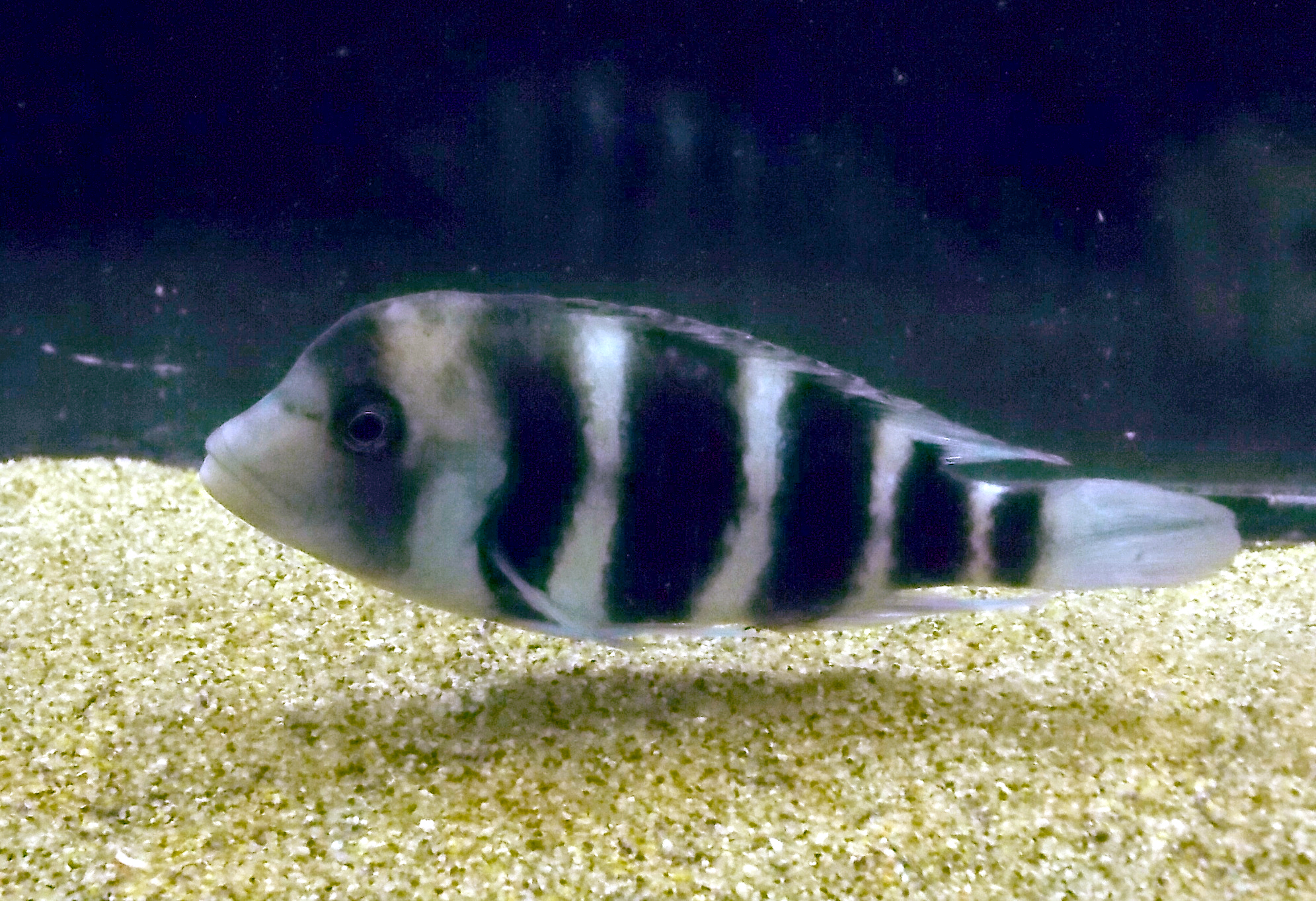

Scientific classification
- Kingdom: Animalia
- Phylum: Chordata
- Class: Actinopterygii
- Order: Cichliformes
- Family: Cichlidae
- Genus: Cyphotilapia
- Species: C. gibberosa

Binomial name
- Cyphotilapia gibberosa T. Takahashi & Nakaya, 2003

= Cyphotilapia gibberosa =

Species of fish

Cyphotilapia gibberosa is a species of fish in the cichlid family, one of two species in the genus Cyphotilapia. Native to Lake Tanganyika in East Africa, it was described in 2003 nearly 100 years after its congener, C. frontosa. This species is a maternal mouth brooder.

== Distribution ==
Cyphotilapia gibberosa is endemic to Lake Tanganyika in East Africa like C. frontosa. It is found in the southern half of this lake, whereas C. frontosa inhabits the northern half. The type specimen of C. gibberosa was caught at a depth of 34 m (112 ft) and large schools occur at 30–40 m (98–131 ft) or deeper.
