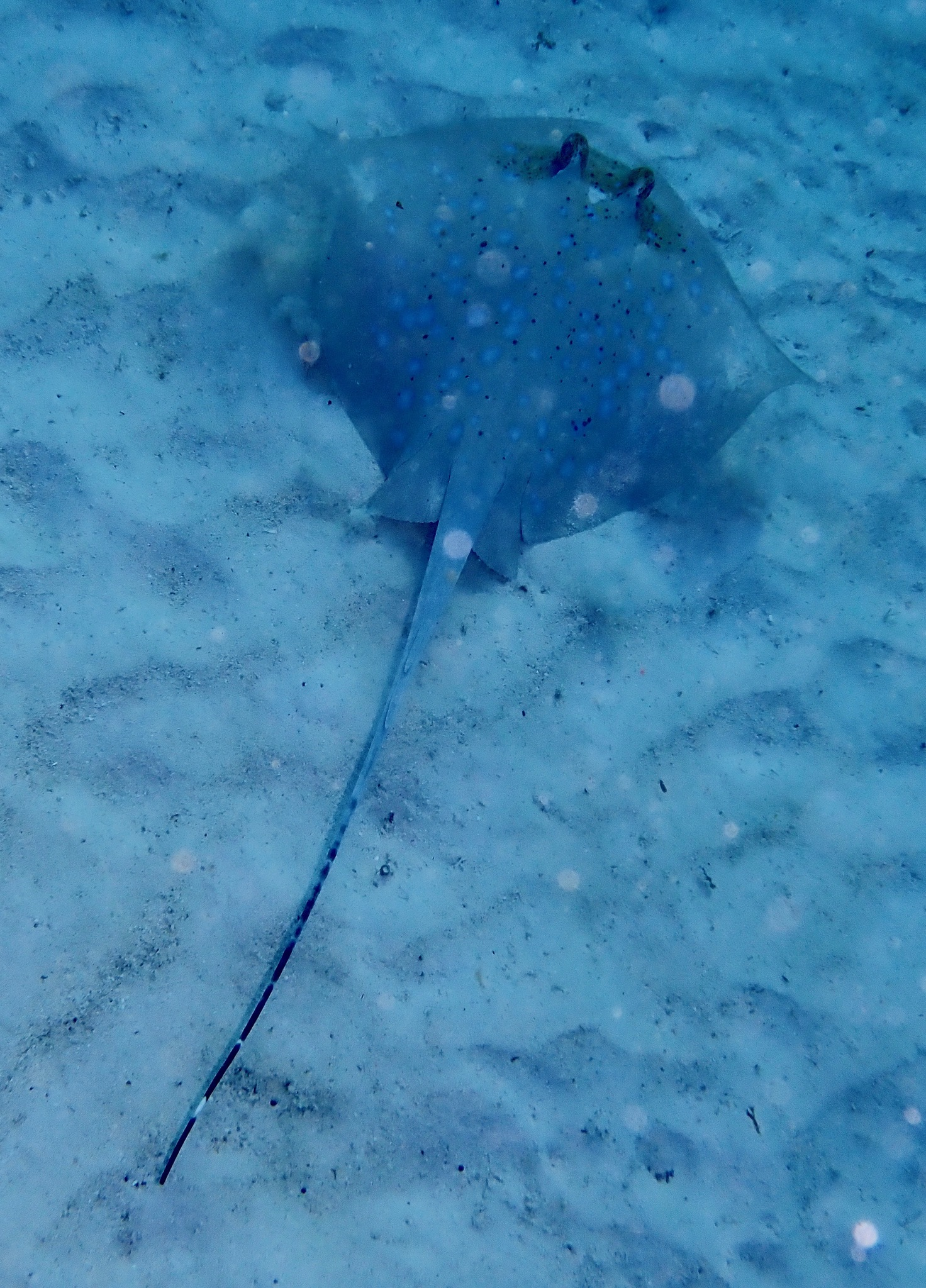

Conservation status
- Near Threatened (IUCN 3.1)

Scientific classification
- Kingdom: Animalia
- Phylum: Chordata
- Class: Chondrichthyes
- Subclass: Elasmobranchii
- Order: Myliobatiformes
- Family: Dasyatidae
- Genus: Neotrygon
- Species: N. australiae

Binomial name
- Neotrygon australiae Last, White & Serét, 2016

= Neotrygon australiae =

Species of whiptail stingray

Neotrygon australiae, the Australian bluespotted maskray, is a type of whiptail stingray found mainly in Australia, Indonesia, and Papua New Guinea. This species is often caught by local trawlers and might be retained for local delicacy in Indonesia and Papua New Guinea.

== Description ==
This species can be distinguished from its closest congener (Neotrygon kuhlii) through several characteristics, namely much broader disc, narrowly angular pectoral apices, rounded or weakly angular fleshy snout, entirely dark ventral tail fold, very long tail with black-white bars on the rear, reddish brown to greenish body color, and covered with large blue spots and small peppery dark spots. The maximum size for the female specimens is 45.2 cm disc width (DW).

== Habitat & distribution ==
This species distribution range encompasses Northern Territory, Western Australia, and Queensland in Australia;Lesser Sunda Islands and southern Papua in Indonesia; Timor-Leste; and Papua New Guinea. It inhabits the inshore habitats and ranges from the surface to a depth of around 90 m. It is also caught, either as target or bycatch, by local fisheries and will likely be used for human consumption in the regions of Indonesia and Papua New Guinea, although it is not known to be retained in Australia.
