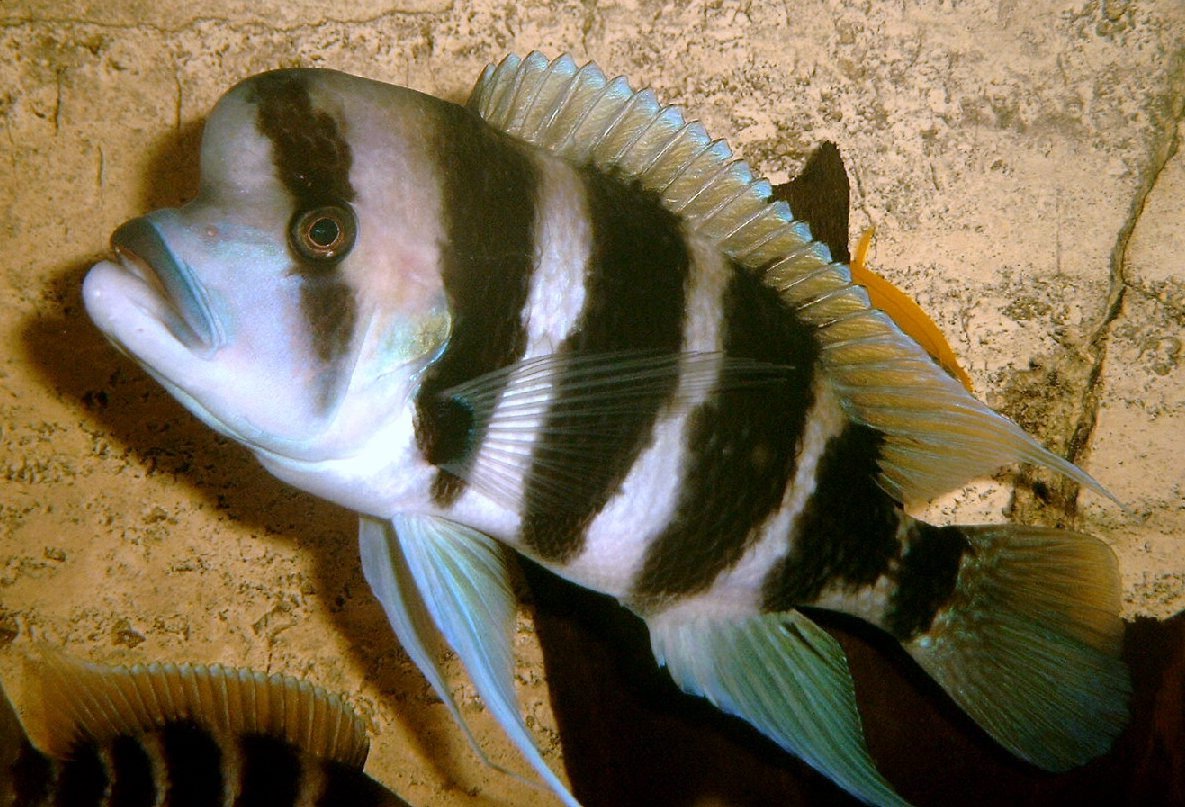
- Humphead cichlid (C. frontosa)
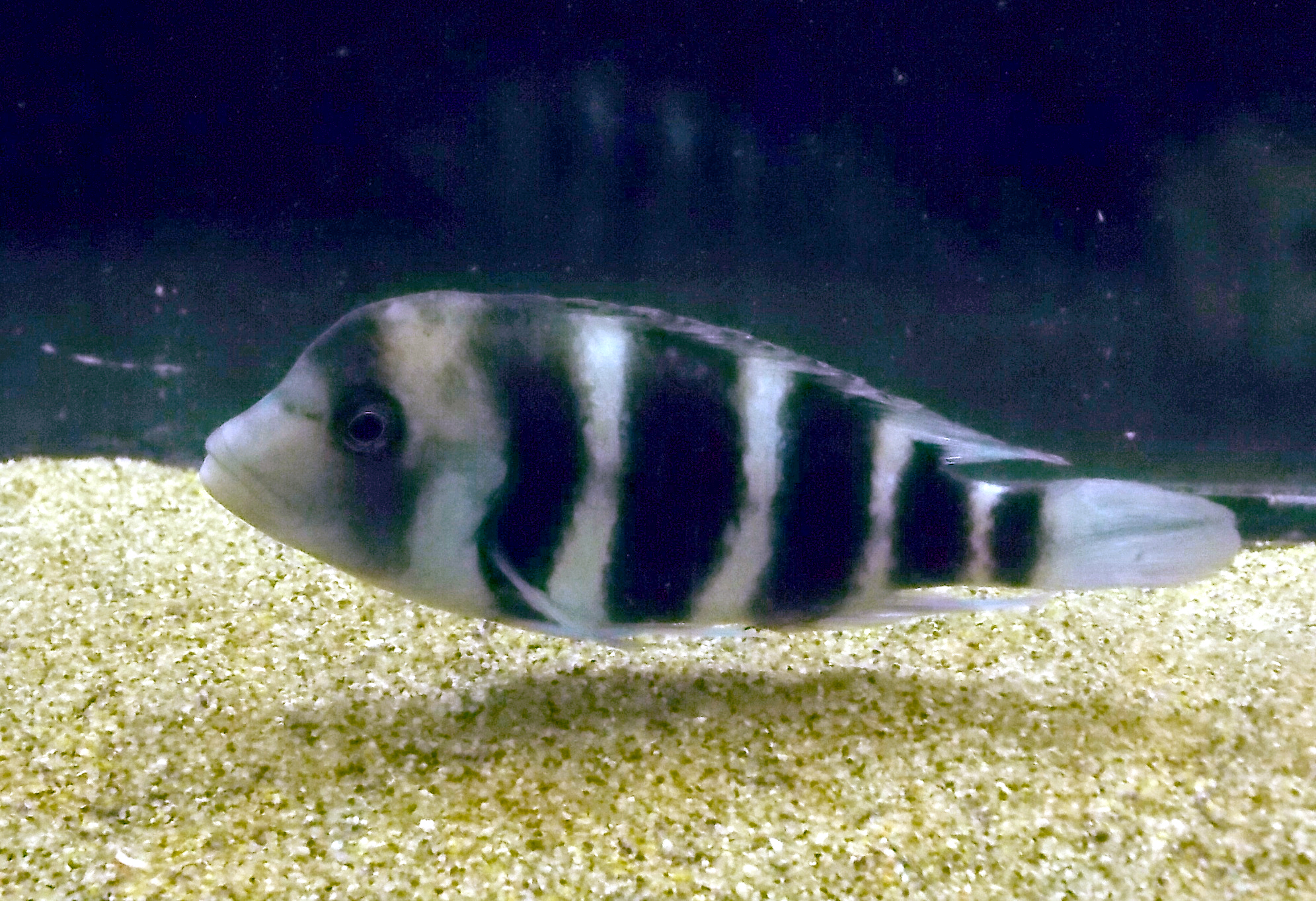
- Cyphotilapia gibberosa

Scientific classification
- Kingdom: Animalia
- Phylum: Chordata
- Class: Actinopterygii
- Order: Cichliformes
- Family: Cichlidae
- Subfamily: Pseudocrenilabrinae
- Tribe: Cyphotilapini; Takahashi, 2003
- Genus: Cyphotilapia; Regan, 1920

Type species
- Paratilapia frontosa Boulenger, 1906

= Cyphotilapia =

Genus of fishes

Cyphotilapia is a small genus of African cichlids endemic to Lake Tanganyika, with C. frontosa being roughly confined to the northern half of the lake and C. gibberosa roughly to the southern half. They have a distinctly banded pattern, bulbous foreheads when mature and can reach up to 33 cm (1.1 feet) in length.

These are a mouth-brooding cichlid with a rather small batch of fry each spawn. The mother will hold the fry in her mouth for about 3–4 weeks before finally releasing about 30-70 fry. These are slow-growing fish, which take up to 6 years to reach sexual maturity. They can live for up to 25 years.

== Species ==
There are currently two recognized species in this genus:

- Cyphotilapia frontosa (Boulenger, 1906) (Humphead cichlid)
- Cyphotilapia gibberosa T. Takahashi & Nakaya, 2003
