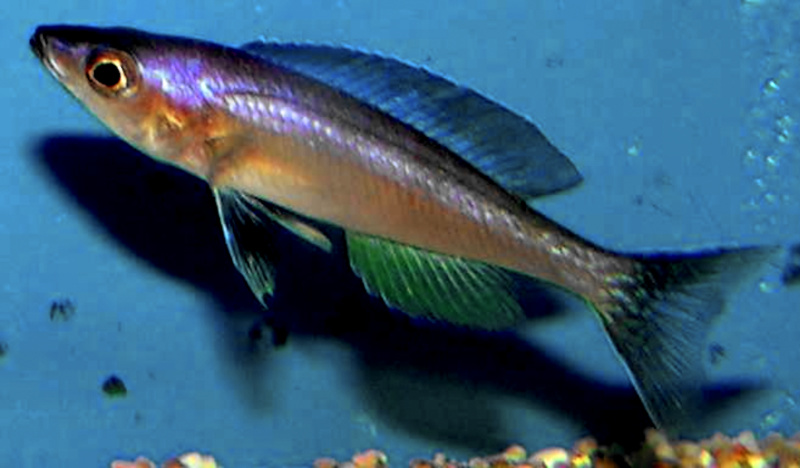

Conservation status
- Least Concern (IUCN 3.1)

Scientific classification
- Kingdom: Animalia
- Phylum: Chordata
- Class: Actinopterygii
- Order: Cichliformes
- Family: Cichlidae
- Genus: Cyprichromis
- Species: C. leptosoma

Binomial name
- Cyprichromis leptosoma (Boulenger, 1898)

Synonyms
- Paratilapia leptosoma Boulenger, 1898; Limnochromis leptosoma (Boulenger, 1898)

= Cyprichromis leptosoma =

Species of fish

Cyprichromis leptosoma is a mouthbrooding species of fish in the family Cichlidae. It is endemic to Lake Tanganyika in Zambia and Tanzania. It seems quite common within its range and faces no particular threats, so the International Union for Conservation of Nature has assessed its conservation status as being of least concern.

== Description ==
It is a streamlined fish with a silvery to blue body color. It grows to about 3 in (8 cm) in length. The males have either yellow or blue tails. The mouth is protrusible and forms a suction tube which is used for sucking in pelagic zooplankton.

== Ecology ==
C. leptosoma, like other fish in its genus, has an unusual breeding strategy. Males form a three-dimensional lek in mid-water. Females decide which males they want to mate with. If a female chooses to mate with a particular male, they will release an egg, which the male fertilizes in midwater. The female catches the egg in her mouth without the egg hitting the ground. The female protects and broods the eggs in her mouth until the fry hatch and are able to swim on their own. This takes about three weeks. At that point, the female releases the eggs into a rocky area for the fry's protection, and leaves them there on their own.

C. leptosoma is a schooling species that lives in deep water. It is subject to several predators within Lake Tanganyika. The most prominent is Cyphotilapia frontosa, which lives in deep water most of the time, but comes up to feed on C. leptosoma primarily at dawn.

== Distribution ==
C. leptosoma is endemic to Lake Tanganyika from the southern part in Zambia and along the eastern shoreline into Tanzania.
