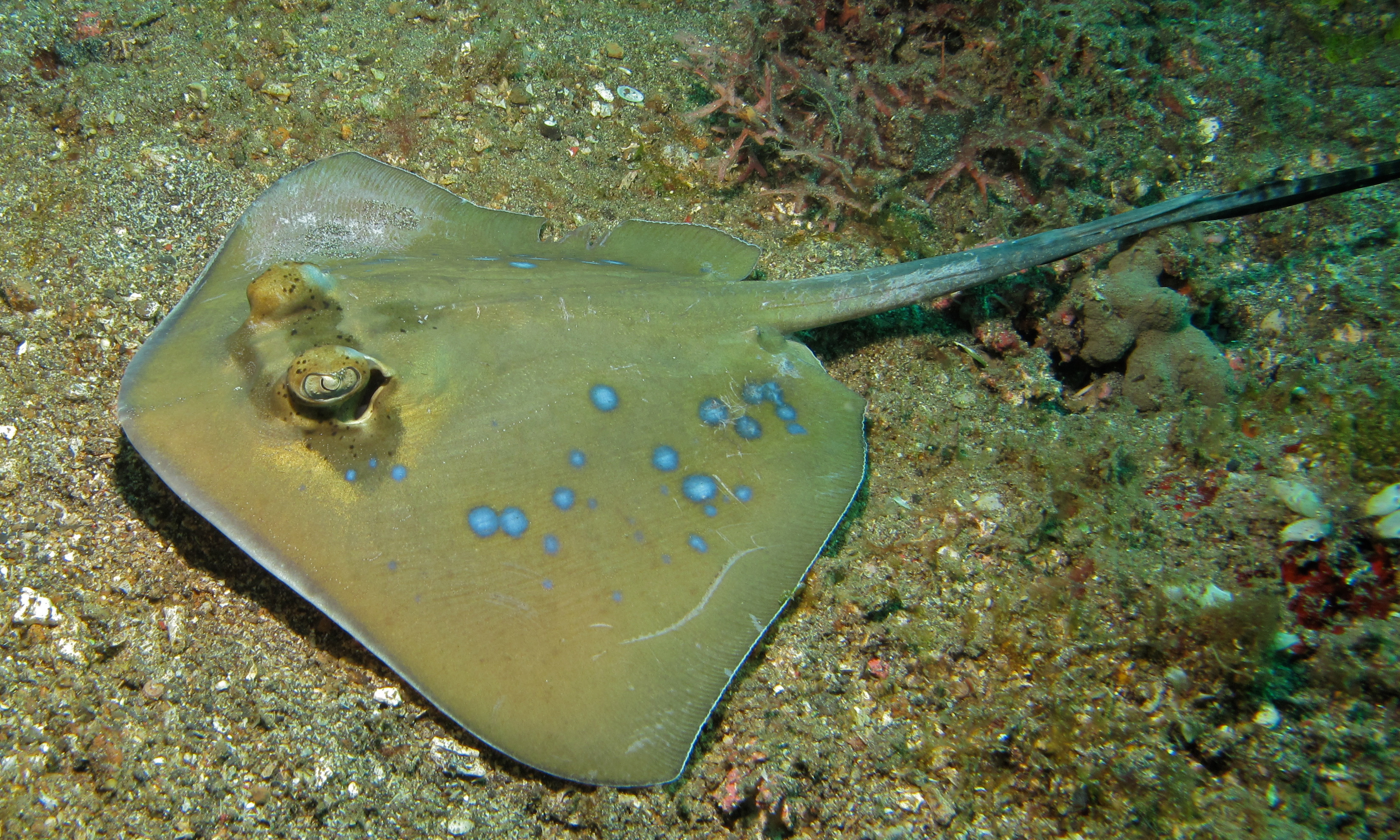
- Neotrygon kuhlii

Scientific classification
- Kingdom: Animalia
- Phylum: Chordata
- Class: Chondrichthyes
- Subclass: Elasmobranchii
- Order: Myliobatiformes
- Family: Dasyatidae
- Subfamily: Neotrygoninae
- Genus: Neotrygon; Castelnau, 1873

Type species
- Raya trigonoides (New Caledonian maskray) Castelnau, 1873

= Maskray =

Genus of cartilaginous fishes

Neotrygon is a genus of stingrays in the family Dasyatidae commonly known as the maskrays, native to the Indo-West Pacific. They are so named because of a distinctive color pattern around their eyes, resembling a mask. The species in this genus were originally placed in the genus Dasyatis by most authors. However, recent morphological and molecular analyses have conclusively showed that they represent a distinct group and so the genus Neotrygon was resurrected for them.

Aside from their mask-like color pattern, the maskrays are variable in coloration and can be plain or ornate. Their pectoral fin discs are largely smooth, with a single row of thorns along the dorsal midline. The mouth is small with two central papillae and a row of enlarged, long-cusped teeth halfway along the upper jaw on both sides. The nasal curtain, formed by the merging of the nasal flaps, is long and narrow. The tail is very short with well-developed dorsal and ventral fin folds and a filamentous tip, and is banded black and white past the stinging spine. In addition, Neotrygon species also differ from other stingrays in their buccal and skeletal morphology, as well as in the CO1 and NADH2 gene sequences.

Within the genus Neotrygon, species can be diagnosed by their nucleotide sequence at the CO1, NADH2, and cytochrome b gene loci. Alternative diagnoses have been proposed based on morphometrics but these were shown to be invalid.

== Species ==
There are currently 17 recognized species in the genus Neotrygon:

- Neotrygon annotata (Last, 1987) (Plain maskray)
- Neotrygon australiae Last, W. T. White & Séret, 2016 (Australian bluespotted maskray)
- Neotrygon bobwardi Borsa, Arlyza, Hoareau & Shen, 2018 (Bob Ward's bluespotted maskray)
- Neotrygon caeruleopunctata Last, W. T. White & Séret, 2016 (Bluespotted maskray)
- Neotrygon indica Pavan-Kumar, Kumar, Pitale, Shen & Borsa, 2018 (Indian Ocean maskray)
- Neotrygon kuhlii (J. P. Müller & Henle, 1841) (Kuhl's stingray)
- Neotrygon leylandi (Last, 1987) (Painted maskray)
- Neotrygon malaccensis Borsa, Arlyza, Hoareau & Shen, 2018 (Malacca Strait bluespotted maskray)
- Neotrygon moluccensis Borsa, Arlyza, Hoareau & Shen, 2018 (Moluccan bluespotted maskray)
- Neotrygon ningalooensis Last, W. T. White & Puckridge, 2010 (Ningaloo maskray)
- Neotrygon orientalis Last, W. T. White & Séret, 2016 (Oriental bluespotted maskray)
- Neotrygon picta Last & W. T. White, 2008 (Speckled maskray)
- Neotrygon trigonoides (Castelnau, 1873) (New Caledonian maskray)
- Neotrygon vali Borsa, 2017 (Guadalcanal maskray)
- Neotrygon varidens (Garman, 1885) (Mahogany maskray)
- Neotrygon westpapuensis Borsa, Arlyza, Hoareau & Shen, 2018 (West Papuan bluespotted maskray)
- Neotrygon yakkoei Hata & Motomura, 2024

Neotrygon trigonoides, the type species of the genus Neotrygon, occurs on the reefs and reef-associated habitats of the Coral Sea. The holotype was collected by Castelnau in New Caledonia, hence its vernacular designation as the New Caledonian maskray. Neotrygon kuhlii (Kuhl's maskray) is known from only two specimens collected by French naturalists J.R.C. Quoy and J.P. Gaymard in Vanikoro (Santa Cruz archipelago, southwestern Pacific Ocean) in 1828, and by the watercolour of another specimen drawn by Quoy. As Kuhl's maskray superficially resembles the New Caledonian maskray, it cannot be excluded that the two species are synonymous. To test this hypothesis would require the comparison of maskray specimens from Vanikoro and the Coral Sea using genetic markers. Neotrygon indica apparently has a wide distribution in the Indian Ocean, while several other species have so far been recorded from single locations: the latter category includes Neotrygon kuhlii, so far known from Vanikoro Island only; Neotrygon westpapuensis from Biak Island in West Papua; and Neotrygon vali from Guadalcanal Island in the Solomon archipelago. Neotrygon bobwardi is distributed all along the western coast of Sumatera Island in Indonesia, from Padang to Aceh; Neotrygon malaccensis occurs in the eastern Andaman Sea and in the Malacca Strait; Neotrygon varidens occurs in the South China Sea. Neotrygon orientalis has a wide distribution spanning the western Indo-Malay archipelago and the Philippines archipelago; Neotrygon moluccensis has so far been reported from the eastern Banda Sea; Neotrygon caeruleopunctata occurs along the Indian-Ocean shores of Bali and Java Islands; Neotrygon australiae is present all along the northern coast of Australia and around Timor Island.
