= Electric Blues =

Electric Blues may refer to:

- Electric blues, any type of blues music distinguished by the use of electric amplification
- "Electric Blues", a song from the musical Hair
- "Electric Blues", a 1991 song by The Soup Dragons

== See also ==
- Electric blue (disambiguation)
