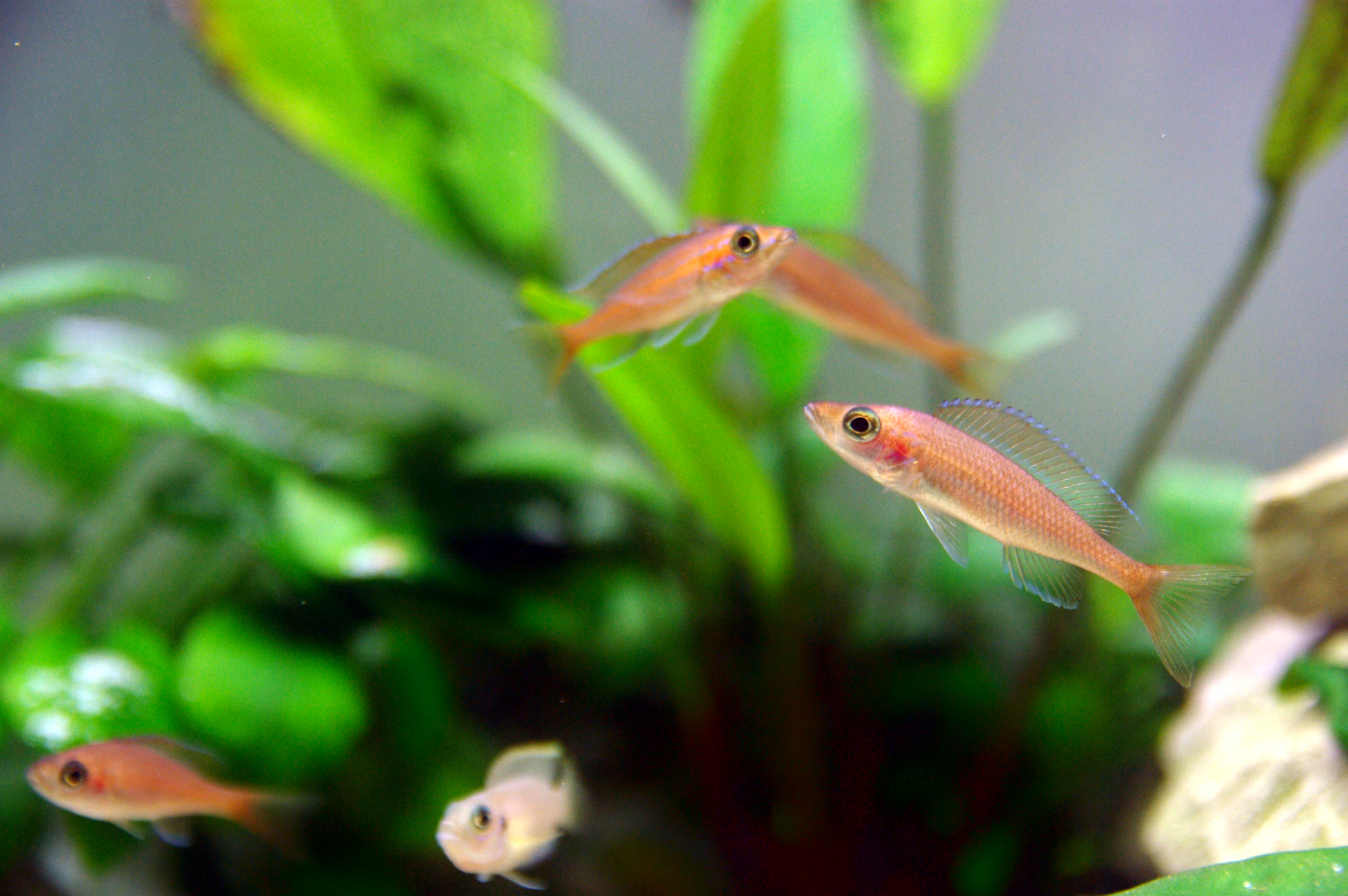
- P. nigripinnis

Scientific classification
- Kingdom: Animalia
- Phylum: Chordata
- Class: Actinopterygii
- Order: Cichliformes
- Family: Cichlidae
- Tribe: Cyprichromini
- Genus: Paracyprichromis; Poll, 1986

Type species
- Paratilapia nigripinnis Boulenger, 1901

= Paracyprichromis =

Genus of fishes

Paracyprichromis is a small genus of cichlids endemic to Lake Tanganyika in east Africa.

== Species ==
There are currently two recognized species in this genus:

- Paracyprichromis brieni (Poll, 1981)
- Paracyprichromis nigripinnis (Boulenger, 1901)
