= Sciaenochromis benthicola =

Conservation status
- Least Concern (IUCN 3.1)

Scientific classification
- Kingdom: Animalia
- Phylum: Chordata
- Class: Actinopterygii
- Order: Cichliformes
- Family: Cichlidae
- Genus: Sciaenochromis
- Species: S. benthicola

Binomial name
- Sciaenochromis benthicola Konings, 1993

Species of fish

Sciaenochromis benthicola is a species of cichlid endemic to Lake Malawi. It can reach a length of 14 centimetres (5.5 in) SL.
