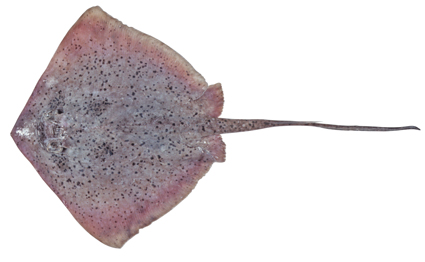

Conservation status
- Least Concern (IUCN 3.1)

Scientific classification
- Kingdom: Animalia
- Phylum: Chordata
- Class: Chondrichthyes
- Subclass: Elasmobranchii
- Order: Myliobatiformes
- Family: Dasyatidae
- Genus: Neotrygon
- Species: N. picta

Binomial name
- Neotrygon picta Last & W. T. White, 2008
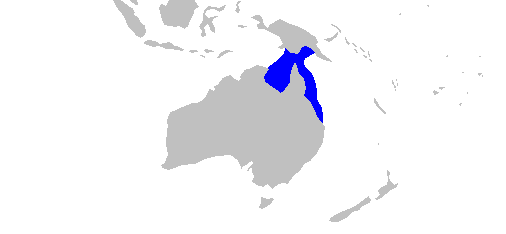
- Range of the peppered maskray

= Peppered maskray =

Species of cartilaginous fish

The peppered maskray (Neotrygon picta) or speckled maskray, is a species of stingray in the family Dasyatidae, found in shallow waters off northeastern Australia. This small, thin-bodied ray attains a maximum width of 32 cm (13 in). It has a diamond-shaped pectoral fin disc with a row of tiny thorns along the midline, and a relatively short, whip-like tail with both upper and lower fin folds. Its upper surface has a speckled color pattern consisting of black spots and brownish reticulations on a light yellow to brown background.

Favoring soft-bottomed habitats, the peppered maskray is a bottom-dwelling predator consuming mainly crustaceans (particularly caridean shrimp) and polychaete worms. It is viviparous, with litter sizes of one to three. The females supply their developing young with histotroph ("uterine milk") during gestation. Although the peppered maskray is a frequent bycatch of bottom trawl fisheries, it is still common and significant portions of its population appear to lie within unfished waters. As a result, the International Union for Conservation of Nature (IUCN) has assessed it as Least Concern.

== Taxonomy and phylogeny ==
Once thought to be a color morph of the painted maskray (N. leylandi), the peppered maskray was recognized as a distinct species based on molecular data collected for the Barcode of Life project. It was described by Peter Last and William White in a 2008 Commonwealth Scientific and Industrial Research Organisation (CSIRO) publication. Their account was based on 13 specimens; of these, a female 24 cm (9.4 in) across caught off Rockhampton, Queensland was designated as the holotype. The specific epithet picta is derived from the Latin pictus ("painted" or "colored"). Phylogenetic analysis using mitochondrial and nuclear DNA has found that the peppered and painted maskrays are sister species. The two are estimated to have diverged c. 10 Ma, during the Miocene.

== Description ==
The peppered maskray has a thin, diamond-shaped pectoral fin disc roughly 1.2 times wider than long, with slightly concave leading margins and narrowly rounded outer corners. The snout forms an obtuse angle and has a pointed tip. The small, closely spaced eyes are followed by crescent-shaped spiracles. The nostrils are elongated and have a skirt-shaped curtain of skin between them; the posterior margin of the curtain is fringed and forms two lobes. The small mouth is surrounded by papillae and bears prominent furrows at the corners. There are two papillae on the floor of the mouth. The teeth number 33–38 rows in the upper jaw and 31–40 rows in the lower; the teeth are small and vary from pointed to blunt. The five pairs of gill slits are S-shaped. The pelvic fins are medium-sized and triangular with angular corners.

The whip-like tail measures 1.0–1.3 times as long as the disc and bears slender stinging spines on the upper surface; smaller rays usually have one sting, larger rays two. The tail is moderately broad and flattened at the base, becoming very thin behind the sting. Both upper and lower fin folds are present past the sting, with the upper fold shorter than the lower. There are up to 22 small, closely spaced thorns along the midline of the back behind the spiracles; otherwise, the skin is mostly smooth. This species is light yellow to brown above, with a darker reticulated pattern that may vary from faint to obvious, all overlaid by numerous black spots. Like other Neotrygon species, there is a dark marking across the eyes that resembles a mask. The tail has a pattern of saddles or bands behind the sting; the tip is white and the ventral fin fold darkens to almost black posteriorly. The underside is plain white. This species reaches 32 cm (13 in) across.

== Distribution and habitat ==
The range of the peppered maskray extends along the coast of northeastern Australia, from at least the Wessel Islands off Northern Territory to Hervey Bay in Queensland; the western boundary of its range is uncertain. It may also be found off New Guinea, though this is unconfirmed. This species is extremely common in some areas, such as the Gulf of Carpentaria. A benthic fish, it is usually found on the inner continental shelf in water less than 25 m (82 ft) deep, but may occur down to 100 m (330 ft). It favors habitats with sandy or other fine substrate.

== Biology and ecology ==
The peppered maskray prefers to pick prey from the surface of the substrate, as opposed to digging for them. Caridean shrimp are by far the most important food source. It also consumes polychaete worms and amphipods, and rarely penaeid prawns, molluscs, and small bony fishes. Compared to smaller rays, larger rays have a more varied diet that incorporates a greater proportion of polychaete worms.

Reproduction in the peppered maskray is viviparous; like other stingrays, the developing embryos are initially nourished by yolk and later by histotroph ("uterine milk") provided by the mother. Mature females have a single functional ovary and uterus, on the left side. Females give birth to litters of one to three pups, probably once per year. The newborns are 9–11 cm (3.5–4.3 in) across. Males and females reach sexual maturity at around 17 and 18 cm (6.7 and 7.1 in) across respectively. The maximum lifespan is at least 11 years for males and 18 years for females.

== Human interactions ==
The peppered maskray lacks economic value and is discarded by fisheries. It is often caught incidentally in bottom trawls, and due to its small size does not benefit from Turtle Exclusion Devices. In particular, this species accounts for approximately 4.5% of the total catch of the Northern Prawn Fishery (NPF) in the Gulf of Carpentaria. Over half of the rays caught by the NPF, including almost all the males, are fatally crushed within the trawl. Despite this mortality, the NPF is not believed to have negatively affected the local population because its operational area does not include the waters where this species is most abundant. The peppered maskray is also caught frequently in scallop trawls operated by the Queensland East Coast Trawl Fishery. Elsewhere in its range, fishing pressure is relatively light due to external factors such as fuel prices. The International Union for Conservation of Nature (IUCN) has listed this species under Least Concern, because it remains common and its range includes several Marine Protected Areas.
