= Neotrygon trigonoides =

Conservation status
- Least Concern (IUCN 3.1)

Scientific classification
- Kingdom: Animalia
- Phylum: Chordata
- Class: Chondrichthyes
- Subclass: Elasmobranchii
- Order: Myliobatiformes
- Family: Dasyatidae
- Genus: Neotrygon
- Species: N. trigonoides

Binomial name
- Neotrygon trigonoides Castelnau, 1873

Species of fish

Neotrygon trigonoides, the Caledonian maskray, is a type of whiptail stingray found exclusively in Australia and New Caledonia.

== Description ==
This species can be distinguished from several characteristics, such as light brown lilac body color, few vague white oscillated spots on the disc, larger number of smaller black spots dispersed irregularly, annulated posterior part of tail, black-orange bands on the rear of the tail, and light cream-colored underside of the body.

== Habitat & distribution ==
This species distribution range encompasses the coastal regions of Queensland and New South Wales in Australia; New Caledonia; and possibly Vanuatu. It inhabits the shallow habitats and ranges from the surface to a depth of around 50 m. This maskray is occasionally caught as bycatch and released in the waters of Australia.
