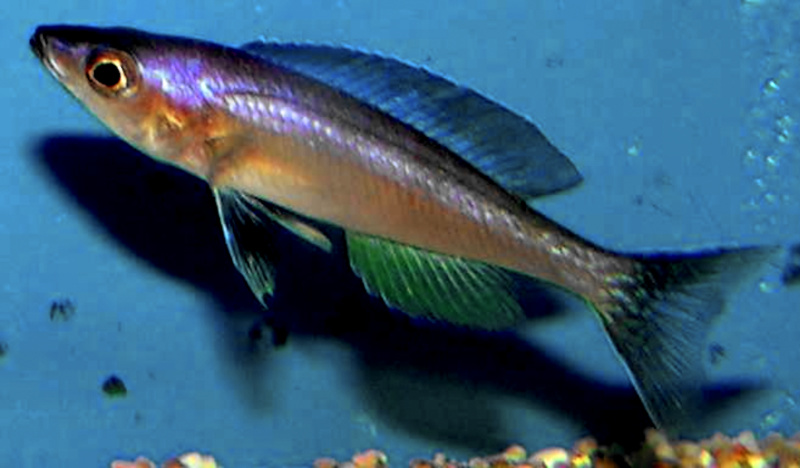
- Cyprichromis leptosoma

Scientific classification
- Kingdom: Animalia
- Phylum: Chordata
- Class: Actinopterygii
- Order: Cichliformes
- Family: Cichlidae
- Tribe: Cyprichromini
- Genus: Cyprichromis; Scheuermann, 1977

Type species
- Paratilapia leptosoma Boulenger, 1898

= Cyprichromis =

Genus of fishes

Cyprichromis is a genus of cichlids with five species. They are also known as the herring cichlids or sardine cichlids, since they form large schools in the open water of Lake Tanganyika. Of the known species, only C. microlepidotus has been recorded outside Lake Tanganyika (in eastern Tanzania).

== Species ==
The currently recognized species in this genus are:

- Cyprichromis coloratus T. Takahashi & M. Hori, 2006
- Cyprichromis leptosoma (Boulenger, 1898)
- Cyprichromis microlepidotus (Poll, 1956)
- Cyprichromis pavo Büscher, 1994
- Cyprichromis zonatus T. Takahashi, M. Hori & Nakaya, 2002
