= Electric blue kande =

Conservation status
- Least Concern (IUCN 3.1)

Scientific classification
- Kingdom: Animalia
- Phylum: Chordata
- Class: Actinopterygii
- Order: Cichliformes
- Family: Cichlidae
- Genus: Sciaenochromis
- Species: S. psammophilus

Binomial name
- Sciaenochromis psammophilus Konings, 1993

Species of fish

The electric blue kande (Sciaenochromis psammophilus) is a species of cichlid fish endemic to Lake Malawi where it prefers waters with a sandy substrate at depths of from 5 to 30 metres (16 to 98 ft). It can reach a length of 11.6 centimetres (4.6 in) SL.
