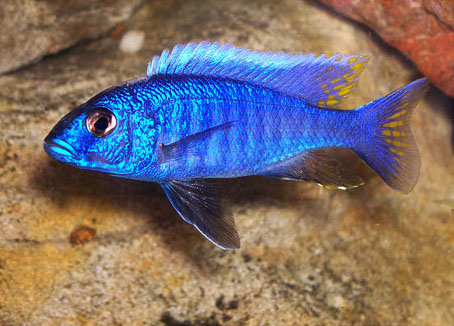
- Male S. fryeri

Scientific classification
- Kingdom: Animalia
- Phylum: Chordata
- Class: Actinopterygii
- Order: Cichliformes
- Family: Cichlidae
- Tribe: Haplochromini
- Genus: Sciaenochromis; Eccles & Trewavas, 1989

Type species
- Haplochromis ahli Trewavas, 1935

= Sciaenochromis =

Genus of fishes

Sciaenochromis is a genus of haplochromine cichlids endemic to Lake Malawi in East Africa. The species are popular in the aquarium hobby, most notably S. fryeri.

Only males possess the impressive, electric blue coloration, while females are dull grey, and generally similar to the females of Aulonocara species. All Sciaenochromis are piscivores (fish-eaters) and prey mainly upon the fry of mbuna and other haplochromine cichlids.

== Species ==
There are currently four recognized species in this genus:

Image	Scientific name	Common name	Distribution
	Sciaenochromis ahli (Trewavas, 1935)	Electric Blue Hap	Lake Malawi
	Sciaenochromis benthicola Konings, 1993		Lake Malawi
	Sciaenochromis fryeri Konings, 1993		Lake Malawi
	Sciaenochromis psammophilus Konings, 1993	Electric Blue Kande	Lake Malawi

== In the aquarium ==
Like all cichlids from Lake Malawi, they are best maintained in hard, alkaline water. Sciaenochromis are best kept in tanks with volumes greater than 210 L (55 gal). This is an aggressive fish, and the minimum tank size of 210 litres is only acceptable with a trio of 1 male and 2 females. When more than one male is kept, experts recommend a minimum tank size of 350 litres (77 imp gal; 92 US gal) being the minimum. Males can also display aggression towards similarly coloured fish of other species, for example Aulonocara or Placidochromis. its better to be careful having an 'Electric Blue Hap' in an aquarium.
