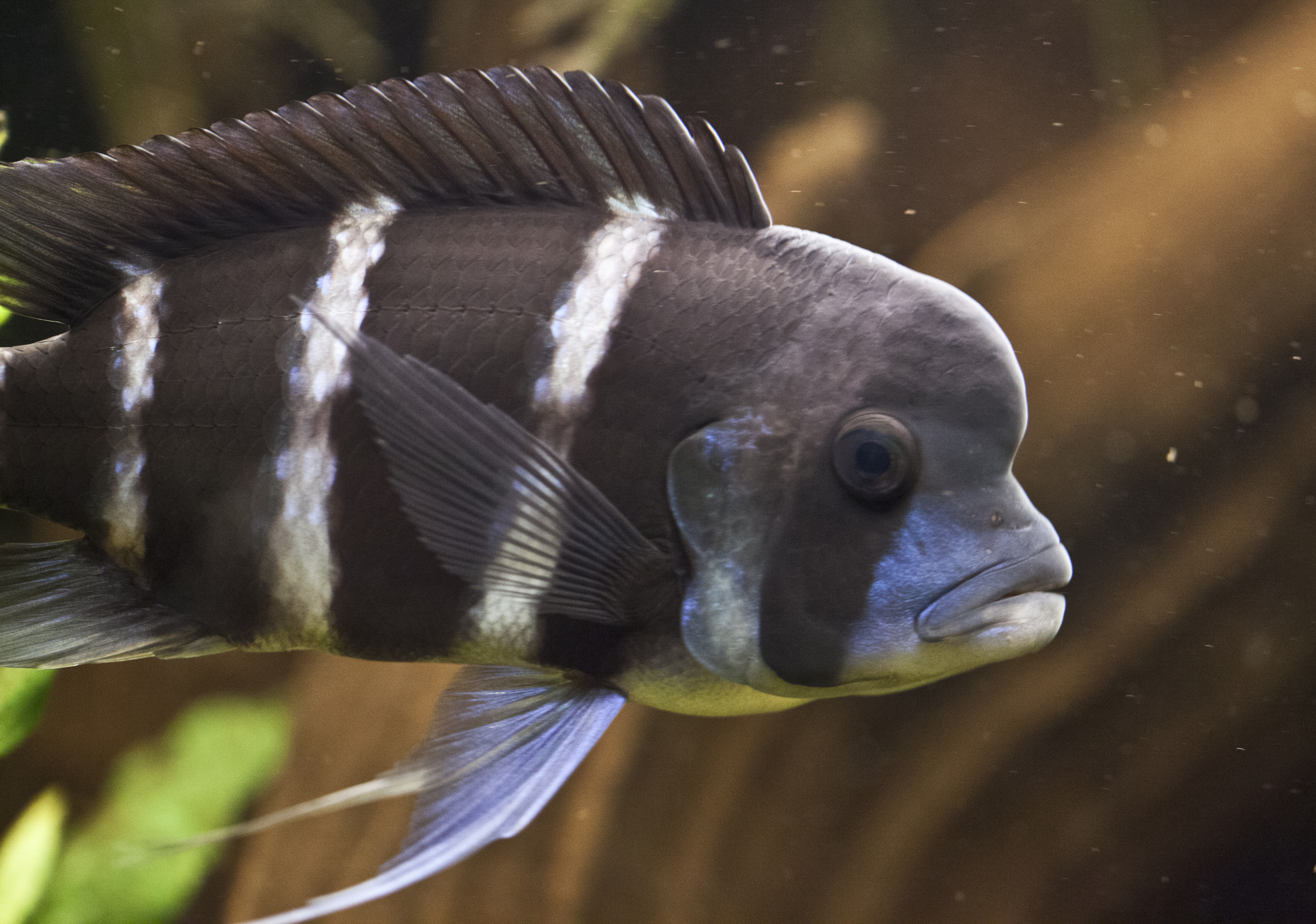

Conservation status
- Near Threatened (IUCN 3.1)

Scientific classification
- Kingdom: Animalia
- Phylum: Chordata
- Class: Actinopterygii
- Division: Teleostei
- Order: Cichliformes
- Family: Cichlidae
- Genus: Cyphotilapia
- Species: C. frontosa

Binomial name
- Cyphotilapia frontosa (Boulenger, 1906)

Synonyms
- Cyphotilapia frontosus (Boulenger, 1906); Paratilapia frontosa Boulenger, 1906; Pelmatochromis frontosus (Boulenger, 1906)

= Cyphotilapia frontosa =

Species of fish

Cyphotilapia frontosa, also called the front cichlid and frontosa cichlid, is an east African species of fish endemic to Lake Tanganyika. The genus name is a combination of the Ancient Greek "cypho-", meaning "curved", and tilapia, which means "fish" in a local dialect. The species name frontosa is a reference to its relatively large forehead.

== Description ==
C. frontosa can grow to 33 cm (1.1 ft) in length. Even captive specimens potentially grow to this size. It has distinct markings with five to seven black vertical bars adorning a white or blue body and head and trailing fins with a distinct blue hue. The species also develops a nuchal hump that is more pronounced in older specimens. C. frontosa is a sexually monomorphic species, although the hump is occasionally more pronounced in males. These fish can live over 25 years.

As is the case with many of the cichlid species found in Lake Tanganyika, isolation of distinct breeding colonies has resulted in several different colour variants evolving.

== Distribution and habitat ==
This species is endemic to Lake Tanganyika in East Africa and is widespread in the northern half of the lake, whereas the closely related C. gibberosa inhabits the southern half of the lake. The species generally resides at greater depths (30–50 m subsurface) than most other cichlids, and rises to shallow waters in the early morning to feed on shoaling fish such as Cyprichromis species. When kept in aquariums they must be kept between 25 and 30 degrees; they will also need many dark spots, such as caves.
