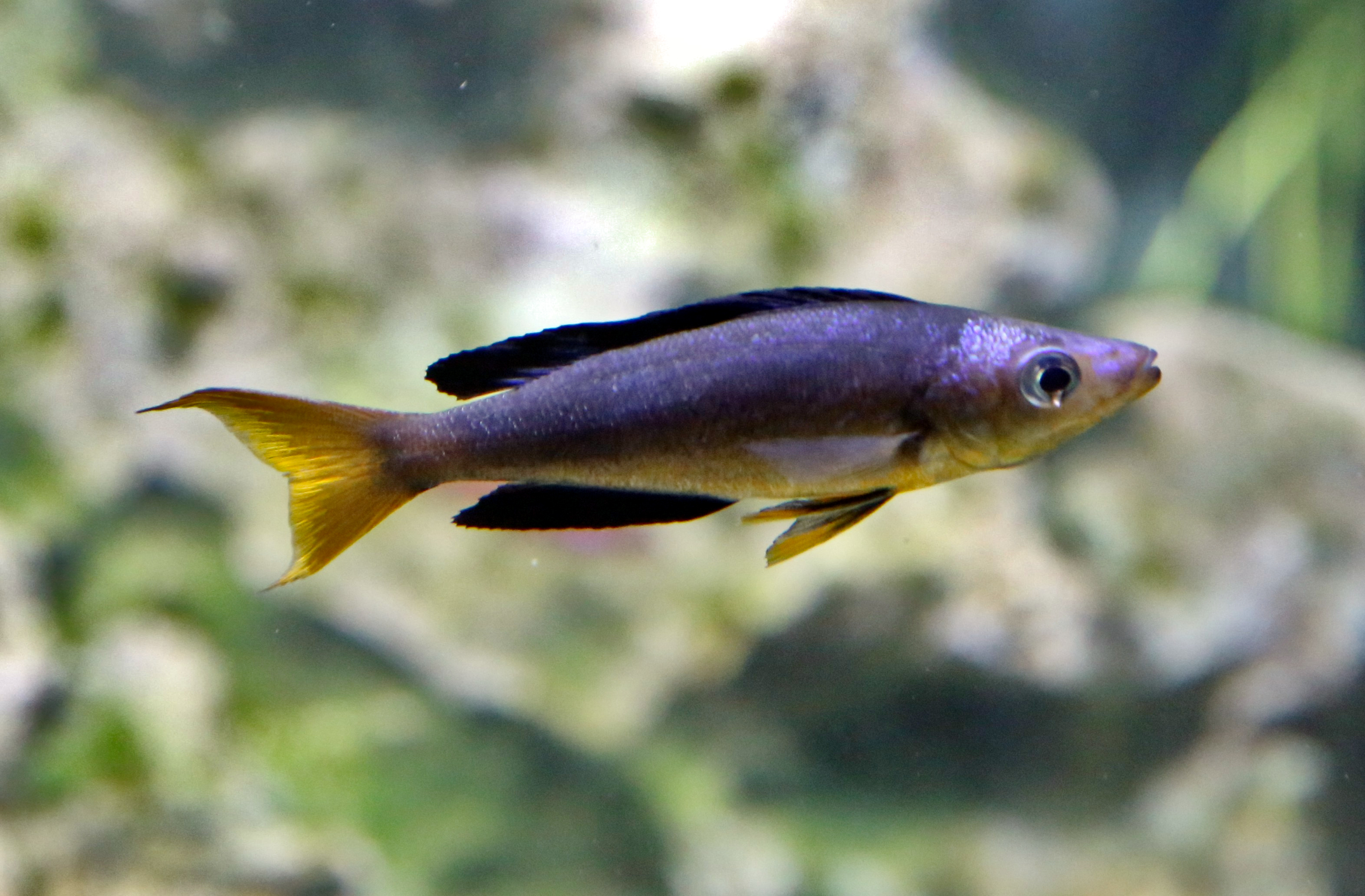

Conservation status
- Data Deficient (IUCN 3.1)

Scientific classification
- Kingdom: Animalia
- Phylum: Chordata
- Class: Actinopterygii
- Order: Cichliformes
- Family: Cichlidae
- Genus: Cyprichromis
- Species: C. microlepidotus

Binomial name
- Cyprichromis microlepidotus (Poll, 1956)

Synonyms
- Limnochromis microlepidotus Poll, 1956

= Cyprichromis microlepidotus =

Species of fish

Cyprichromis microlepidotus is an African species of fish in the family Cichlidae. It is endemic to Lake Tanganyika, where it is found in the northern part of the lake in Tanzania, Democratic Republic of the Congo, and Burundi.
