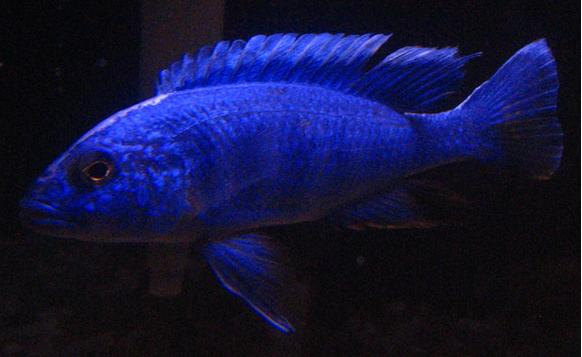

Conservation status
- Least Concern (IUCN 3.1)

Scientific classification
- Kingdom: Animalia
- Phylum: Chordata
- Class: Actinopterygii
- Order: Cichliformes
- Family: Cichlidae
- Genus: Sciaenochromis
- Species: S. ahli

Binomial name
- Sciaenochromis ahli (Trewavas, 1935)

Synonyms
- Haplochromis ahli Trewavas, 1935; Cyrtocara ahli (Trewavas, 1935)

= Electric blue hap =

Species of fish

The electric blue hap (Sciaenochromis ahli) is a species of cichlid fish endemic to Lake Malawi. It prefers to live in caves and crevices in rocky substrates. This species can reach a length of 20 centimetres (7.9 in) TL. It can occasionally be found in the aquarium trade.

== In the aquarium ==
Although it occasionally appears in the trade, the true electric blue hap (Sciaenochromis ahli) is rarely imported for aquaria; most fish sold under that common name belong to the related species Sciaenochromis fryeri. It should be kept in tanks of no less than 150 litres. A semi-aggressive fish, only one male is recommended per tank; however if large numbers are kept in a spacious enough environment, it is possible to keep more than one. Tank mates must be selected carefully. Large numbers prevent a single fish from being the target of aggression. The females are a drab grey in comparison and slightly smaller. They prefer rocky exhibits with coral sand.

== Breeding ==
As with many other cichlids, the electric blue hap is a mouth-brooder. The recommended ratio of males to females is 1:4. The female broods for 2–3 weeks. When the fry are released, they are around 1 cm.

== Etymology ==
The specific name of this fish honours the German zoologist Ernst Ahl (1898-1945) who originally described this species in 1926 as Haplochromis serranoides but this name had already been used by Charles Tate Regan in 1922, although Regan's name is a synonym of Haplochromis spekii.
