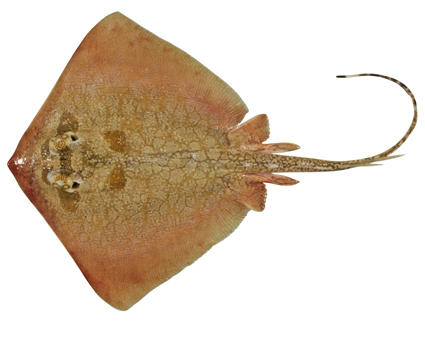

Conservation status
- Least Concern (IUCN 3.1)

Scientific classification
- Kingdom: Animalia
- Phylum: Chordata
- Class: Chondrichthyes
- Subclass: Elasmobranchii
- Order: Myliobatiformes
- Family: Dasyatidae
- Genus: Neotrygon
- Species: N. leylandi

Binomial name
- Neotrygon leylandi (Last, 1987)

Synonyms
- Dasyatis leylandi Last, 1987

= Painted maskray =

Species of cartilaginous fish

The painted maskray (Neotrygon leylandi) or brown-reticulate stingray, is a species of stingray in the family Dasyatidae. It is found in Australia, Indonesia and Papua New Guinea. Its natural habitats are shallow seas, subtidal aquatic beds, and coral reefs.
