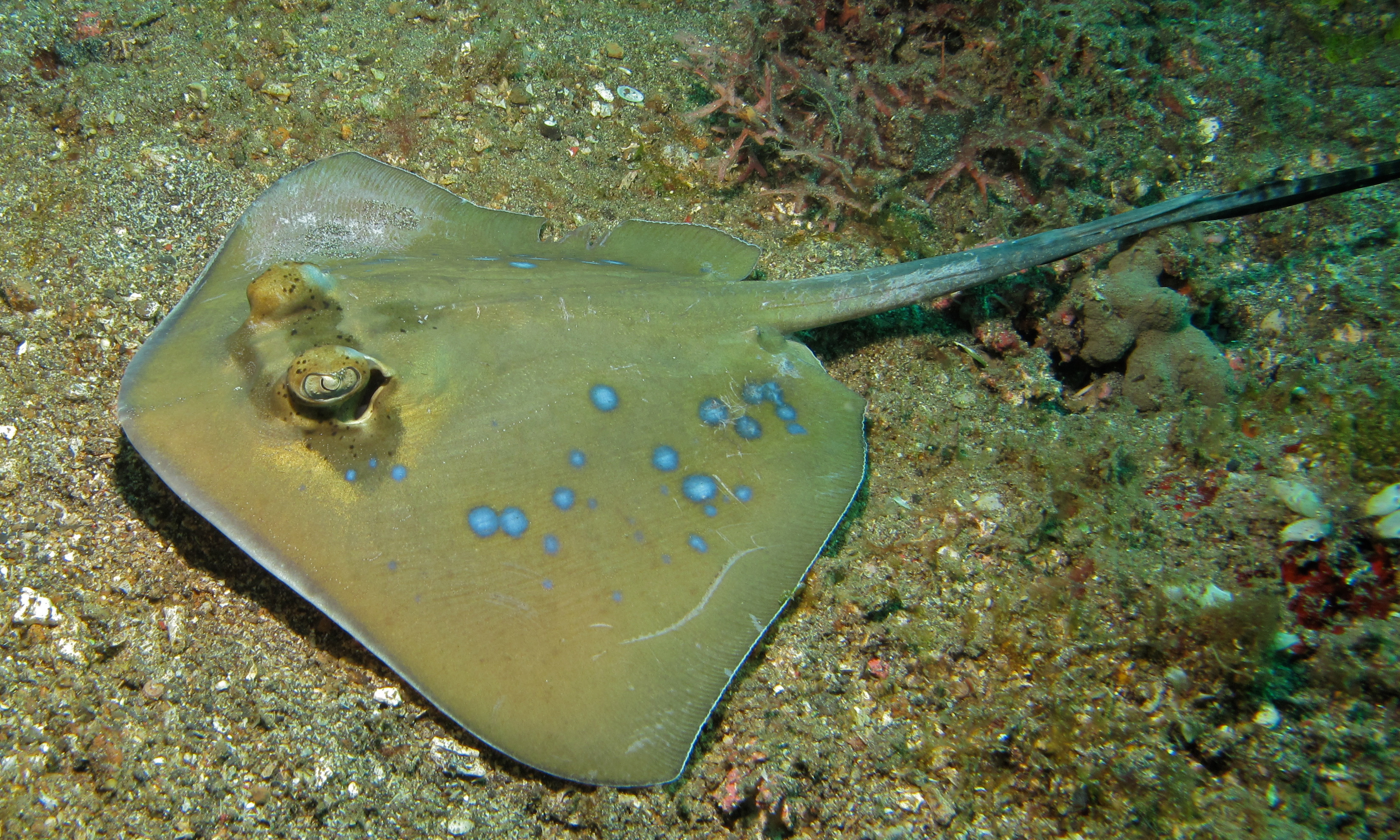

Conservation status
- Data Deficient (IUCN 3.1)

Scientific classification
- Kingdom: Animalia
- Phylum: Chordata
- Class: Chondrichthyes
- Subclass: Elasmobranchii
- Order: Myliobatiformes
- Family: Dasyatidae
- Genus: Neotrygon
- Species: N. kuhlii

Binomial name
- Neotrygon kuhlii (J. P. Müller & Henle, 1841)
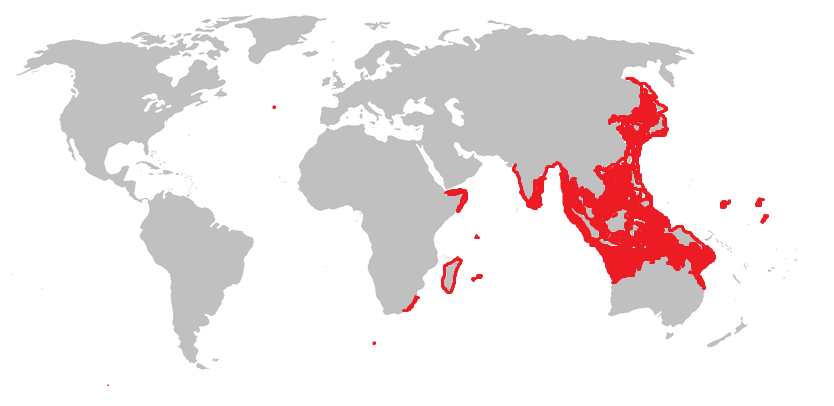
- Blue-spotted maskray range map

= Kuhl's maskray =

Species of cartilaginous fish

Kuhl's maskray (Neotrygon kuhlii), also known as the blue-spotted stingray, blue-spotted maskray, or Kuhl's stingray, is a species of stingray of the family Dasyatidae. Originally classified in the genus Dasyatis, it was transferred to the genus Neotrygon in 2008 after morphological and molecular analyses showed it to be distinct. The body is rhomboidal and colored green with blue spots. Maximum disk width is estimated 46.5 cm (18.3 in). It is popular in aquaria, but usually not distinguished from the blue-spotted ribbontail ray. The ribbontail has a rounded body, is a brighter green with brighter blue and more vivid spots, but Kuhl's maskray is larger. The stingray's lifespan is estimated at 13 years for females and 10 years for males. The blue-spotted stingray preys on many fish and small mollusks. It is also generally found from Indonesia to Japan, and most of Australia. Kuhl's maskray also is targeted by many parasites, such as tapeworms, flatworms, and flukes.

== Taxonomy ==
Kuhl's maskray was discovered by Heinrich Kuhl in Java, Indonesia. The population size of this species is greatly debatable due to the five different species of rays in Indonesia. Also, two different subgroups are known, the Java and Bali forms. The distinct difference between the two strains is their size, with the Bali being much larger than the Java. On the familial level, the family Dasyatidae is made up of 9 genera and 70 species. The species in Neotrygon are called maskrays, because of the color pattern around their eyes.

== Description and behavior ==
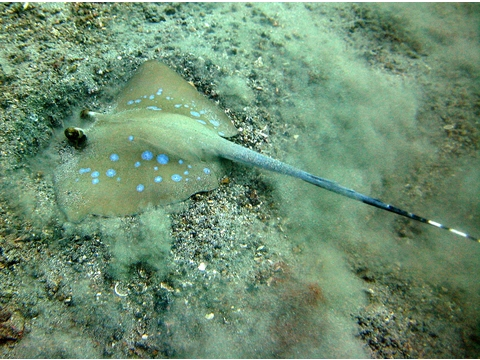
The full body of a blue-spotted stingray, showing the black-and-white-striped tail

Kuhl's maskrays have a flat, disc-like, rhomboid body up to 47 cm (19 in) in diameter and 70 cm (28 in) in total length. Their coloring is a dark green with blue spots with a light white underbelly, also known as countershading. Their snouts are very short and broadly angular along with an angular disc. The rays' bright coloration serves as a warning for their venomous spines. The rays have a very long tail accommodating two venomous spines on its base. Their tails are about twice as long as their bodies, and the barbs or spines are two different sizes, one being very large and the other medium in size. Kuhl's maskrays have bright yellow eyes that are positioned to allow them a wide angle of view. Since their gills are located ventrally, the spiracles allow water to reach the gills while resting or feeding on the benthos. The spiracles are located directly behind the eyes. The mouth is located on the ventral side of the body, which promotes the unique foraging technique of stingrays. Rays are normally solitary individuals, but can occur in groups. One unique characteristic of Kuhl's maskrays is that they bury themselves in the sand only to hide from predators, unlike most stingrays, which bury themselves regularly to hunt.

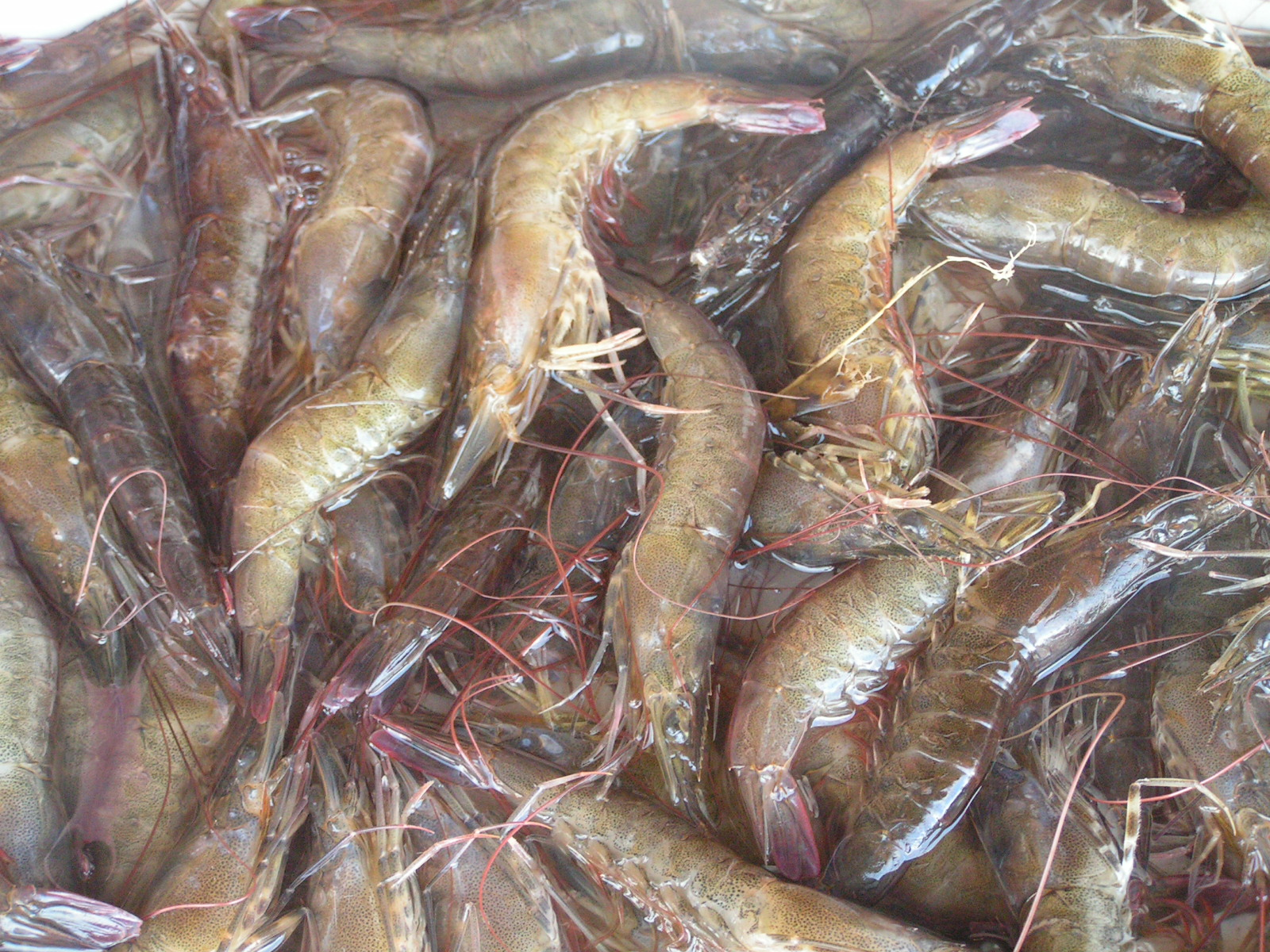
Shrimp, one of the blue-spotted stingray's food sources

=== Diet ===
Kuhl's maskray feeds on shrimp, small bony fish, mollusks, crabs, and worms. Because this ray is a shallow-bottom feeder, it has a small variety of marine life on which to prey. It overpowers its prey by pinning it to the bottom of the seafloor with its fins. This ray has numerous tiny teeth, with the lower jaw being slightly convex. Like most stingrays, it has plate-like teeth to crush prey.

=== Reproduction ===
Kuhl's maskray is ovoviviparous. The embryos are retained in eggs within the mother's body until they are ready to hatch. The embryos receive nourishment from the mothers' uterine fluid. Mothers give birth to up to seven pups per litter; these pups range from 6 to 13 in (150 to 330 mm) long at birth. The blue-spotted stingray passes its offspring 32 sets of chromosomes. The female also has an annual reproductive cycle. The mating season is in October and November, and the ovulating season is in the Australian summer (December 1- February 28/29), which coincides with the embryonic development.

== Habitat ==
The blue-spotted stingray is commonly found in waters of depths less than 90 m (295 ft), being commonly found in sand and mudflats, but is also encountered near rocky coral reefs and sea grass beds. This stingray is found in a tropical climate at 29°N to 31°S, and 20°E to 171°W. At high tide, the blue-spotted stingray moves into the shallow lagoons and reef flats. It is found in northern Australia, Kenya, Madagascar, Mauritius, Somalia, the east coast of South Africa, and India, and in almost the entire continental waters of Asia, including the Sea of Japan, Yellow Sea, East China Sea, Philippine Sea, Sulu Sea, Java Sea, Banda Sea, Celebes Sea, Andaman Sea, the Bay of Bengal, and the Arabian Sea.

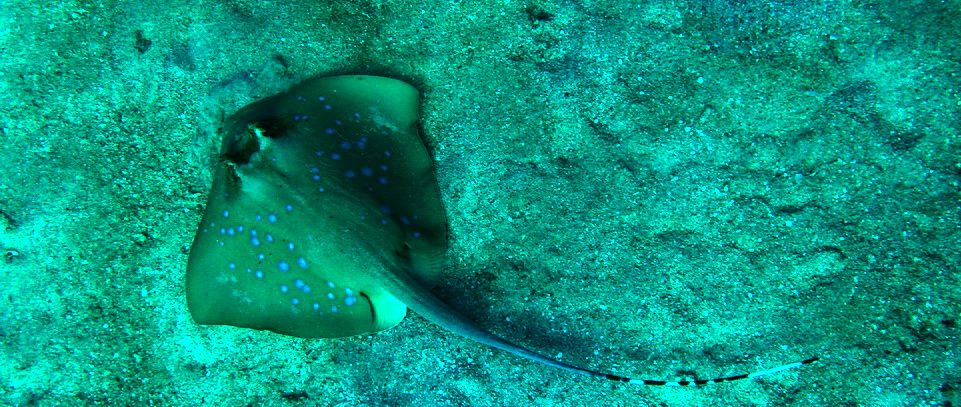
The body of a Kuhl's maskray is more angular, which distinguishes it from the blue-spotted ribbontail ray.

== Threats and protected areas ==
Queensland, Australia, has many areas for high protection of Kuhl's maskrays, three being the Shoalwater, Corio Bay's Area Ramsar Site, and the Great Barrier Reef Marine Park. A major threat to this stingray is the destruction of coral reefs mainly in the north-western Pacific. The rays dwell in these reefs and the destruction and pollution from fertilizers and pesticides hurt them. The ray is commonly caught in the Java Sea by fishermen trawling and by Danish seine boats in large quantities. The blue-spotted stingray is the second-most significant species of the shark, ray, and skate families to be fished, contributing to about 700 kg (1,500 lb) per boat in 2006–2007.

== Predators ==
Larger elasmobranchs, such as hammerhead sharks, prey on Kuhl's maskrays. The rays' coloration is a warning for the highly venomous barbs, thus few animals attempt to overpower them. The hammerhead shark uses its head to pin down this stingray, while it is in shock and much weaker.

== Human interaction ==
Due to the unique characteristics of this ray, it is commonly found in pet trade, but many people ignore the fact that the fully mature size of the ray exceeds the capacity of many household aquaria. Kuhl's maskray is generally fished for its meat, being either smoked and salted or dried for local markets, but inexpensive due to its small size. It is caught in mass in bottom trawl, trammel, and fish traps. Kuhl's maskray is very venomous and it has a barb about 12 in (300 mm) long. The venom contains serotonin, 5' nucleotidase, and phosphodiesterase.

The skin of the blue-spotted stingray is often used for drums, such as on the Arab and Turkish darbuka goblet drum and riq tambourine.

== Parasites ==
Many parasites can inhabit the blue-spotted stingray:

| Common Class | Group | Parasite |
|---|---|---|
| Tapeworms | Cestodes, Cephalobothriidae | Cephalobothrium longisegmentum and Tylocephalum kuhli |
| Tapeworms | Cestodes, Mixodigmatidae | Trygonicola macroporus |
| Tapeworms | Cestodes, Onchobothriidae | Acanthobothrium bengalens, Acanthobothrium confusum, Acanthobothrium herdmani, and Acanthobothrium pingtanensis |
| Tapeworms | Cestodes, Phyllobothriidae | Echeneibothrium trygonis, Phyllobothrium ptychocephalum, Rhinebothrium shipleyi, Scalithrium shipleyi, and Scalithrium trygonis |
| Flatworms | Monogeneans, Monocotylidae | Dendromonocotyle kuhlii, Heterocotyle chinensis, Monocotyle kuhlii, and Monocotyle tritestis |
| Flukes | Trematodes, Monocotylidae | Prosorhynchus clavatum |
| Flukes | Trematodes, Didymozoidae | Didymozoid larva |

External videos
- Blue spotted stingray swimming YouTube
- Hand feeding a blue spotted stingrayYouTube
- How Whales Eat Sharks National Geographic

== Applications ==
Two short peptides identified from the hydrolyzed proteins of this species showed protective effects against the oxidation of lipids, DNA and proteins. The potential application of the peptides as functional food ingredients or nutraceuticals has been proposed.
