= List of the Cenozoic life of Georgia (U.S. state) =

This list of the Cenozoic life of Georgia contains the various prehistoric life-forms whose fossilized remains have been reported from within the US state of Georgia and are between 66 million and 10,000 years of age.

== A ==
- †Abdounia
  - †Abdounia enniskilleni
- Abra
  - †Abra aequalis
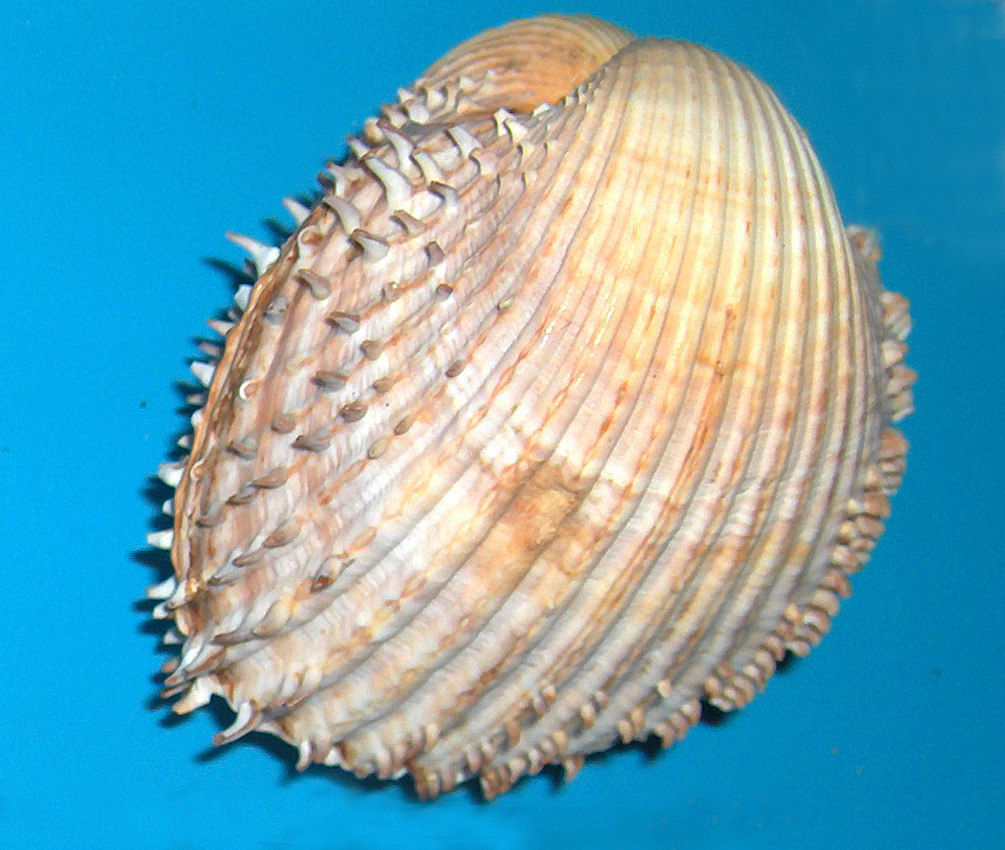
- Shell of an Acanthocardia cockle
  Acanthocardia
  - †Acanthocardia glebosum
  - †Acanthocardia tuomeyi
- Acar
  - †Acar domingensis – tentative report
- Acteocina
  - †Acteocina canaliculata
- †Actinacis
  - †Actinacis alabamensis
- Aequipecten
  - †Aequipecten clinchfieldensis
  - †Aequipecten spillmani
  - †Aequipecten suwaneensis
- Aetobatus
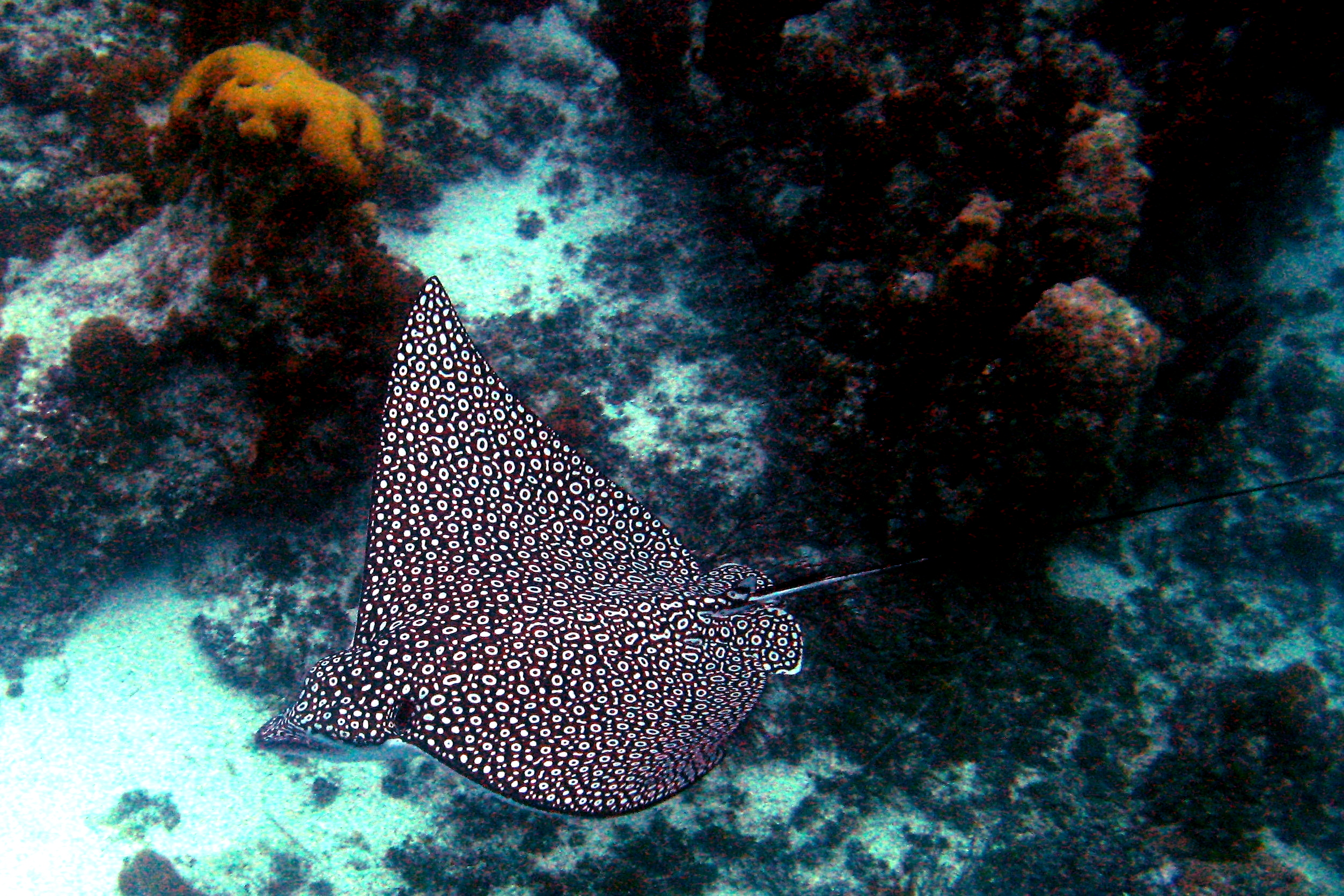
  - A living Aetobatus narinari, or spotted eagle ray
    Aetobatus narinari
- Agassizia
  - †Agassizia conradi
- Agkistrodon
  - †Agkistrodon piscivorus
- †Agomphus
  - †Agomphus oxysternum – type locality for species
- Aix
  - †Aix sponsa
- Alligator
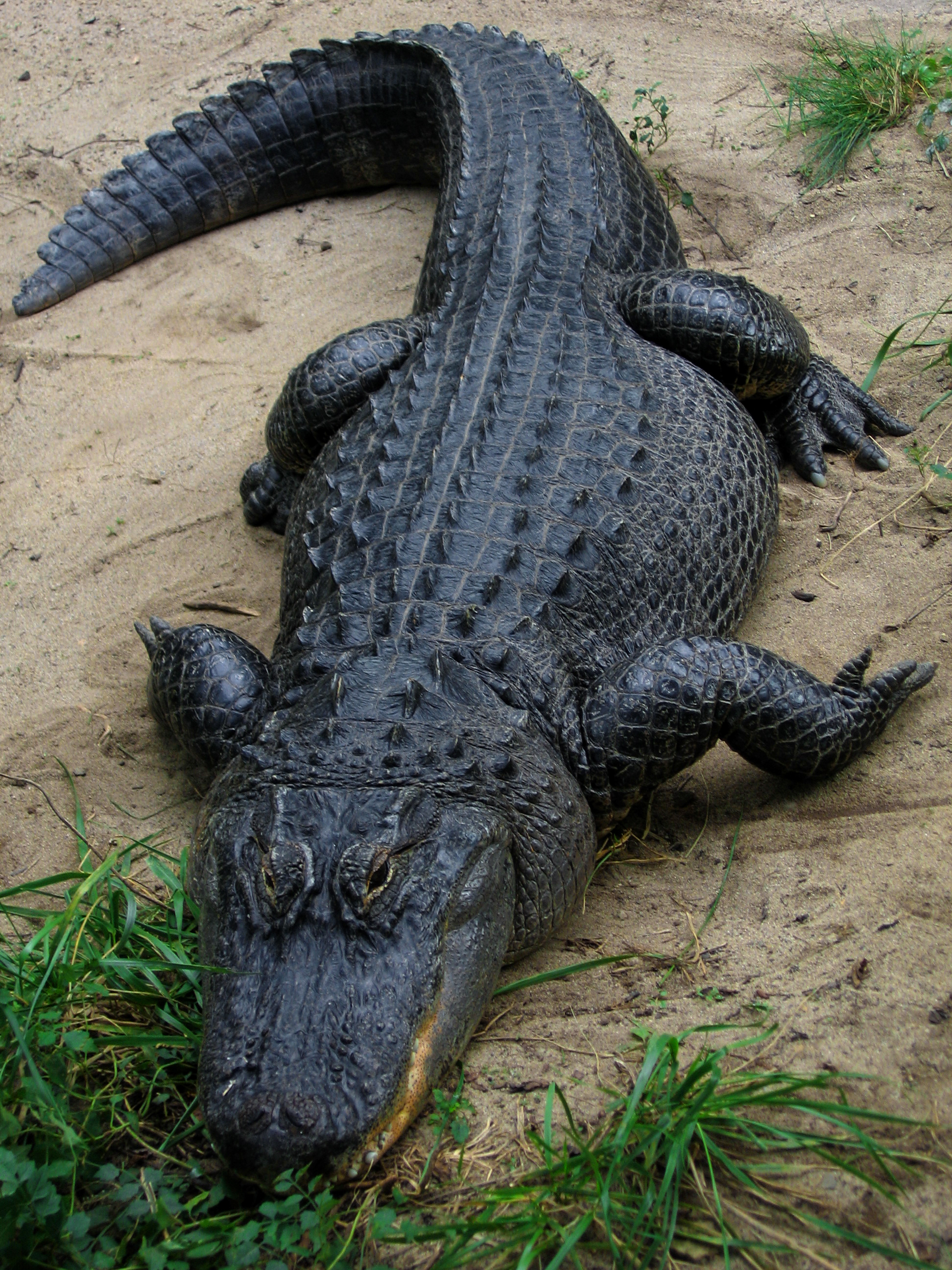
  - A living Alligator mississippiensis, or American alligator
    †Alligator mississippiensis
- Alosa – or unidentified comparable form
- Alveopora
- Amauropsis
  - †Amauropsis ocalana
- †Ambystoma
  - †Ambystoma maculatum – or unidentified comparable form
  - †Ambystoma tigrinum
- Amnicola
  - †Amnicola expansilabris
  - †Amnicola georgiensis
  - †Amnicola saltillensis
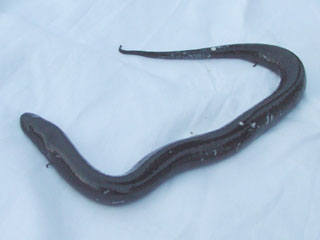
- A living Amphiuma
  Amphiuma
- †Ampullina
  - †Ampullina flintensis – or unidentified comparable form
  - †Ampullina solida
  - †Ampullina streptostoma
- †Ampullinopsis
  - †Ampullinopsis amphora
- Amusium
  - †Amusium ocalanum
- Anadara
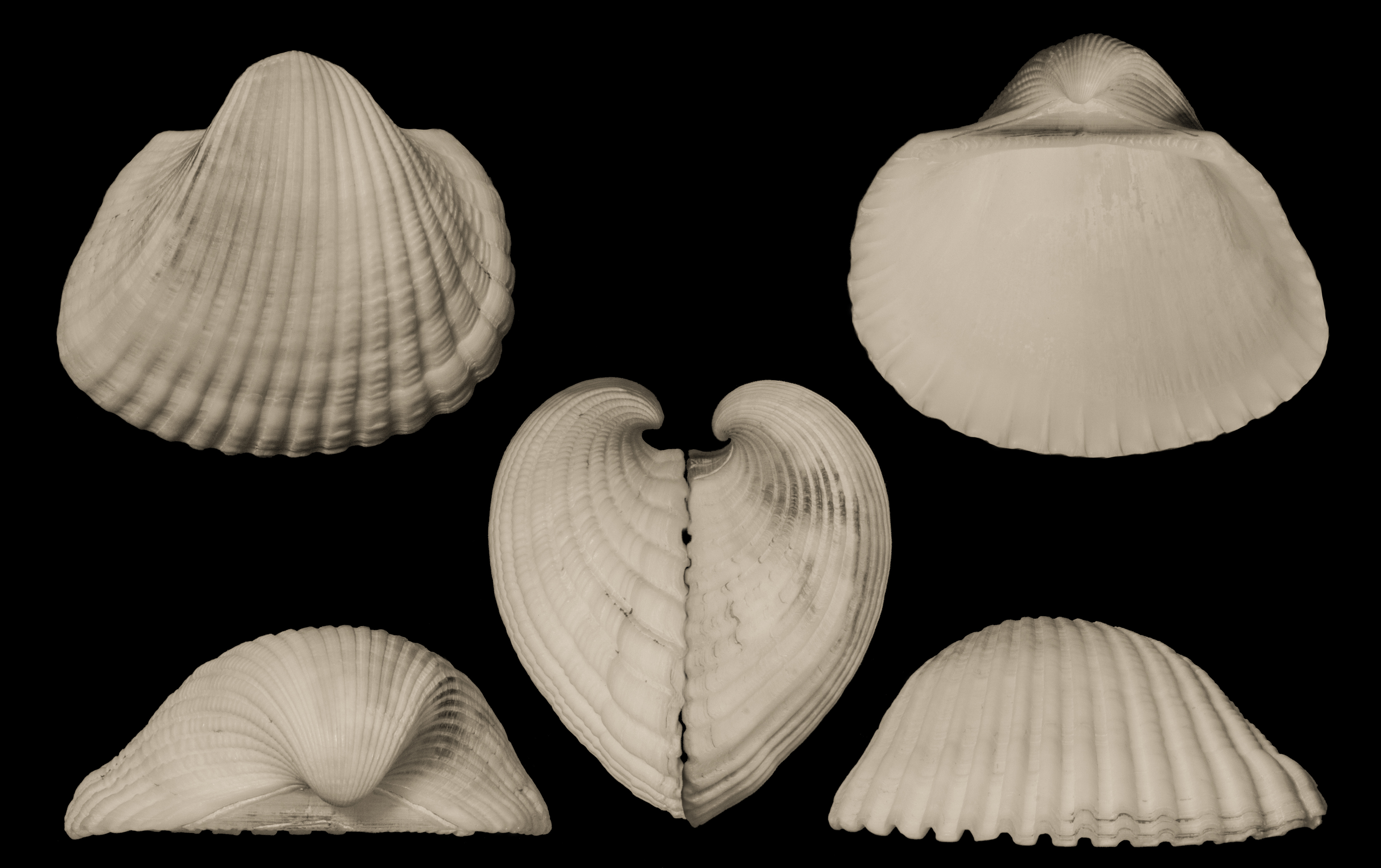
  - Shell in multiple views of an Anadara brasiliana, or incongruous ark clam
    †Anadara brasiliana
  - †Anadara ovalis
  - †Anadara santarosana
  - †Anadara transversa
- Anas
  - †Anas acuta
  - †Anas americana
  - †Anas crecca
  - †Anas discors
  - †Anas platyrhynchos – or unidentified comparable form
  - †Anas rubripes
  - †Anas strepera
- Anolis
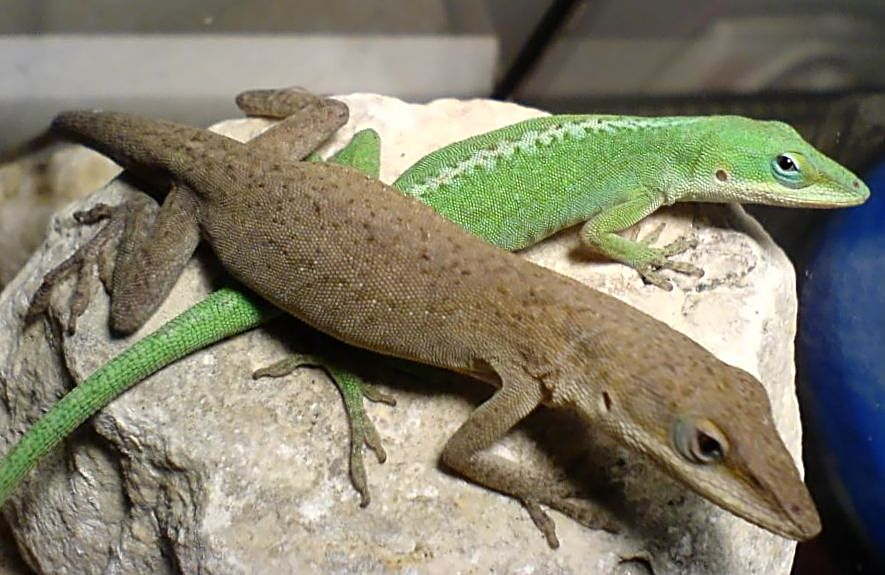
  - Living male (on top) and female (bottom, with white stripe down her back) Anolis carolinensis, or Carolina anoles
    †Anolis carolinensis
- Anomia
  - †Anomia lisbonensis
  - †Anomia simplex
  - †Anomia suwaneensis
- †Anoplonassa – type locality for genus
  - †Anoplonassa forcipata – type locality for species
- †Antiguastrea
  - †Antiguastrea cellulosa
- Apalone
  - †Apalone ferox
- †Aporolepas
  - †Aporolepas howei
- †Araloselachus
  - †Araloselachus cuspidata
- Arca
  - †Arca subrotracta
- Archaeolithothamnium
- Architectonica
  - †Architectonica nobilis
- †Archosargus
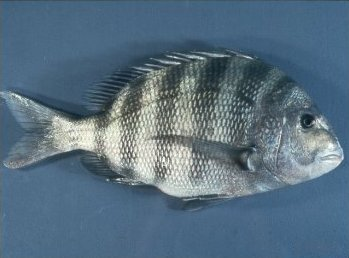
  - A living Archosargus probatocephalus, or sheepshead
    †Archosargus probatocephalus
- Arcoperna
  - †Arcoperna inflata
- Arius
  - †Arius felis
- Asio
- Astarte – report made of unidentified related form or using admittedly obsolete nomenclature
  - †Astarte subpontis
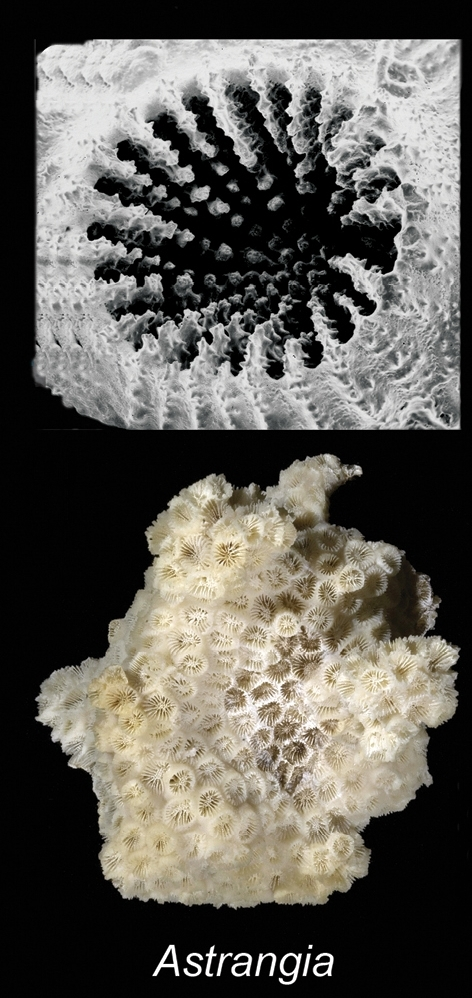
- Electron micrograph and gross view of an Astrangia poculata stony coral
  Astrangia
  - †Astrangia danae
- Astreopora
  - †Astreopora antiguensis
- †Astrocoenia
  - †Astrocoenia decaturensis – type locality for species
- Athleta – or unidentified comparable form
- Atrina
  - †Atrina jacksoniana
- Aythya
  - †Aythya collaris

== B ==
- Bairdiella
  - †Bairdiella chrysoura – or unidentified comparable form
- Balistes
- Barbatia
  - †Barbatia cuculloides
- Bartramia
  - †Bartramia longicauda
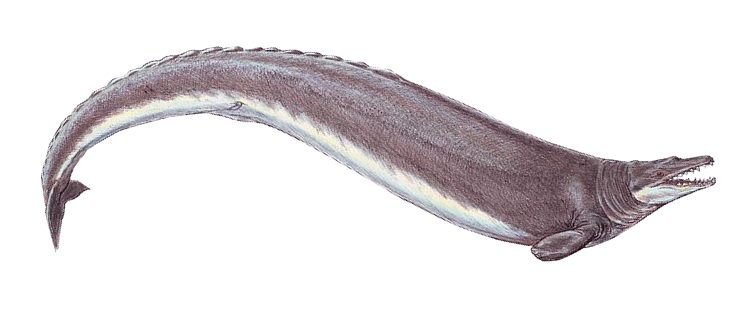
- Life restoration of the Eocene whale Basilosaurus
  †Basilosaurus
  - †Basilosaurus cetoides
- Bathytormus
  - †Bathytormus protextus
- Bison
  - †Bison bison – tentative report
- Bittium
  - †Bittium silicium
- Blarina
  - †Blarina brevicauda
  - †Blarina carolinensis
- Bonasa
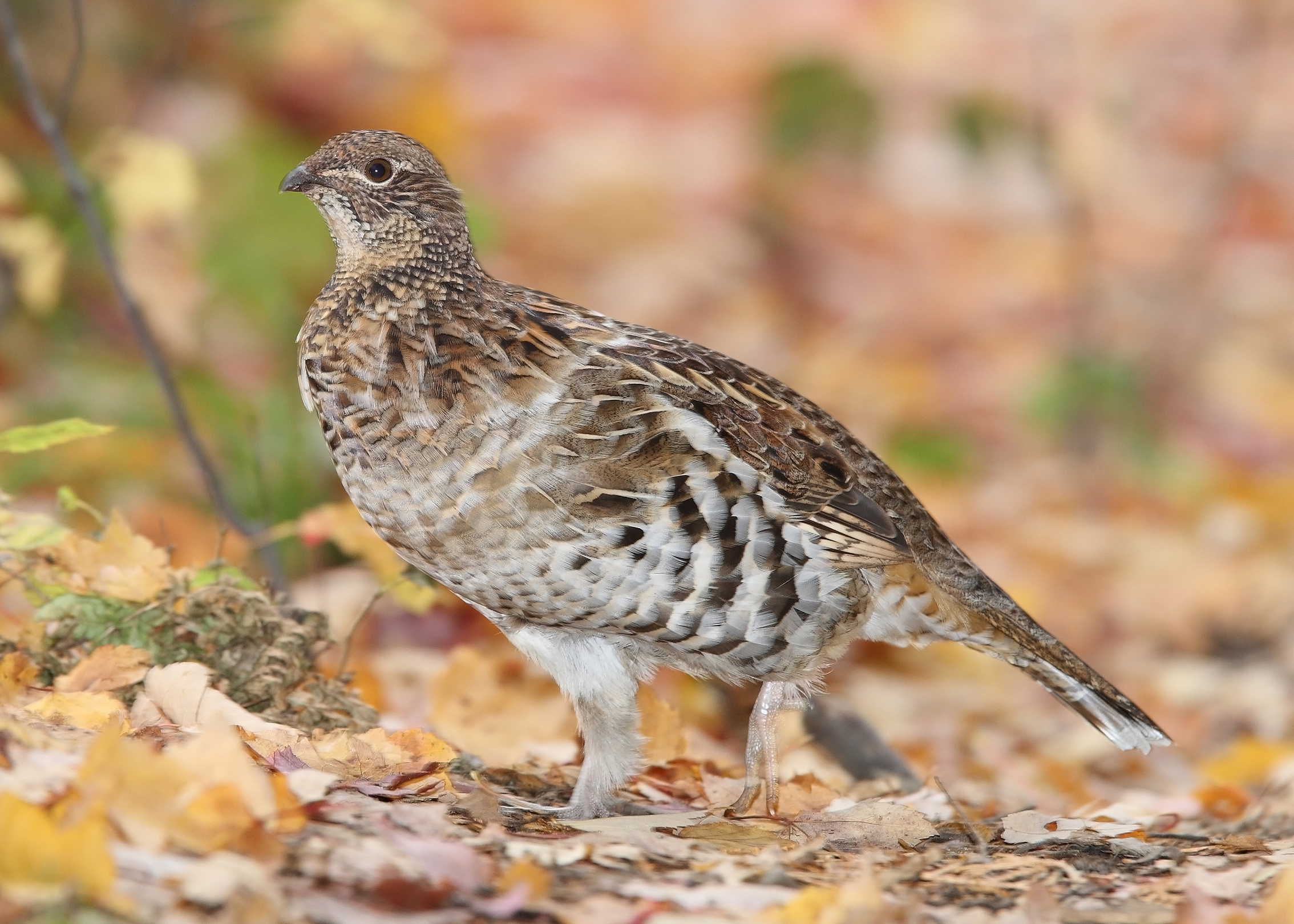
  - A living Bonasa umbellus, or ruffed grouse
    †Bonasa umbellus
- Bornia
  - †Bornia isosceles
- †Braarudosphaera
  - †Braarudosphaera bigelowii
- Brissus
- Bucephala
  - †Bucephala albeola
- Bufo
  - †Bufo americanus
- †Burnhamia
  - †Burnhamia daviesi
- Bursa
  - †Bursa vitrix
- Busycon
  - †Busycon carica
  - †Busycon foerstei – type locality for species
  - †Busycon proterum – type locality for species

== C ==
- †Calippus
- Callista
  - †Callista perovata
- †Calorhadia
  - †Calorhadia pharcida
- Calyptraea
  - †Calyptraea centralis
- Campanile
  - †Campanile claytonense
- Canachites
  - †Canachites canadensis
- Canis
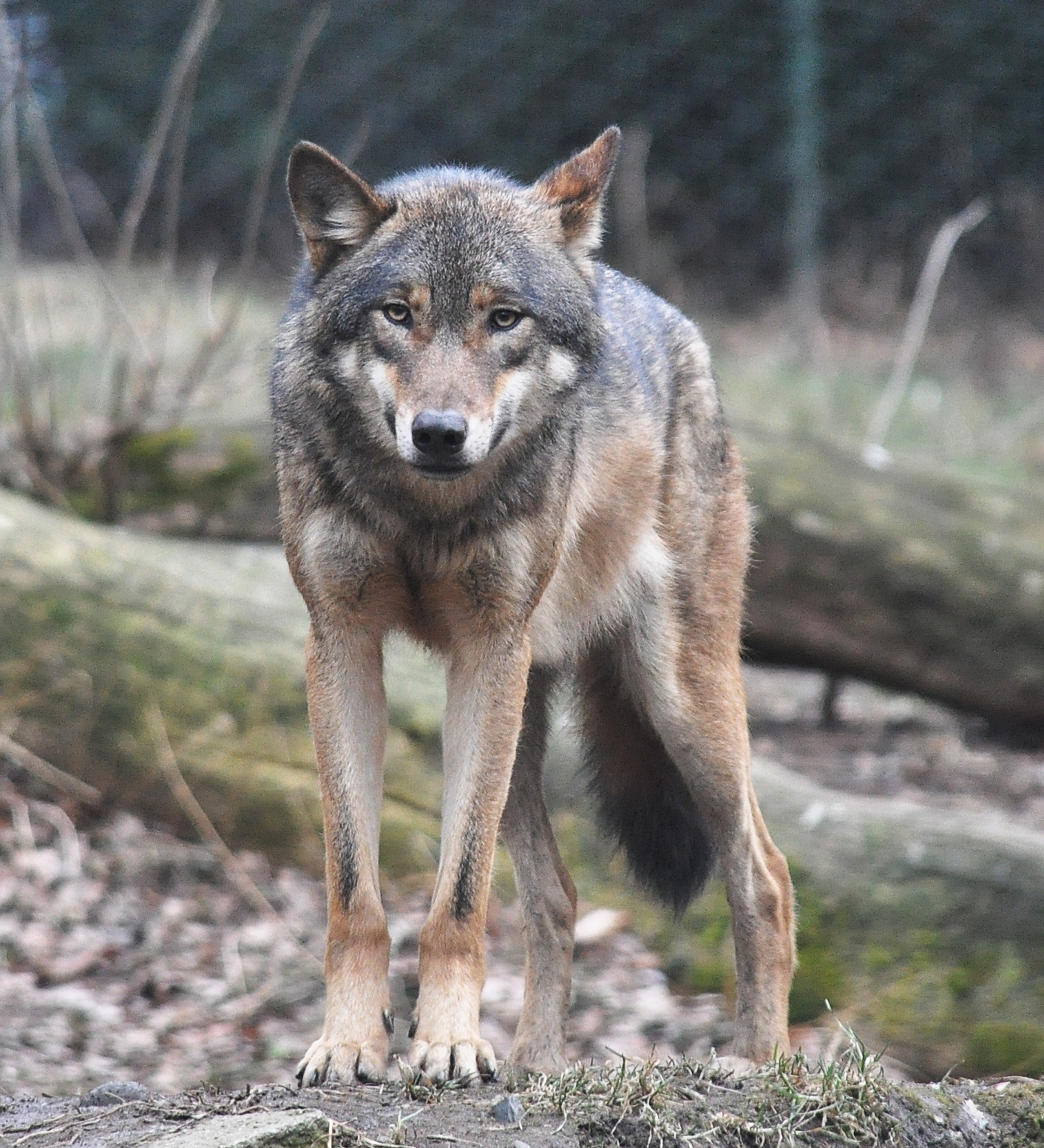
  - A living Canis lupus, or gray wolf
    †Canis lupus – or unidentified comparable form
- Carcharhinus
  - †Carcharhinus gibbesi
  - †Carcharhinus leucas
  - †Carcharhinus macloti – or unidentified comparable form
  - †Carcharhinus obscurus
- Carcharias
  - †Carcharias accutissima
  - †Carcharias hopei
  - †Carcharias taurus
- †Carcharis
  - †Carcharis koerti
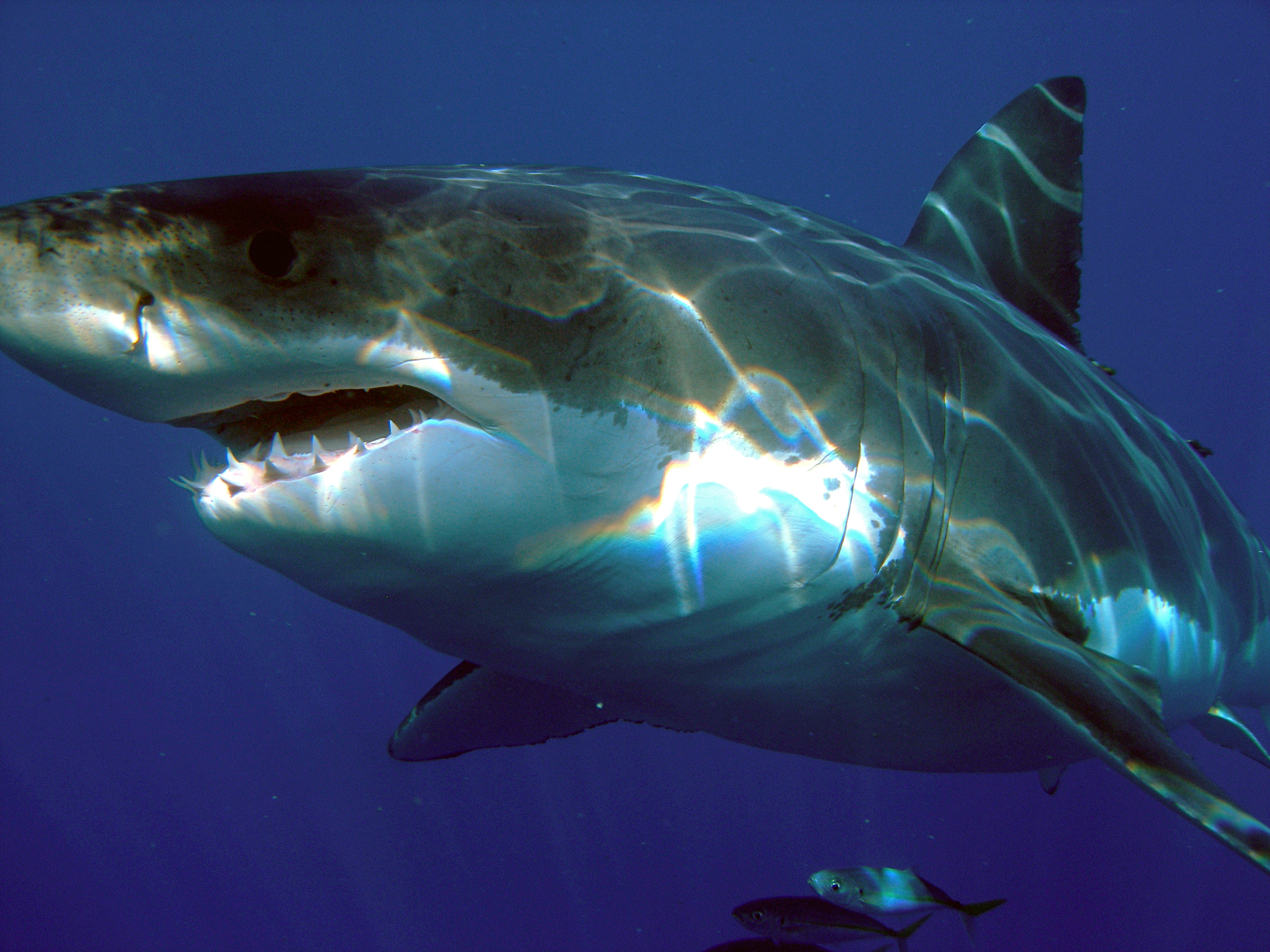
- A living Carcharodon shark
  Carcharodon
  - †Carcharodon auriculatus
- Cardita
  - †Cardita shepardi
- Carditamera
  - †Carditamera apotegea
- Carphophis
  - †Carphophis amoenus
- Carya
- Cassis
  - †Cassis globosa
  - †Cassis inornatus
  - †Cassis sulcifera
- Castor
  - †Castor canadensis
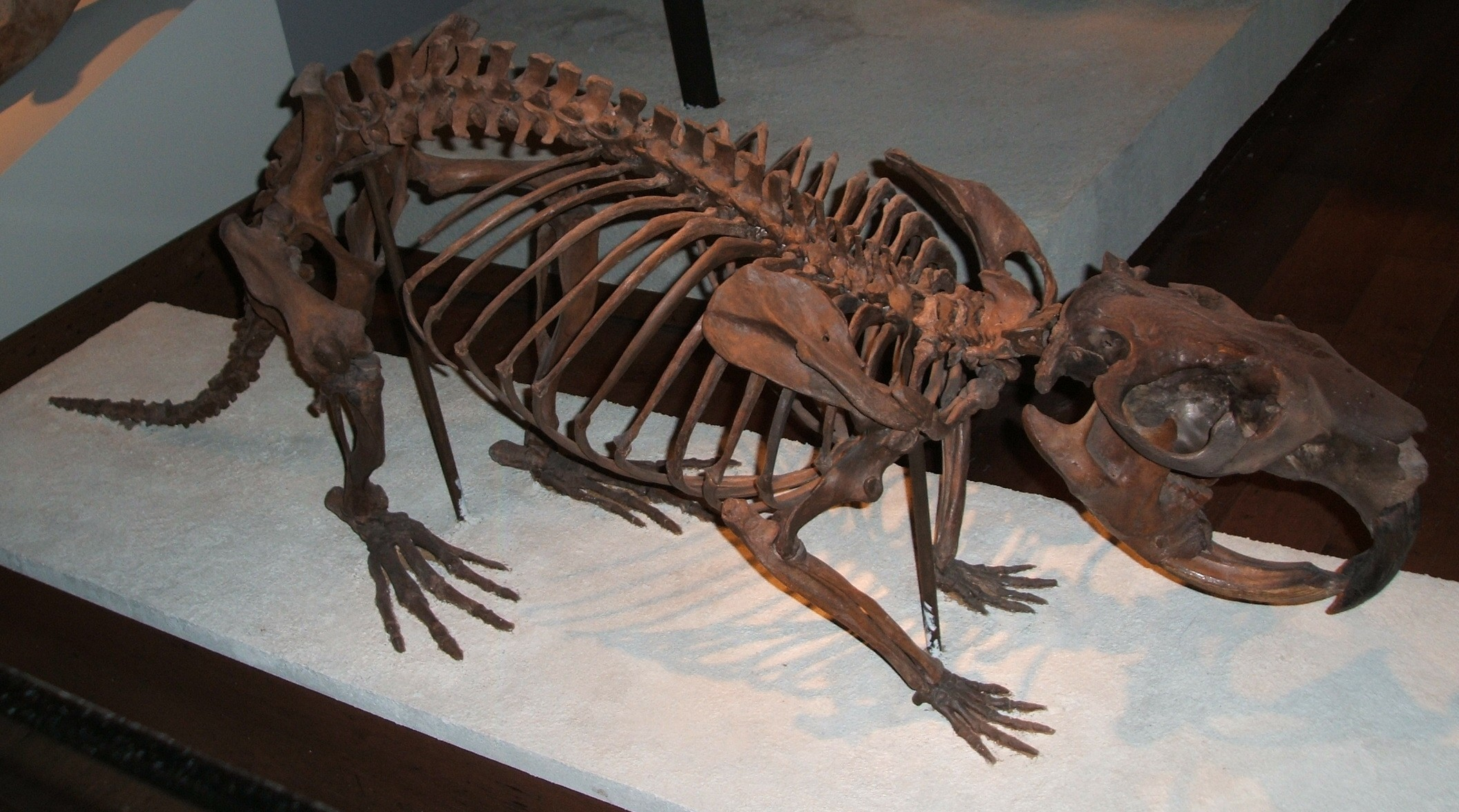
- Mounted fossilized skeleton of the Pliocene-Pleistocene giant beaver Castoroides
  †Castoroides
  - †Castoroides ohioensis
- Catoptrophorus – or unidentified comparable form
  - †Catoptrophorus semipalmatus
- Cerithiopsis
  - †Cerithiopsis diagona
- Cerithium
  - †Cerithium cookei
  - †Cerithium corallicolum
  - †Cerithium eutextile
  - †Cerithium gainesense
  - †Cerithium georgianum
  - †Cerithium halense
  - †Cerithium hernandoensis – or unidentified comparable form
  - †Cerithium insulatum
  - †Cerithium mascotianum
  - †Cerithium platynema
  - †Cerithium praecursor – tentative report
  - †Cerithium silicifluvium
  - †Cerithium vaughani
- Cervus
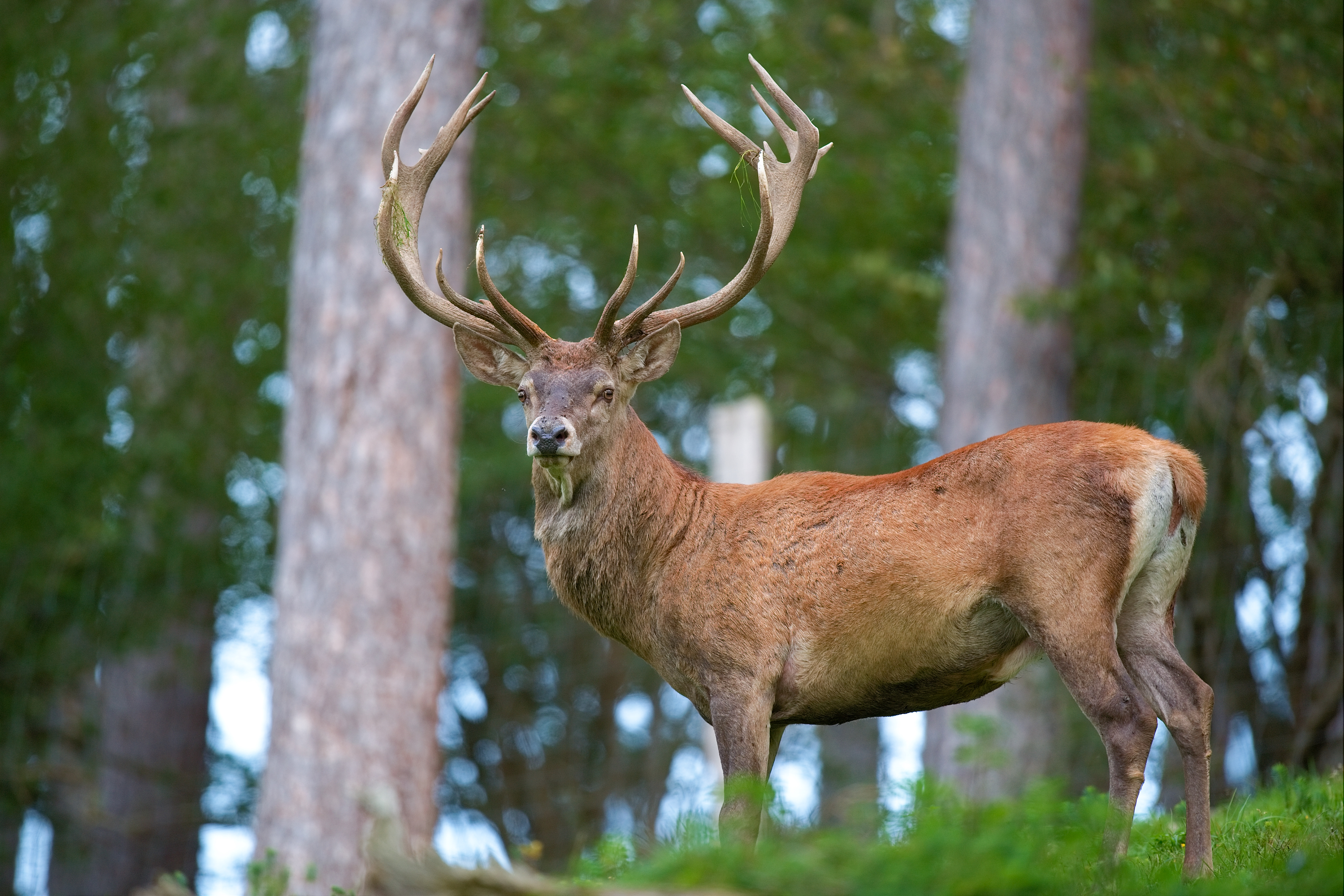
  - A living Cervus elaphus, or red deer
    †Cervus elaphus
- †Cestumcerithium
  - †Cestumcerithium vaginatum
- Chama
  - †Chama gainesensis
- Cheiloporina
  - †Cheiloporina anderseni – type locality for species
- Chelydra
  - †Chelydra serpentina
- †Chiasmolithus
  - †Chiasmolithus modestus
  - †Chiasmolithus solitus
  - †Chiasmolithus titus
- Chionopsis
  - †Chionopsis bainbridgensis
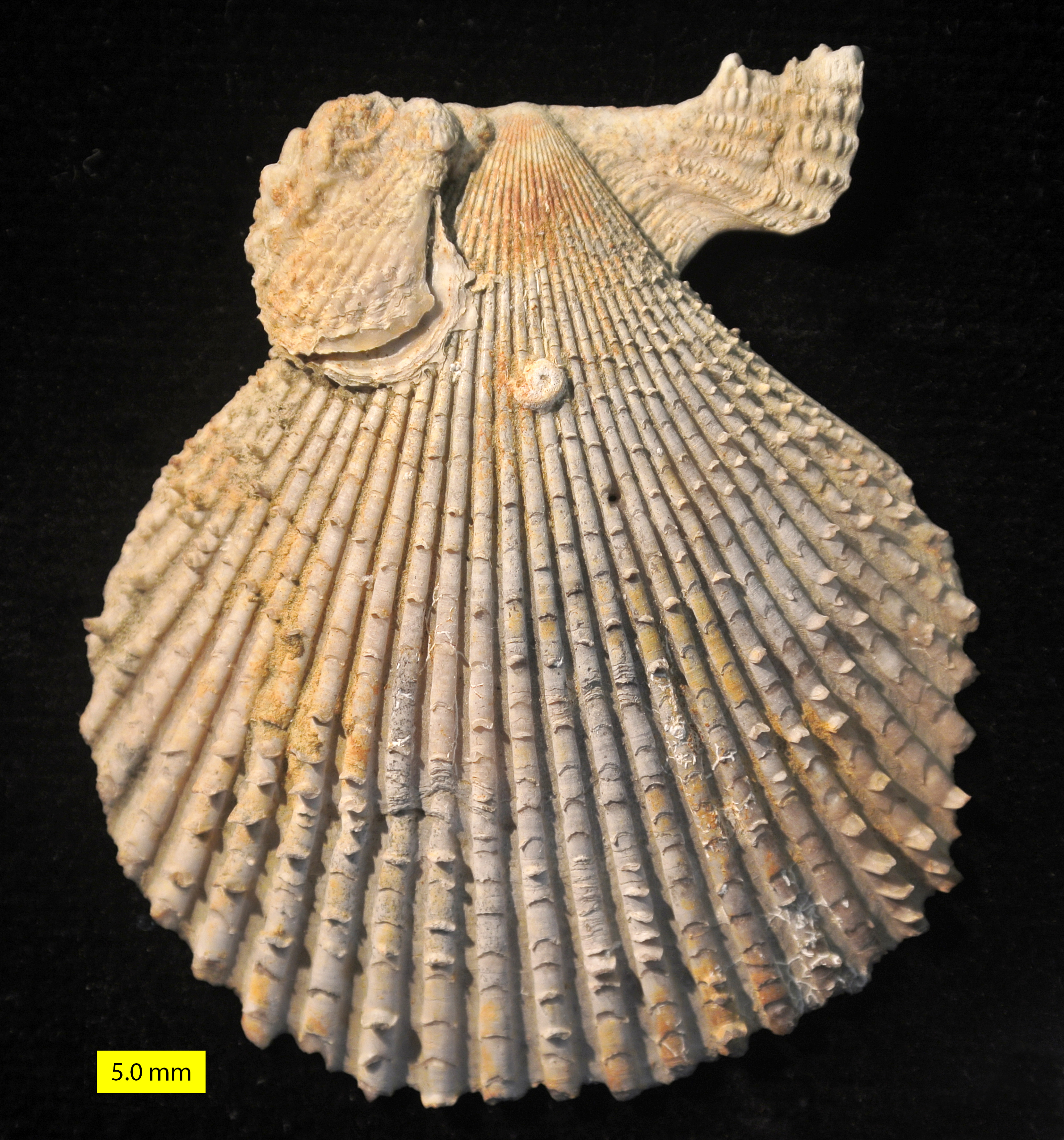
- Fossillized shell of a Chlamys bivalve
  Chlamys
  - †Chlamys anatipes
  - †Chlamys cawcawensis
  - †Chlamys choctavensis
  - †Chlamys deshayesii
  - †Chlamys indecisa
  - †Chlamys nupera
- Chlorostoma
  - †Chlorostoma exolutum
- Clypeaster
  - †Clypeaster cotteaui
- Coccolithus
  - †Coccolithus formosus
  - †Coccolithus pelagicus
- Colaptes
  - †Colaptes auratus
- Colinus
  - †Colinus virginianus
- Coluber
  - †Coluber constrictor
- Conepatus
  - †Conepatus leuconotus
- Conomitra
  - †Conomitra subpontis
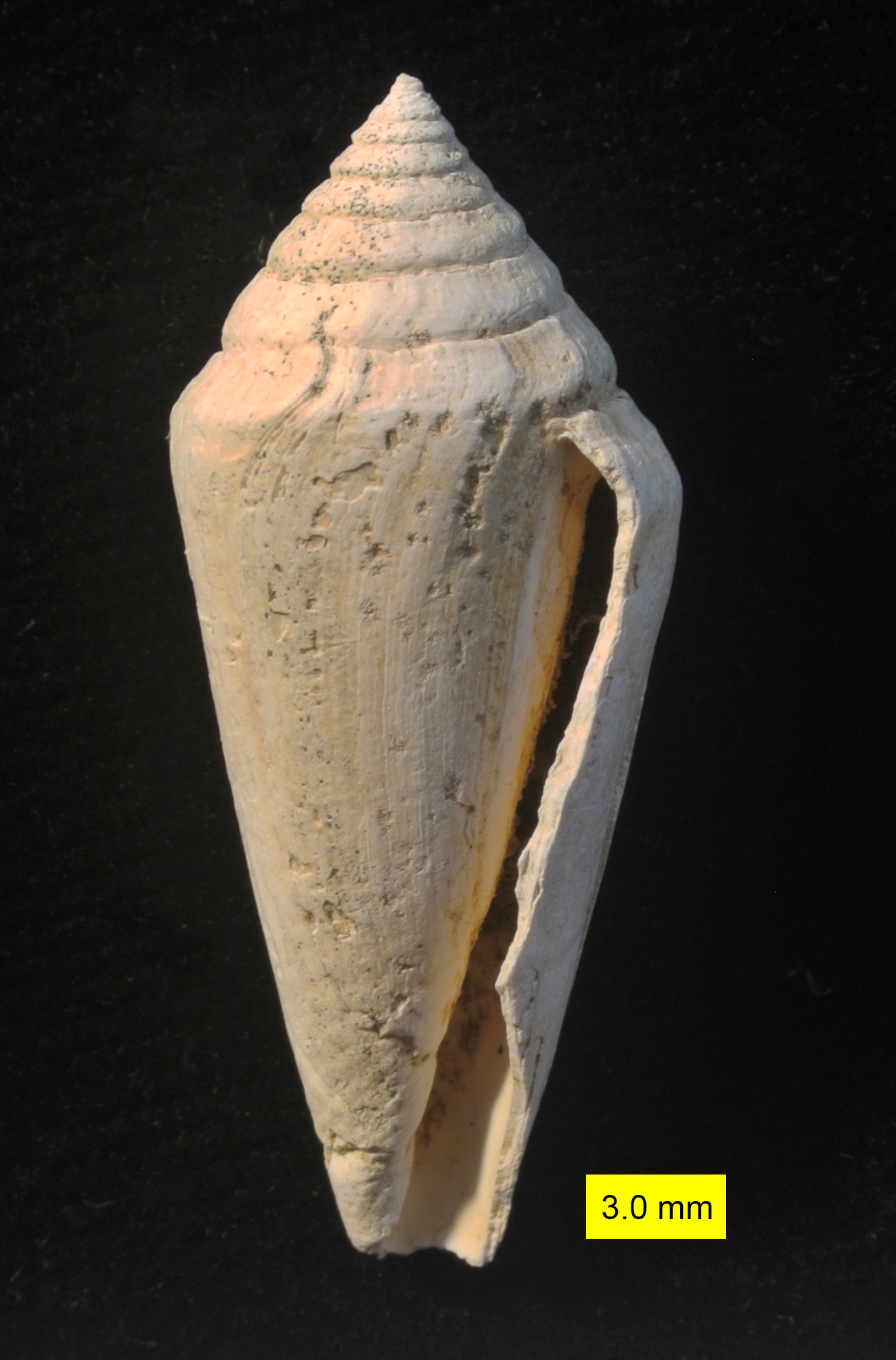
- Fossilized shell of a Conus cone snail
  Conus
  - †Conus cookei
  - †Conus demiurgus
  - †Conus sauridens
  - †Conus vaughani
- †Copemys – or unidentified comparable form
- Coragyps
  - †Coragyps atratus
- Corbula
  - †Corbula alabamiensis
  - †Corbula subcompressa
- Corvus
  - †Corvus brachyrhynchos
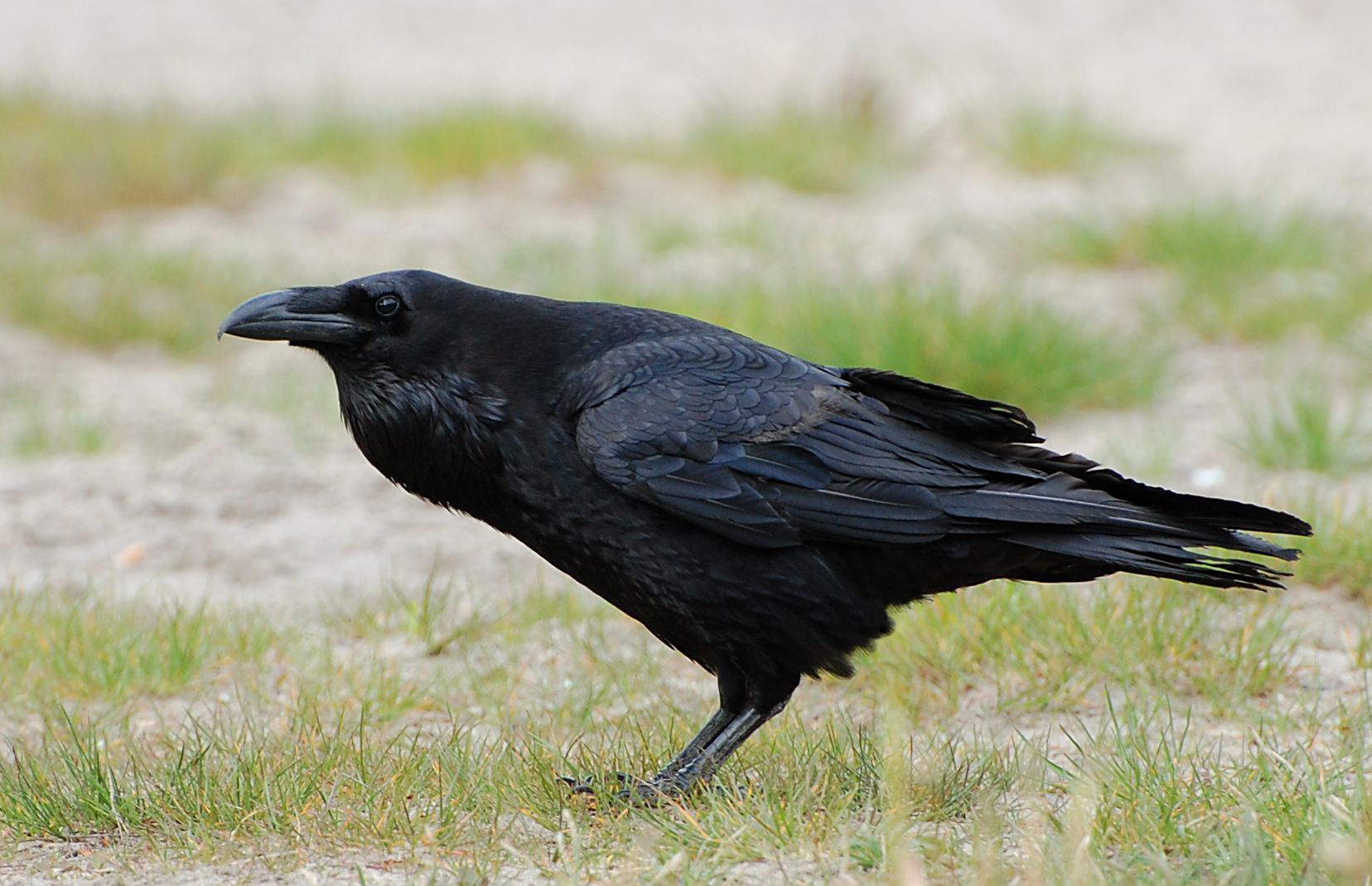
  - A living Corvus corax, or common raven
    †Corvus corax
- Crassatella
  - †Crassatella deformis
  - †Crassatella gabbi
  - †Crassatella ioannes
  - †Crassatella ocordia
- Crassatellites
  - †Crassatellites paramesus
- Crassostrea
  - †Crassostrea virginica
- Crepidula
  - †Crepidula fornicata
- †Cribocentrum
  - †Cribocentrum reticulatum
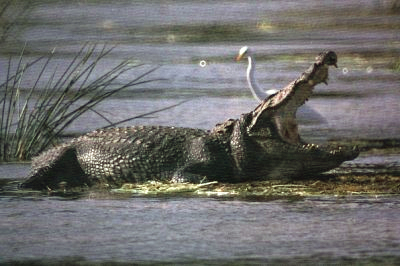
- A living Crocodylus
  Crocodylus
- Crotalus
  - †Crotalus horridus
- Crucibulum
  - †Crucibulum multilineatum
- Ctenoides
  - †Ctenoides tricinta
- †Cubitostrea
  - †Cubitostrea perplicata
  - †Cubitostrea sellaeformis
- Cucullaea
- Cyanocitta
  - †Cyanocitta cristata
- †Cyclicargolithus
  - †Cyclicargolithus pseudogammation
- Cygnus
  - †Cygnus columbianus
- †Cylindracanthus
  - †Cylindracanthus rectus
- Cymatium
  - †Cymatium cecilianum
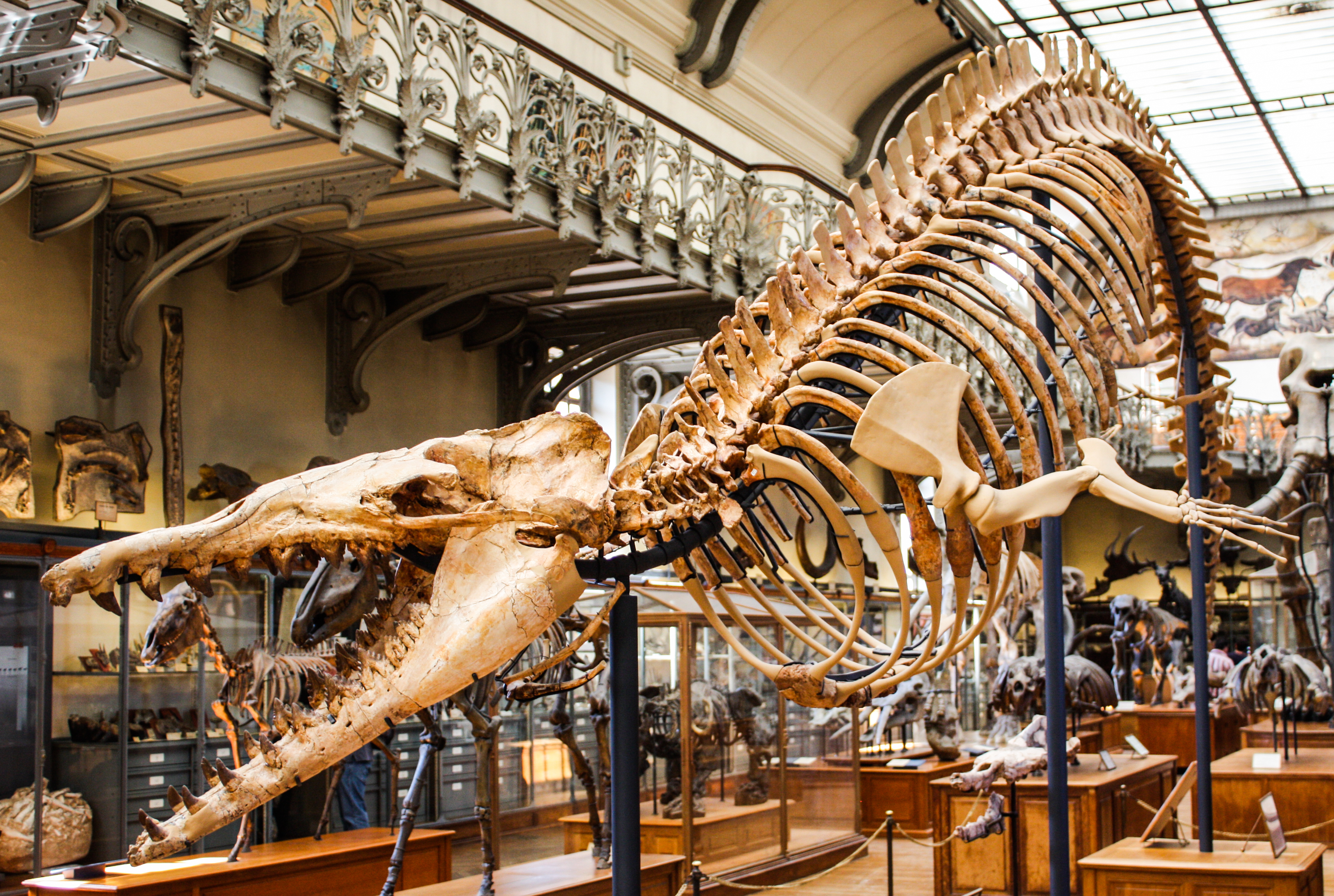
- Mounted fossilized skeleton of the Eocene whale Cynthiacetus
  †Cynthiacetus
  - †Cynthiacetus maxwelli
- Cypraea
- Cyrena
  - †Cyrena floridana

== D ==
- Dasyatis
  - †Dasyatis borodini – type locality for species
  - †Dasyatis charlisae – type locality for species
- Dasypus
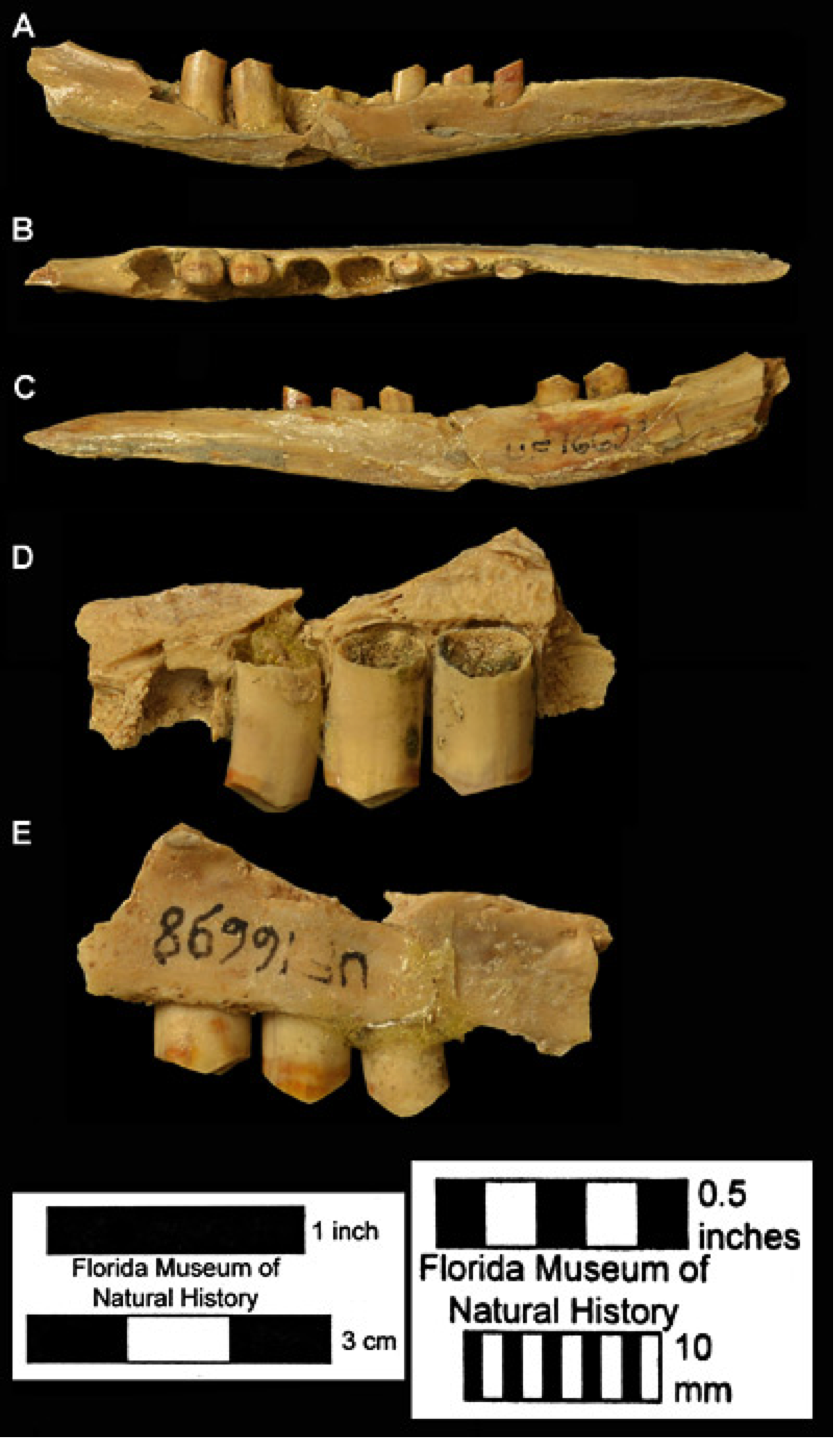
  - Fossilized mandible in multiple views of the Pleistocene Dasypus bellus, or beautiful armadillo
    †Dasypus bellus
- Deirochelys
  - †Deirochelys reticularia
- Dentalium
  - †Dentalium thalloides
- †Dhondtichlamys
  - †Dhondtichlamys greggi
- Diadophis
  - †Diadophis punctatus
- Diastoma
  - †Diastoma georgiana
- Dictyococcites
  - †Dictyococcites bisectus
  - †Dictyococcites scrippsae
- Didelphis
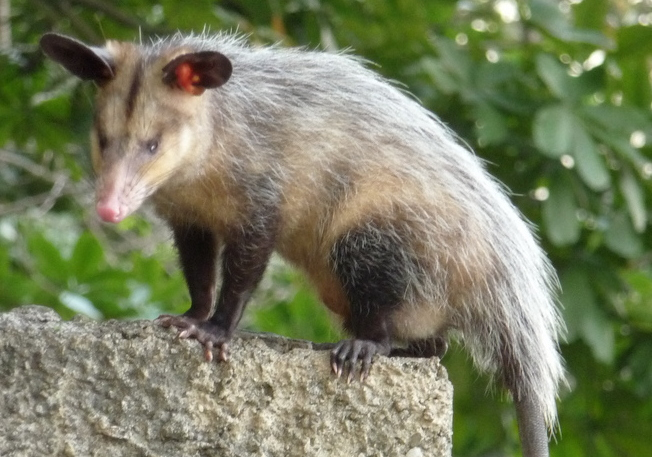
  - A living Didelphis marsupialis, or common opossum
    †Didelphis marsupialis
  - †Didelphis virginiana
- Diodora
  - †Diodora pumpellyi – type locality for species
- †Dioplotherium
  - †Dioplotherium manigaulti
- Diploastrea
  - †Diploastrea crassolamellata
- †Discoaster
  - †Discoaster barbadiensis
- Divalinga
  - †Divalinga quadrisulcata
- Donax
  - †Donax variabilis
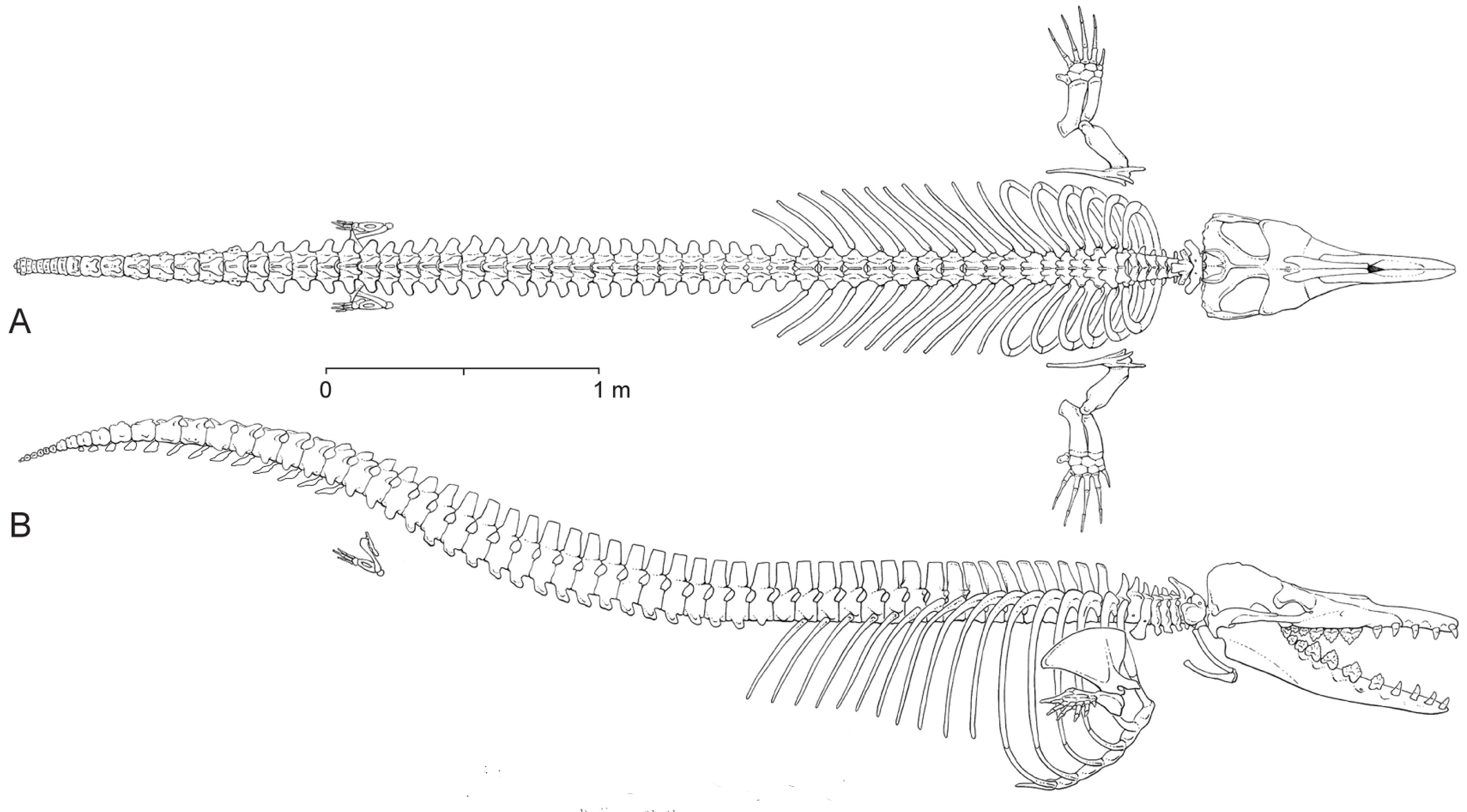
- Dorsal and right lateral views of reconstructed skeleton of Dorudon atrox
  †Dorudon
  - †Dorudon serratus
- Dosinia
- †Dosiniopsis
  - †Dosiniopsis lenticularis
- Dryocopus
  - †Dryocopus pileatus

== E ==
- †Echanthus
  - †Echanthus georgiensis – type locality for species
- Echinolampas
- †Ectopistes
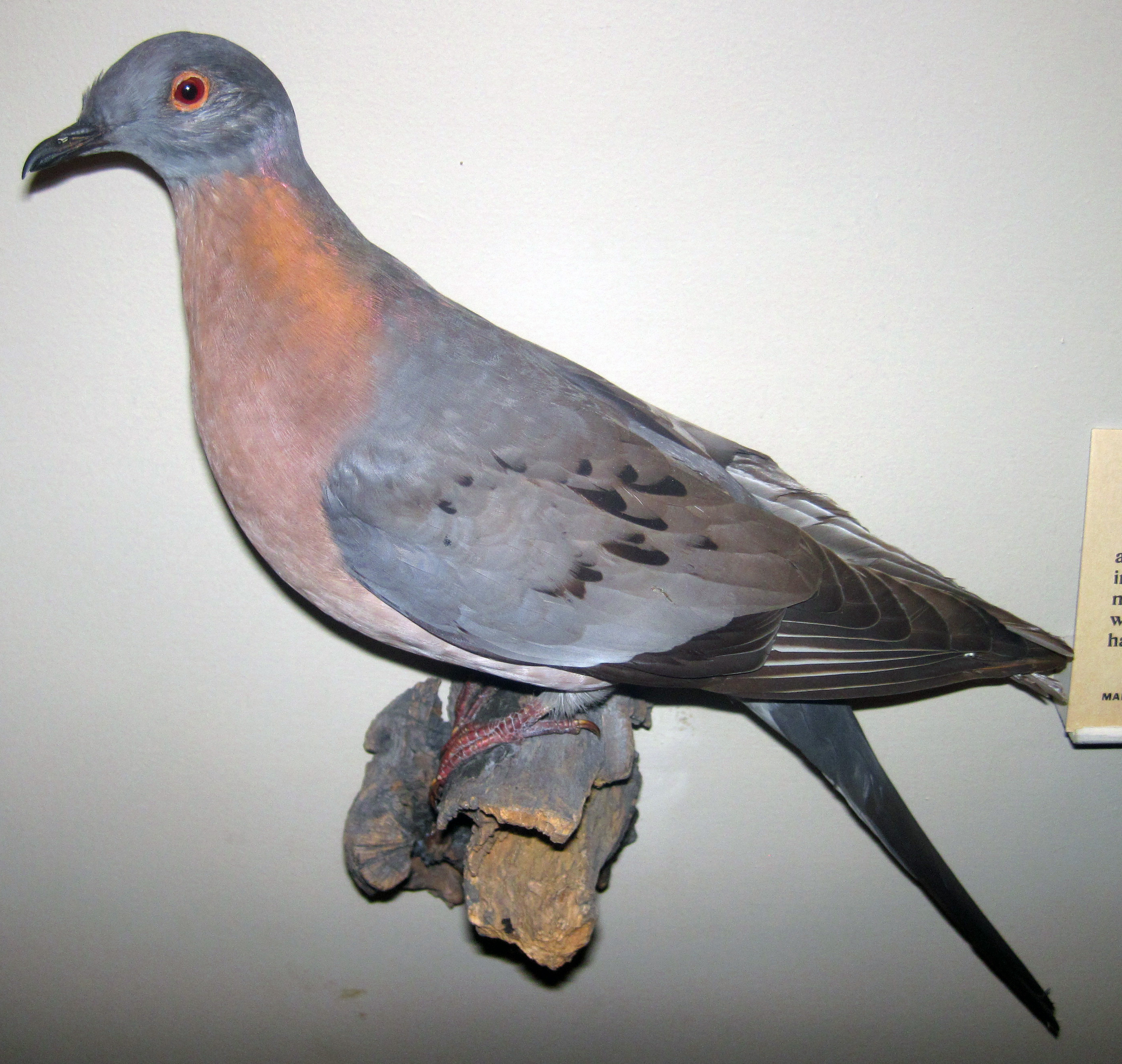
  - Taxidermied male Ectopistes migratorius, or passenger pigeon
    †Ectopistes migratorius
- Edaphodon
- Elops
  - †Elops saurus
- Eontia
  - †Eontia ponderosa
- Epitonium
  - †Epitonium dubiosum
  - †Epitonium rupicola
- Eptesicus
  - †Eptesicus fuscus – or unidentified comparable form
- Equus
  - †Equus complicatus – tentative report
  - †Equus leidyi
  - †Equus litoralis
  - †Equus simplicidens
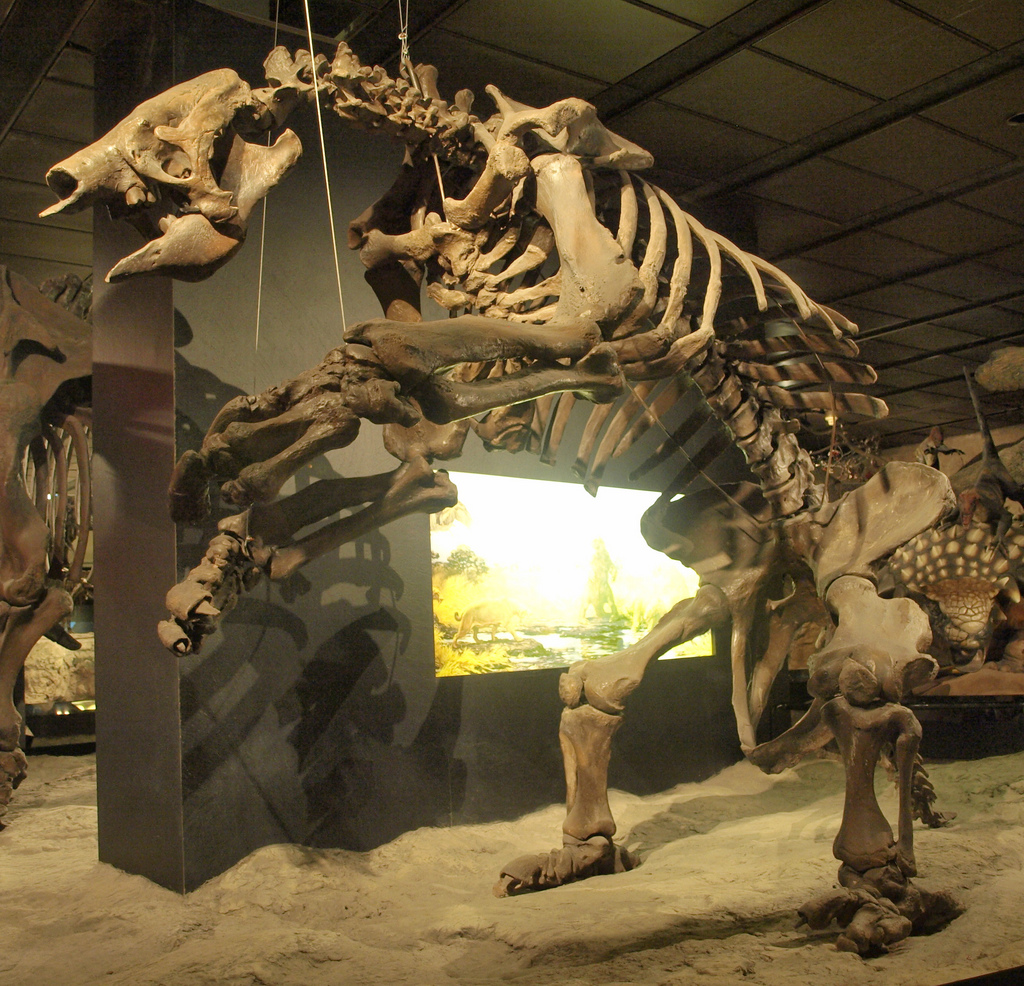
- Mounted fossilized skeleton of the Pliocene-Pleistocene ground sloth Eremotherium
  †Eremotherium
  - †Eremotherium laurillardi
- Eschrichtius
  - †Eschrichtius robustus
- †Eucastor
- Eupatagus
- Eupleura
  - †Eupleura caudata

== F ==
- Falco
  - †Falco sparverius
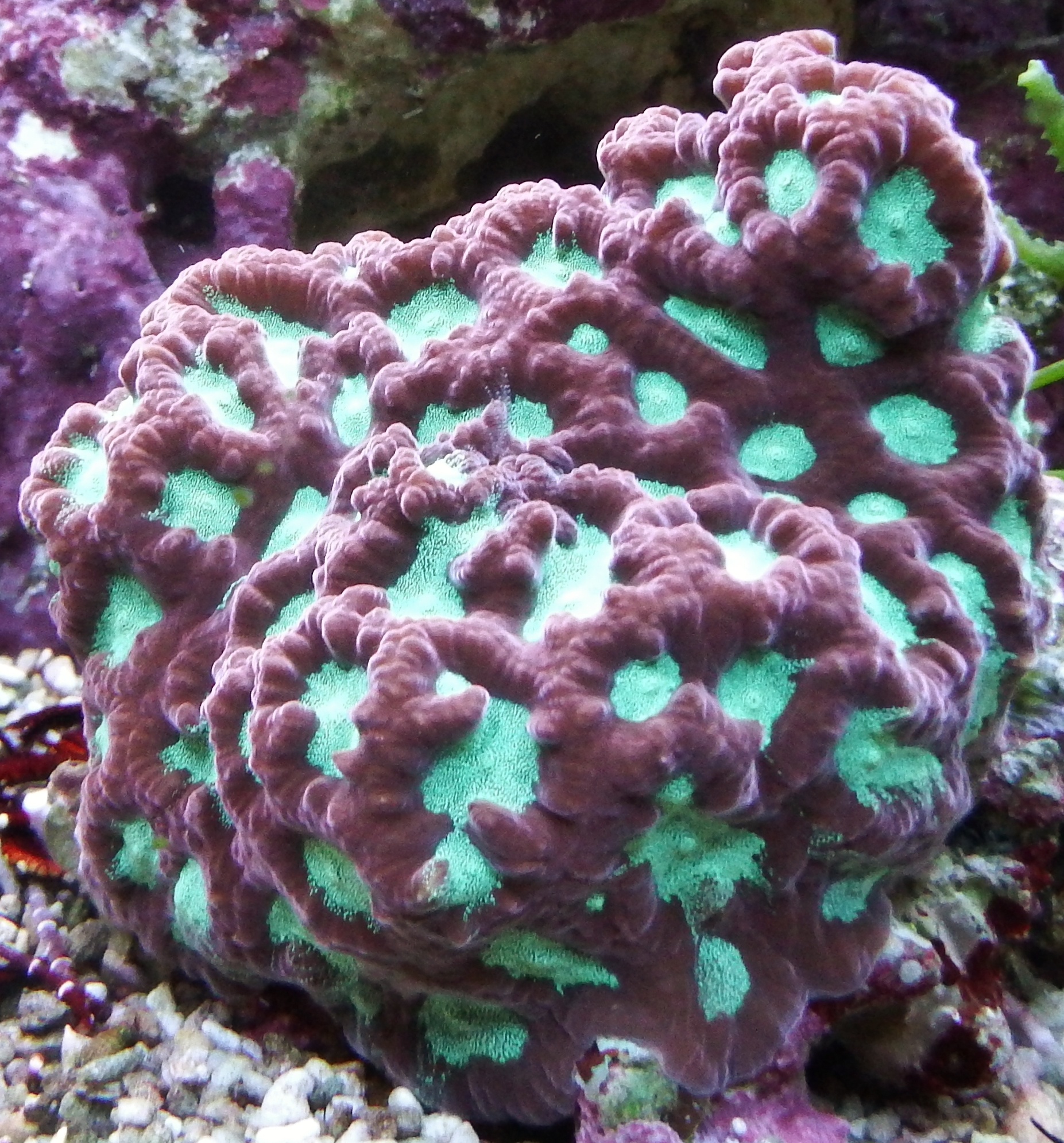
- Living Favites stony coral
  Favites
  - †Favites polygonalis
- Felis
- Floridina
  - †Floridina asymmetrica
- †Fundulus
- Fusinus
  - †Fusinus exilis

== G ==
- Galeocerdo
  - †Galeocerdo alabamensis
  - †Galeocerdo clarkensis
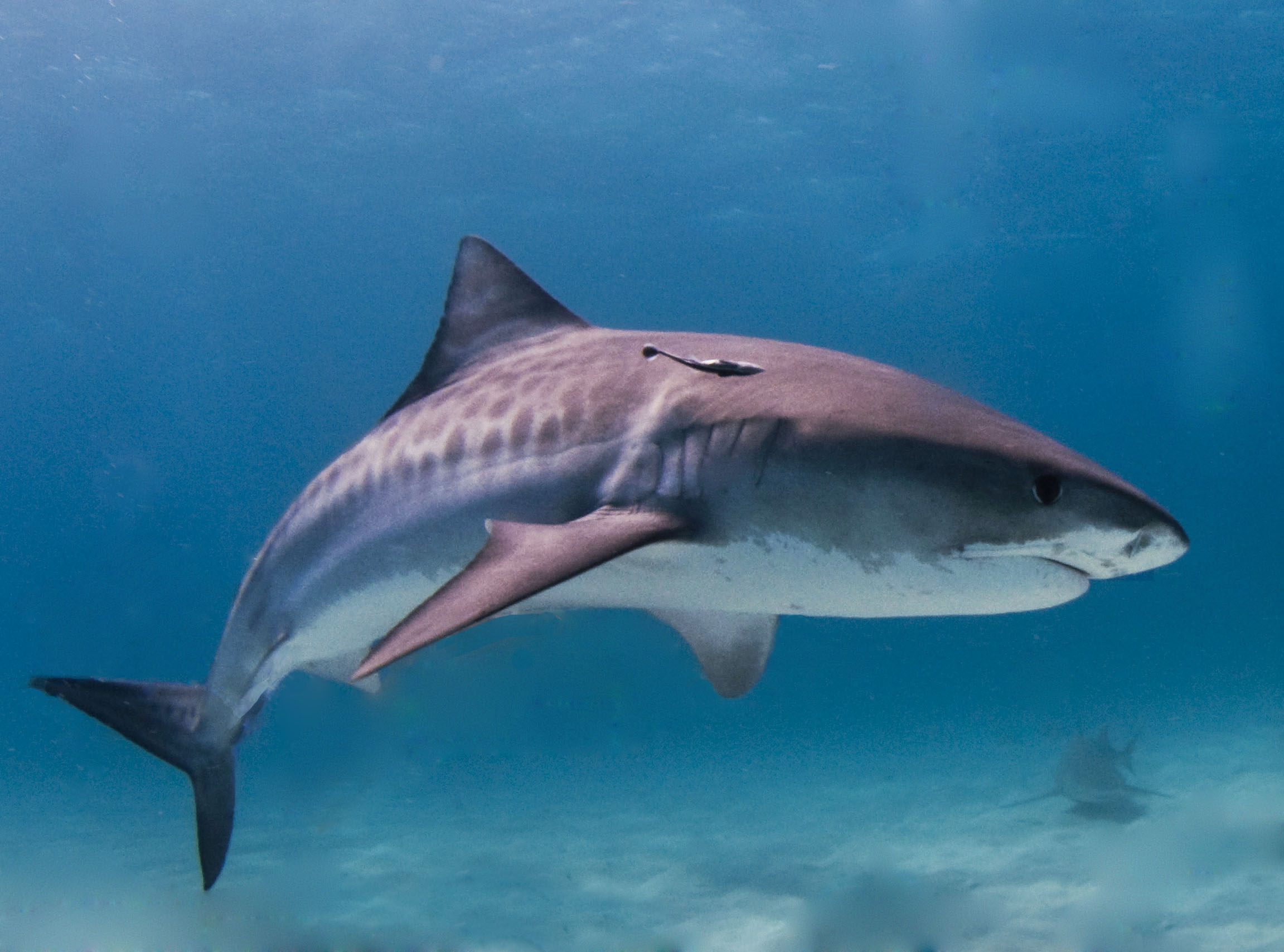
  - A living Galeocerdo cuvier, or tiger shark
    †Galeocerdo cuvier
  - †Galeocerdo latidens
- Galeorhinus
  - †Galeorhinus galeus
  - †Galeorhinus huberensis – type locality for species
- Gari
  - †Gari cerasia
- Gastrochaena
  - †Gastrochaena cimitariopsis
  - †Gastrochaena dalliana
  - †Gastrochaena gainesensis
- Gemma
  - †Gemma purpurea
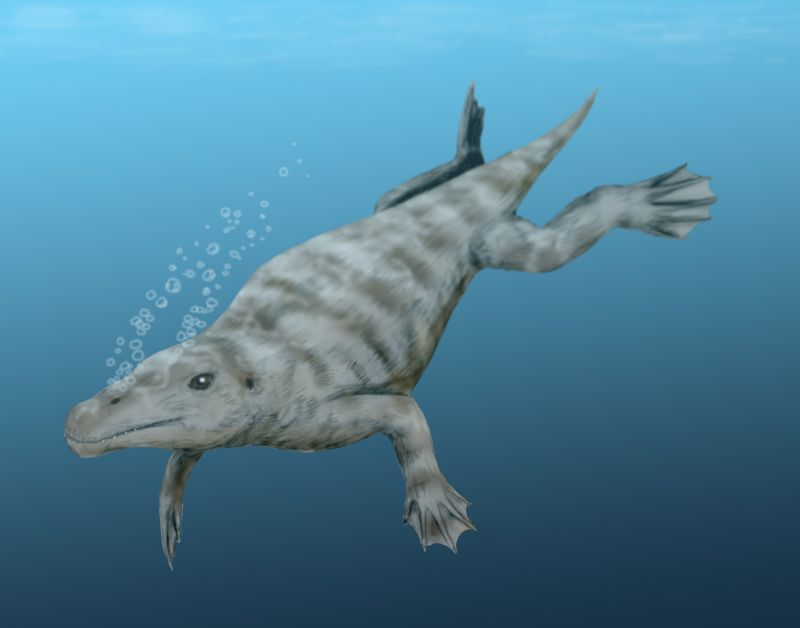
- Life restoration of the Eocene whale Georgiacetus
  †Georgiacetus – type locality for genus
  - †Georgiacetus vogtlensis – type locality for species
- Ginglymostoma
  - †Ginglymostoma cirratum
  - †Ginglymostoma obliquum
  - †Ginglymostoma serra
- †Gitolampas
  - †Gitolampas georgiensis
- Glycymeris
  - †Glycymeris cookei
  - †Glycymeris mississippiensis
- Glyptemys
  - †Glyptemys insculpta
- Goniopora
  - †Goniopora decaturensis – type locality for species
- Gopherus
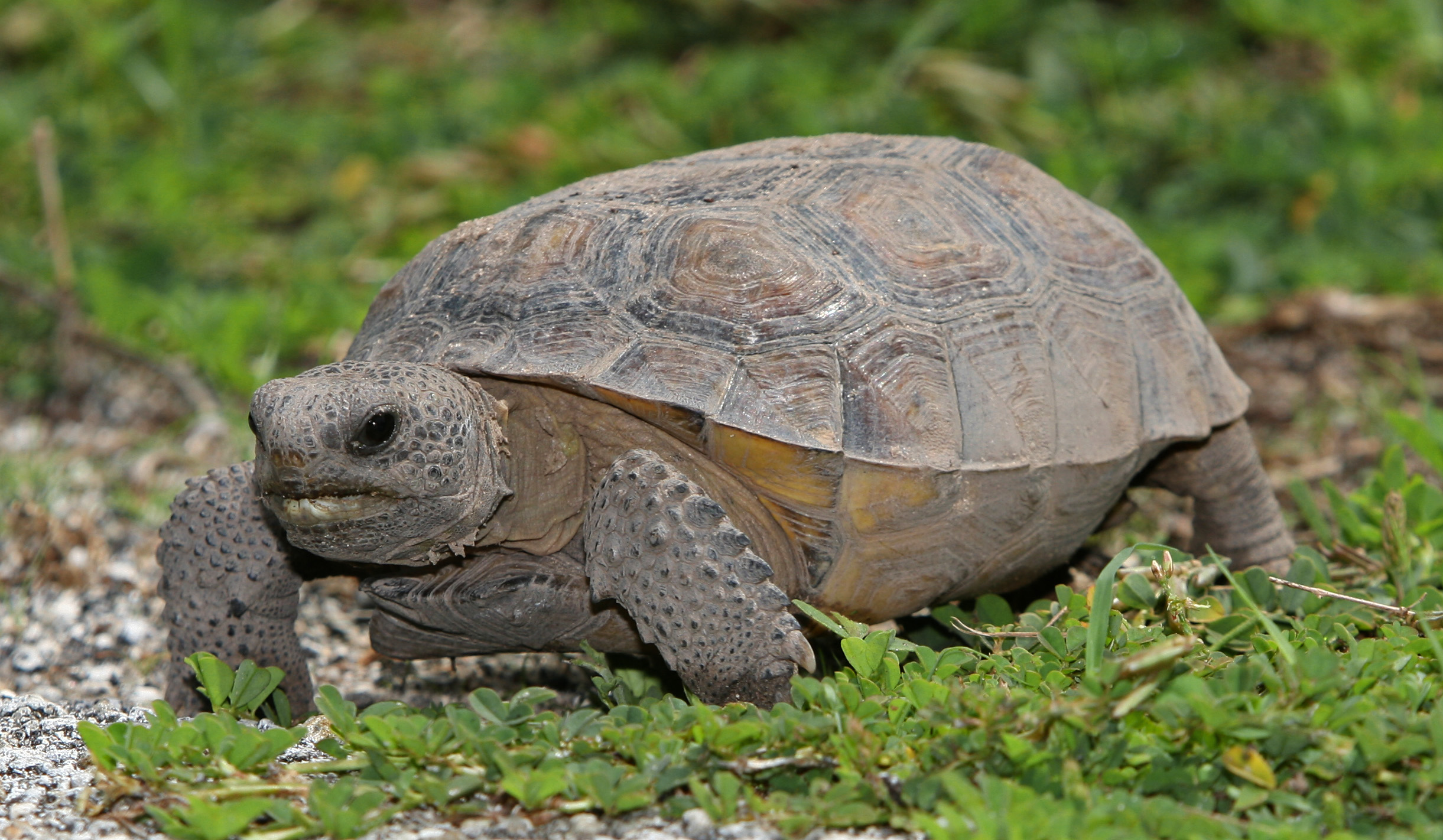
  - A living Gopherus polyphemus, or gopher tortoise
    †Gopherus polyphemus

== H ==
- †Hadralucina – report made of unidentified related form or using admittedly obsolete nomenclature
  - †Hadralucina augustana
- Haustator
  - †Haustator carinata
- †Helicosphaera
  - †Helicosphaera seminulum
- Hemimactra
  - †Hemimactra densa
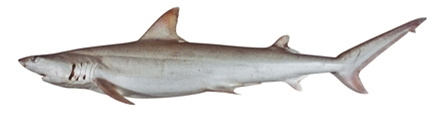
- A living Hemipristis weasel shark
  Hemipristis
  - †Hemipristis curvatus
  - †Hemipristis wyattdurhami
- †Hercoglossa
  - †Hercoglossa ulrichi
- Hesperibalanus
  - †Hesperibalanus huddlestuni – type locality for species
- Hesperisternia
  - †Hesperisternia bainbridgensis – type locality for species
- †Hesperotestudo
  - †Hesperotestudo crassicutata
  - †Hesperotestudo incisa
- Heterodon
  - †Heterodon platyrhinos
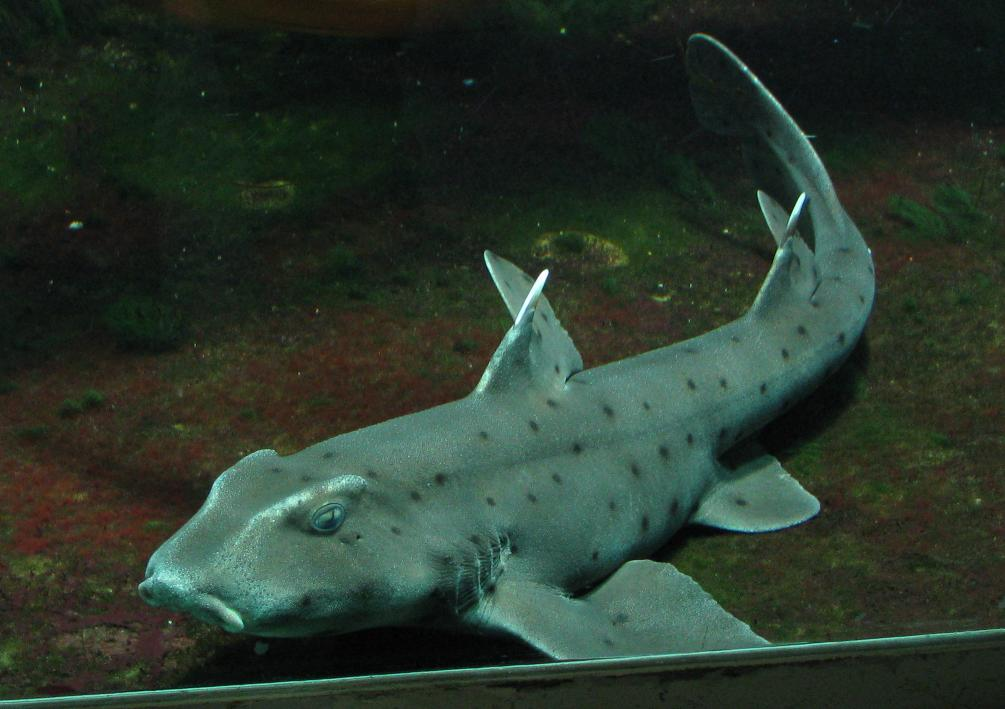
- A living Heterodontus, or bullhead shark
  Heterodontus
  - †Heterodontus pinetti – type locality for species
- Hexaplex
  - †Hexaplex fulvescens
- Hincksina
  - †Hincksina ocalensis
- Hippopleurifera
  - †Hippopleurifera incondita
  - †Hippopleurifera mcbeanensis – type locality for species
- Hippopodina
  - †Hippopodina stephensi – type locality for species
- Hippoporina
  - †Hippoporina vespertilio
- †Hippotherium
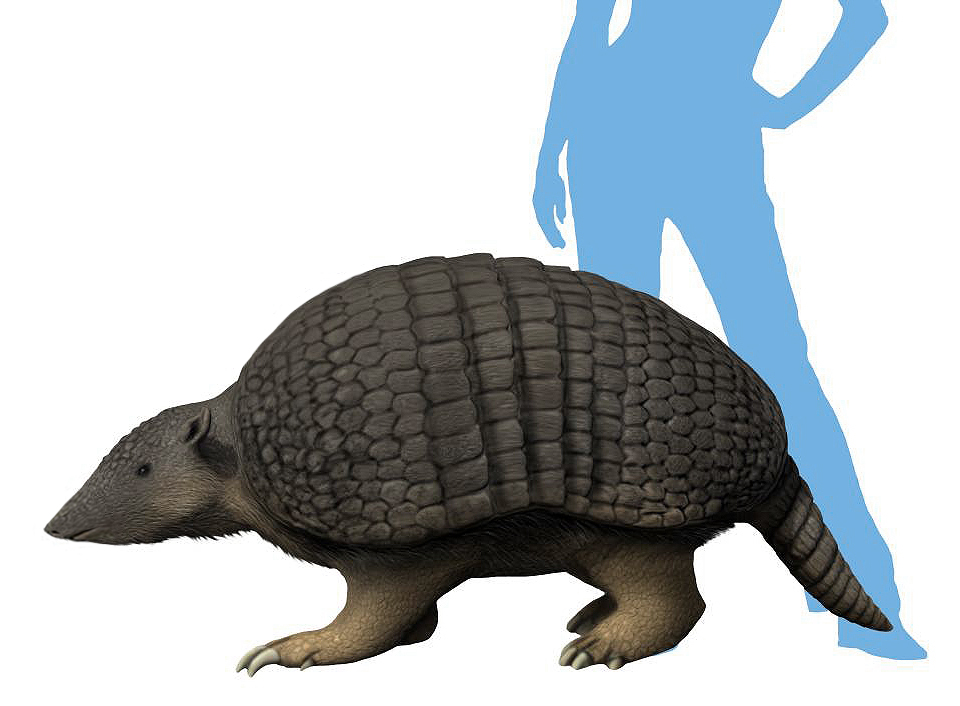
- Life restoration of the Pleistocene armadillo relative Holmesina with a human to scale
  †Holmesina
  - †Holmesina septentrionalis
- †Huberophis – type locality for genus
  - †Huberophis georgiensis – type locality for species
- Hyla
  - †Hyla crucifer

== I ==
- Isurus
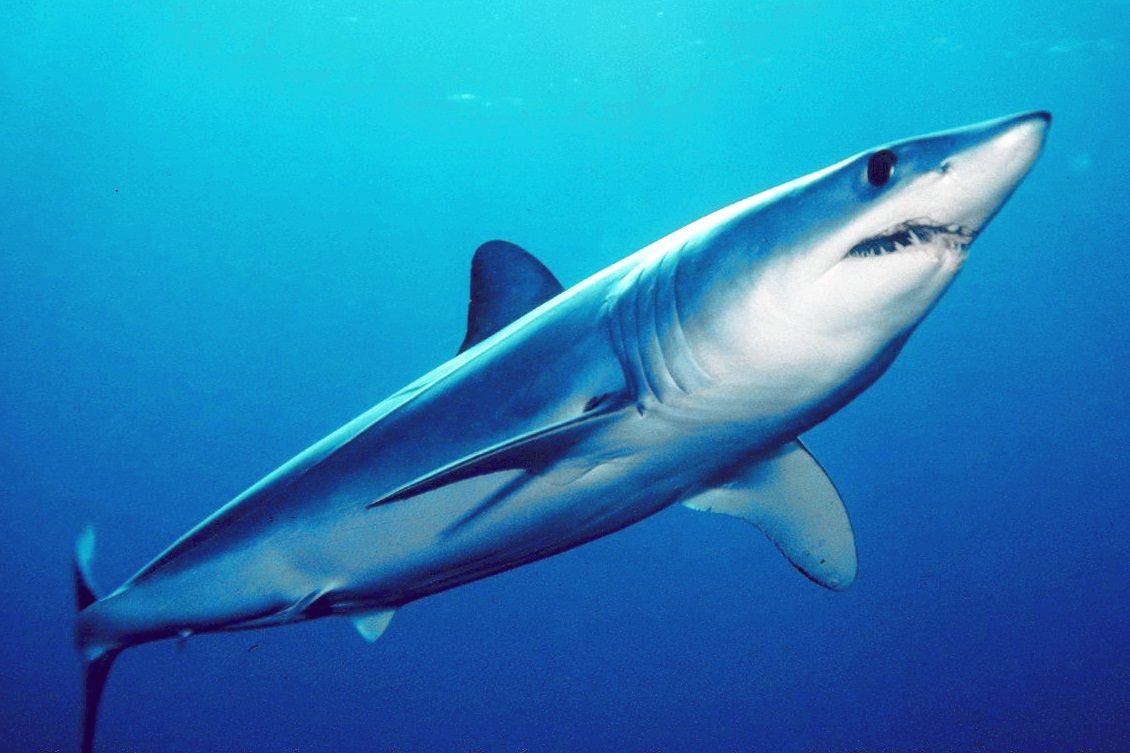
  - A living Isurus oxyrinchus, or shortfin mako shark
    †Isurus oxyrinchus
  - †Isurus praecursor

== K ==
- †Kapalmerella
  - †Kapalmerella mortoni
- †Kathpalmeria
  - †Kathpalmeria georgiana
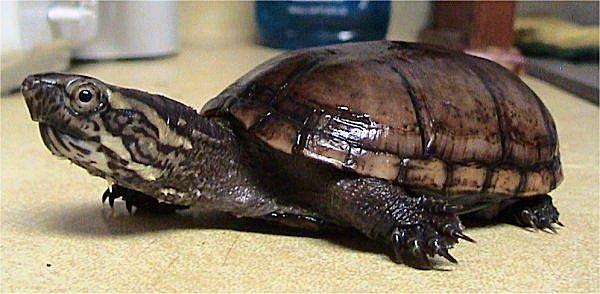
- A living Kinosternon, or mud turtle
  Kinosternon
- †Kleidionella
  - †Kleidionella mcbeanensis – type locality for species

== L ==
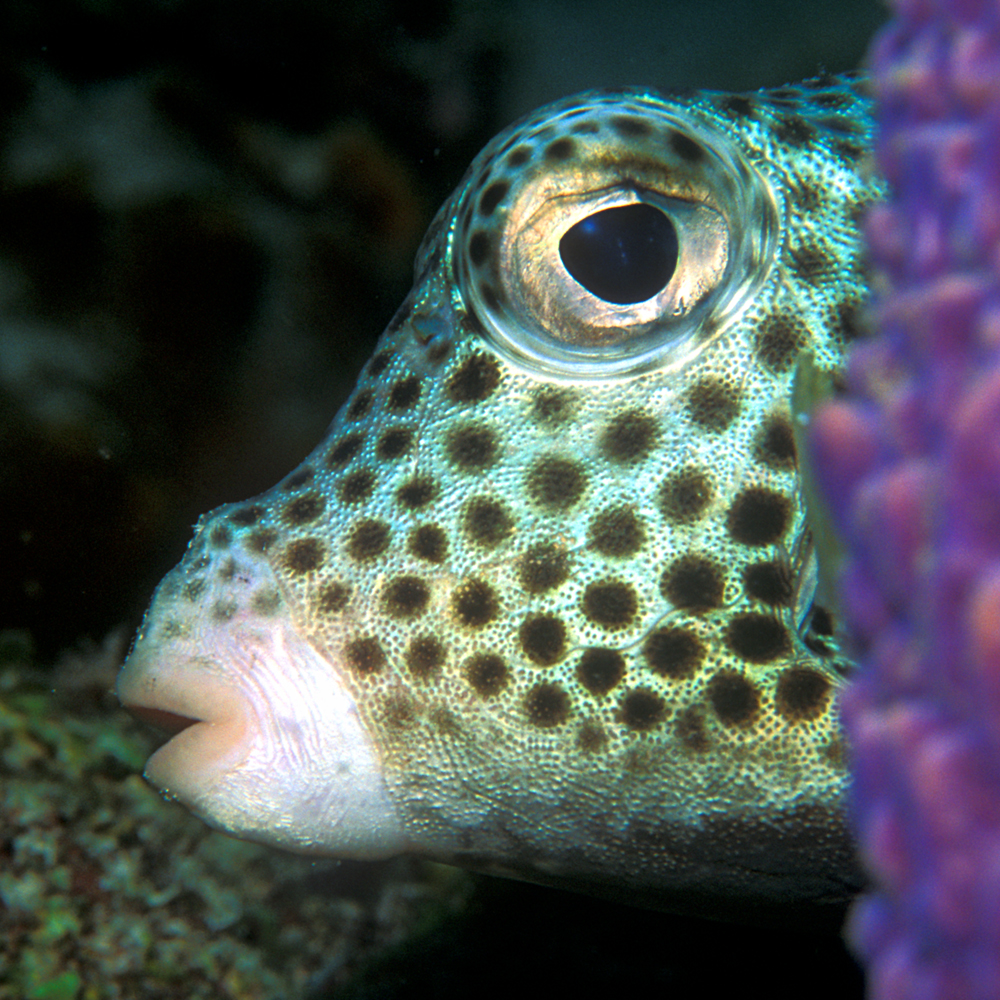
- A living Lactophrys boxfish
  †Lactophrys
- Laevicardium
- †Lagodon
  - †Lagodon rhomboides
- Lamna
  - †Lamna twiggsensis – type locality for species
- Lampropeltis
  - †Lampropeltis getulus
  - †Lampropeltis triangulum
- Leopardus
- †Lepidocyclina
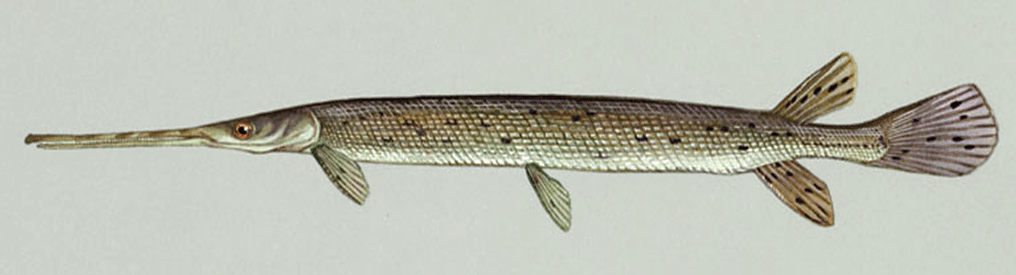
- Illustration of a living Lepisosteus, or gar
  Lepisosteus
- †Leptotragulus
- Lima
  - †Lima halensis
- Lindapecten
  - †Lindapecten chipolanus
- †Linthia
  - †Linthia prima – type locality for species
- Liotia
  - †Liotia halensis
  - †Liotia persculpturata
- Liquidambar
- †Lirodiscus
  - †Lirodiscus tellinoides
- Lithophaga
  - †Lithophaga gainesensis
  - †Lithophaga nuda
- †Lithoporella
- †Litorhadia
  - †Litorhadia bastropensis
- Littoraria
  - †Littoraria irrorata
- Lontra
  - †Lontra canadensis
- Lopha
  - †Lopha vicksburgensis
- Lophelia
  - †Lophelia tubaeformis – type locality for species
- Lophodytes
  - †Lophodytes cucullatus
- †Lophoranina
  - †Lophoranina georgiana
- Lucina
- Lynx
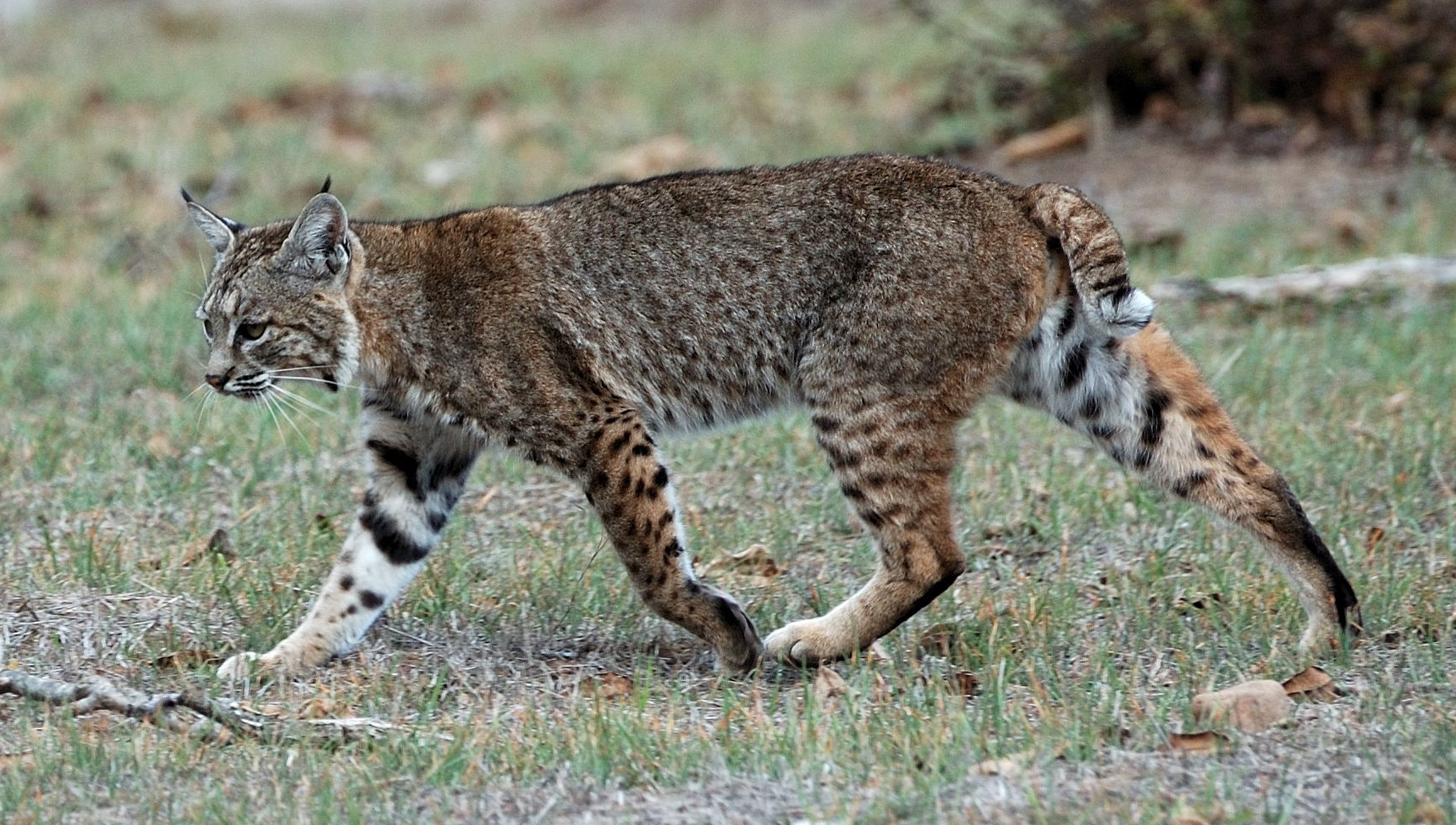
  - A living Lynx rufus, or bobcat
    †Lynx rufus
- Lyria
  - †Lyria mansfieldi
  - †Lyria silicata – or unidentified related form
- †Lyropecten
  - †Lyropecten duncanensis

== M ==
- Macrocallista
  - †Macrocallista subimpressa
- Mactra
  - †Mactra mississippiensis
- Malaclemys
  - †Malaclemys terrapin
- †Mammut
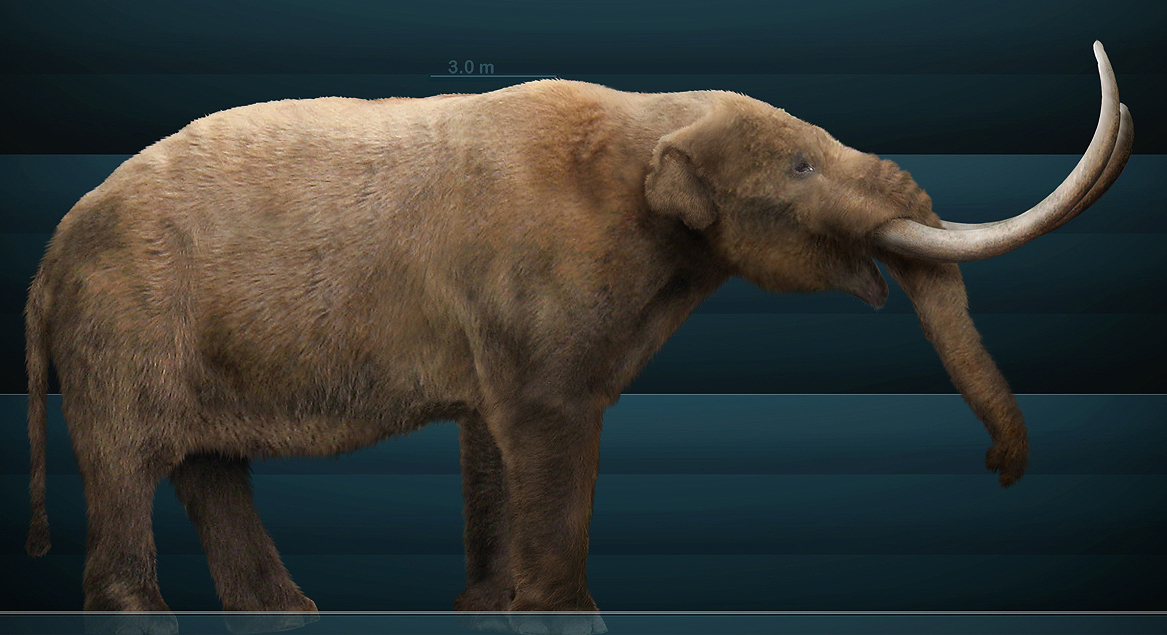
  - Restoration of a Mammut americanum, or American mastodon
    †Mammut americanum
  - †Mammut floridanum
- †Mammuthus
  - †Mammuthus columbi
- Margarites
  - †Margarites crallicus
- Marginella
  - †Marginella halensis
  - †Marginella silicifluvia
- Marmota
  - †Marmota monax
- †Mazzalina – or unidentified comparable form
  - †Mazzalina impressa
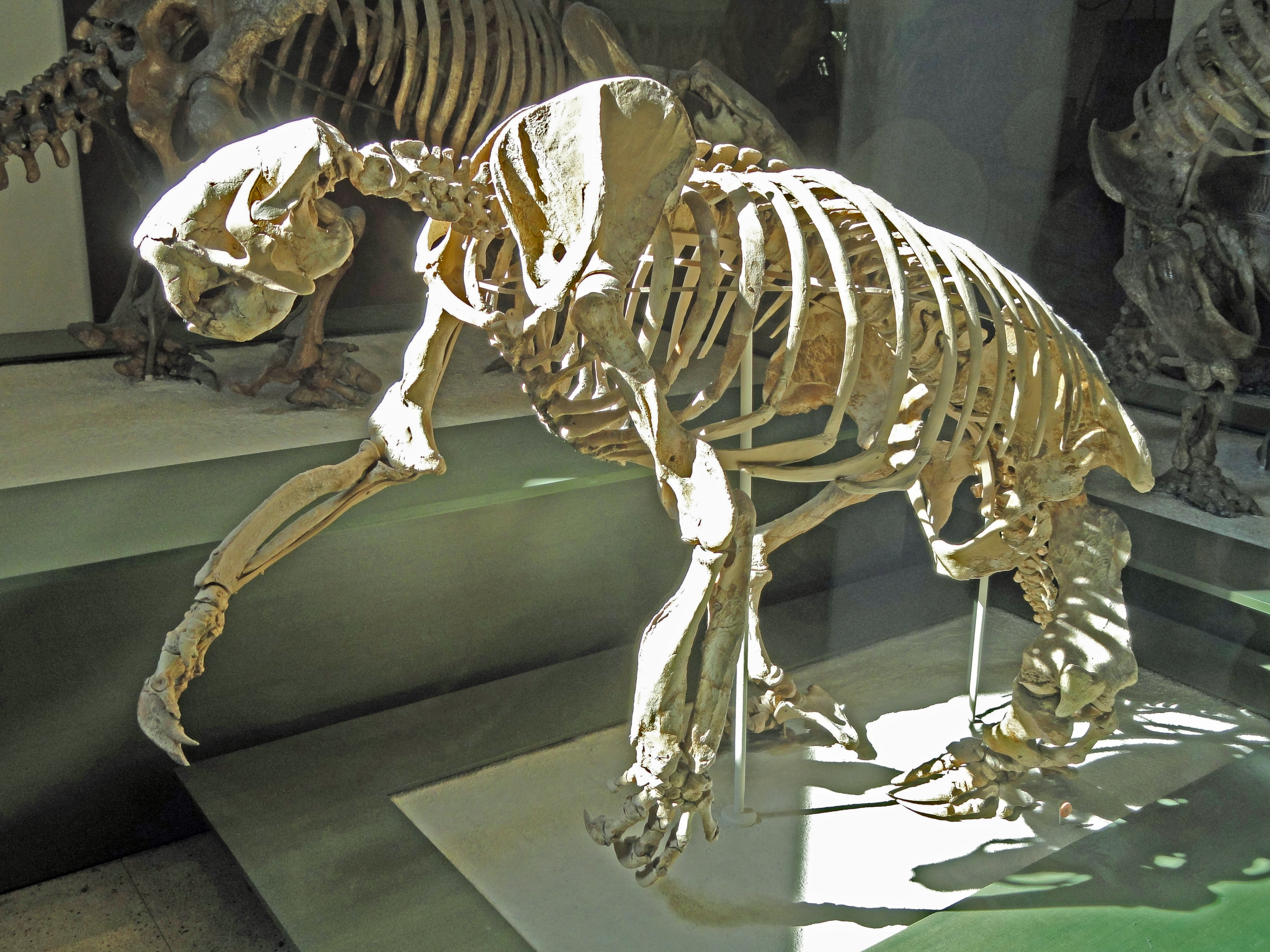
- Mounted fossilized skeleton of the Miocene-Pleistocene ground sloth Megalonyx
  †Megalonyx
- †Megatherium
  - †Megatherium americanum
  - †Megatherium mirable
- Melanerpes
- Meleagris
  - †Meleagris gallopavo
- Melongena
  - †Melongena corona
- Membraniporidra
- Mephitis
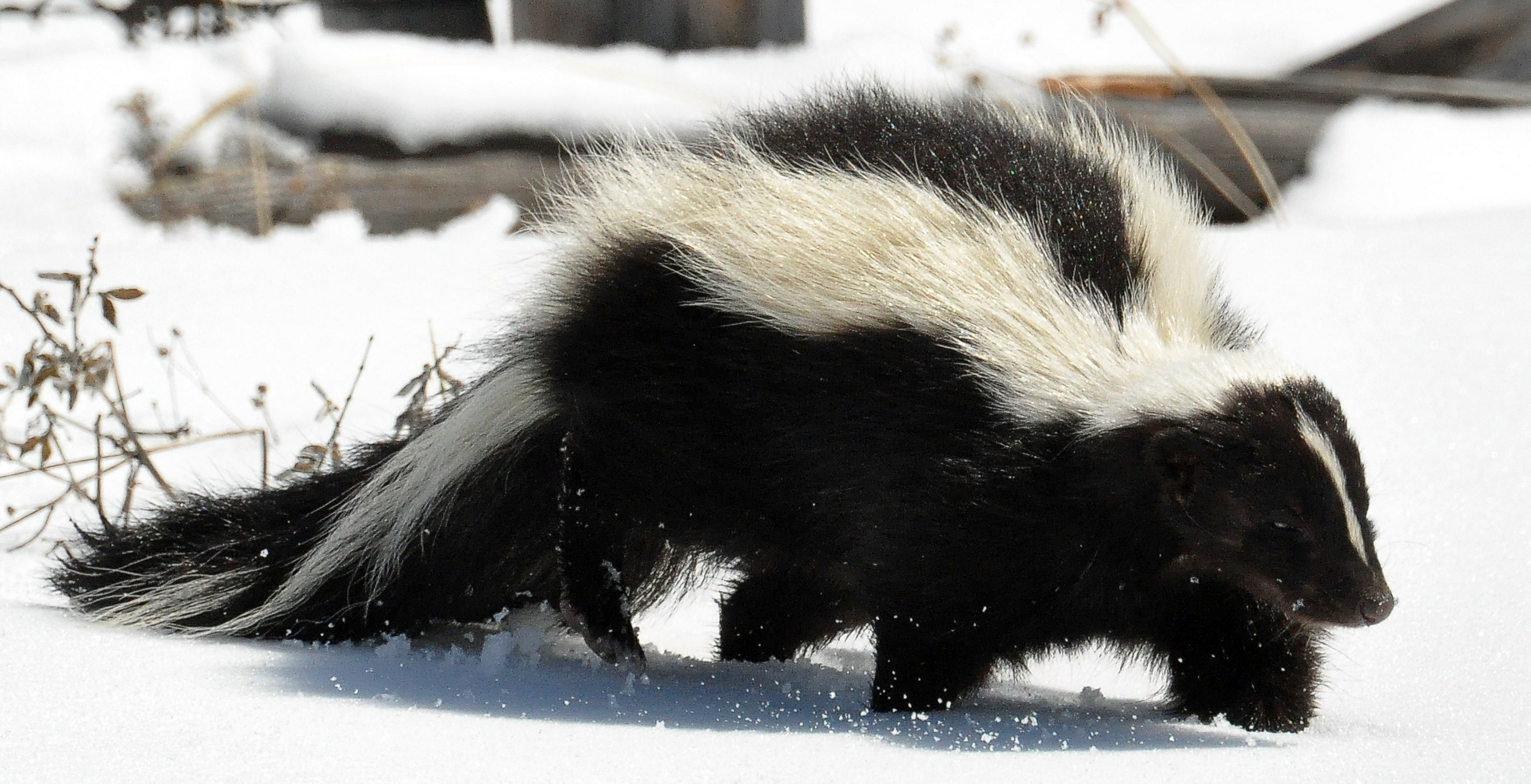
  - A living Mephitis mephitis, or striped skunk
    †Mephitis mephitis
- Mercenaria
  - †Mercenaria langdoni
  - †Mercenaria mercenaria
  - †Mercenaria prodroma
- Meretrix
  - †Meretrix calcanea
  - †Meretrix silicifluvia
- Mesalia
  - †Mesalia alabamiensis
  - †Mesalia georgiana
  - †Mesalia pumila
  - †Mesalia vetusta
- †Mesomorpha – report made of unidentified related form or using admittedly obsolete nomenclature
- †Metradolium
  - †Metradolium areolatum – type locality for species
- Microtus
  - †Microtus pennsylvanicus
  - †Microtus pinetorum
- Miltha
  - †Miltha claibornensis
  - †Miltha hillsboroensis
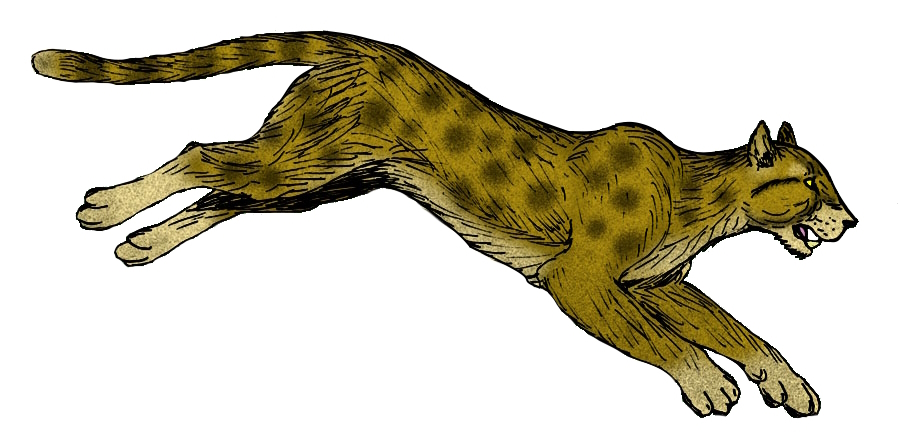
- Restoration of the Pliocene-Pleistocene Miracinonyx, or American cheetah
  †Miracinonyx
  - †Miracinonyx inexpectatus – or unidentified comparable form
- Mitra
  - †Mitra syra
- Modiolaria
- Modiolus
  - †Modiolus grammatus
  - †Modiolus subpontis
- †Monosaulax – or unidentified comparable form
- Montastraea
  - †Montastraea bainbridgensis – type locality for species
- Mugil
- Mulinia
  - †Mulinia congesta
  - †Mulinia lateralis
- Mustela
  - †Mustela frenata – or unidentified comparable form
- †Mustules
  - †Mustules vanderhoefti
- Myliobatis
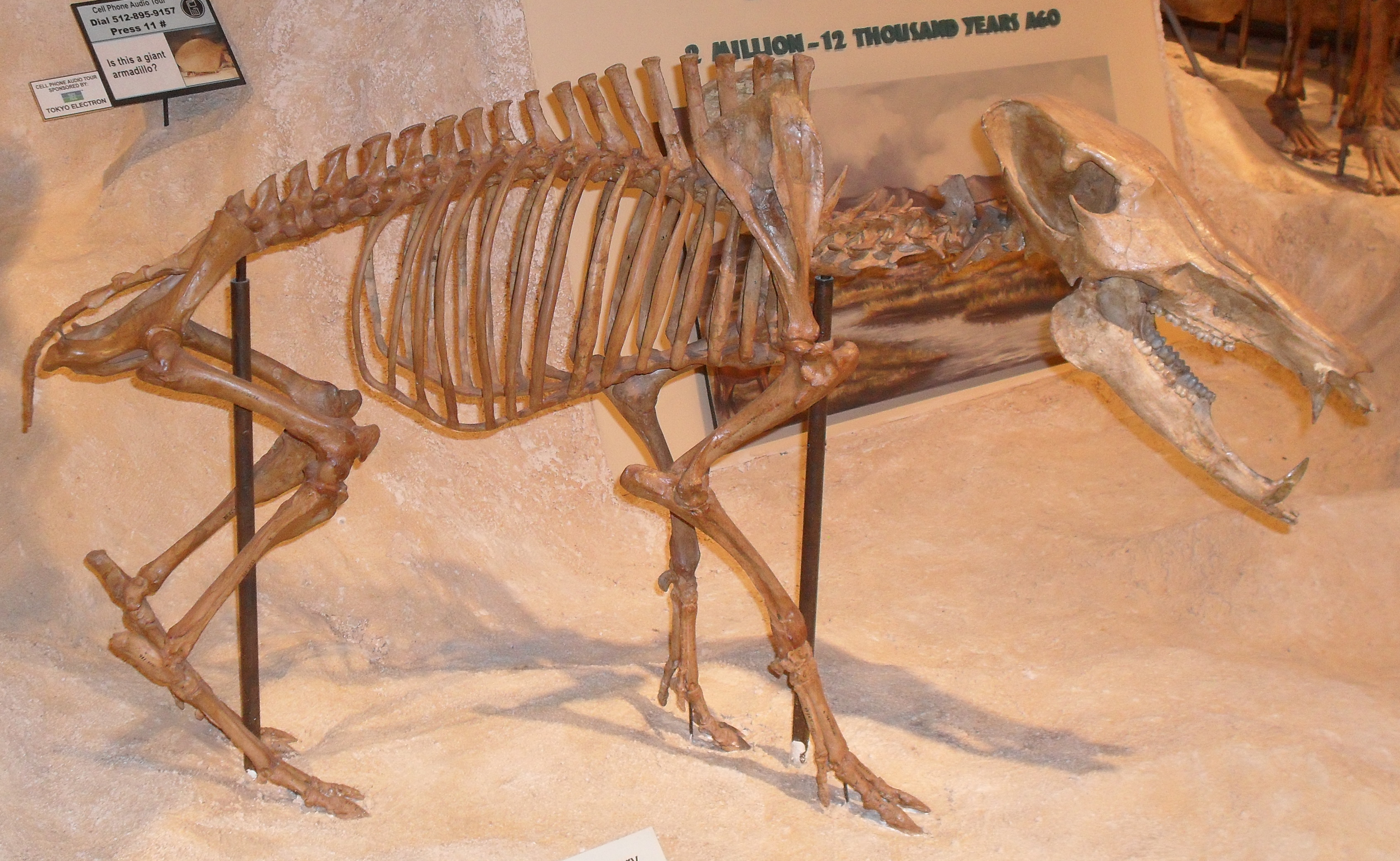
- Fossilized skeleton of the Pliocene-Holocene peccary Mylohyus
  †Mylohyus
  - †Mylohyus fossilis
- Myotis
  - †Myotis grisescens – or unidentified comparable form
  - †Myotis lucifugus – or unidentified comparable form

== N ==
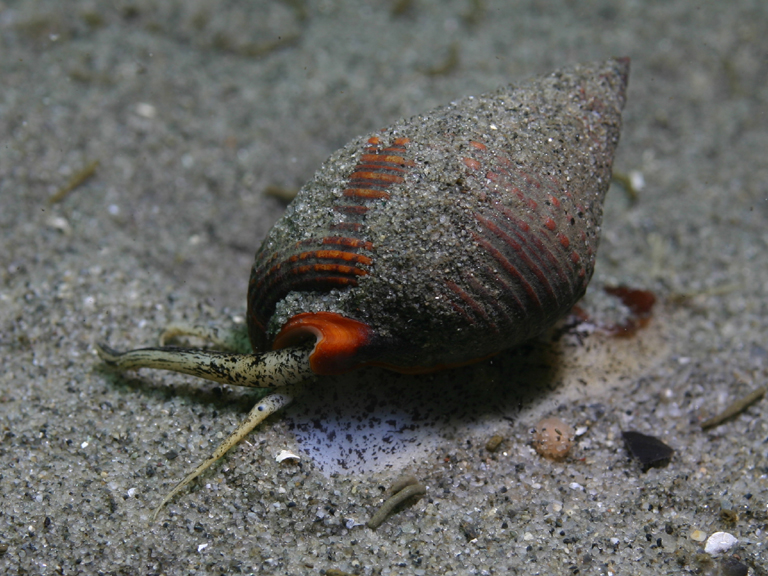
- A living Nassarius, or nassa mud snail
  Nassarius
  - †Nassarius acutus
  - †Nassarius rabdota – type locality for species
- Natica
  - †Natica mediavia
- †Nebraskophis
- Nebrius
  - †Nebrius theilensis
- Negaprion
  - †Negaprion brevirostris
  - †Negaprion eurybathrodon
- †Negaprior
  - †Negaprior eurybathrodon
- Nellia
  - †Nellia tenella
- †Neochoerus
  - †Neochoerus aesopi
  - †Neochoerus pinckneyi – or unidentified comparable form
- Neofiber
  - †Neofiber alleni
- Neomonachus
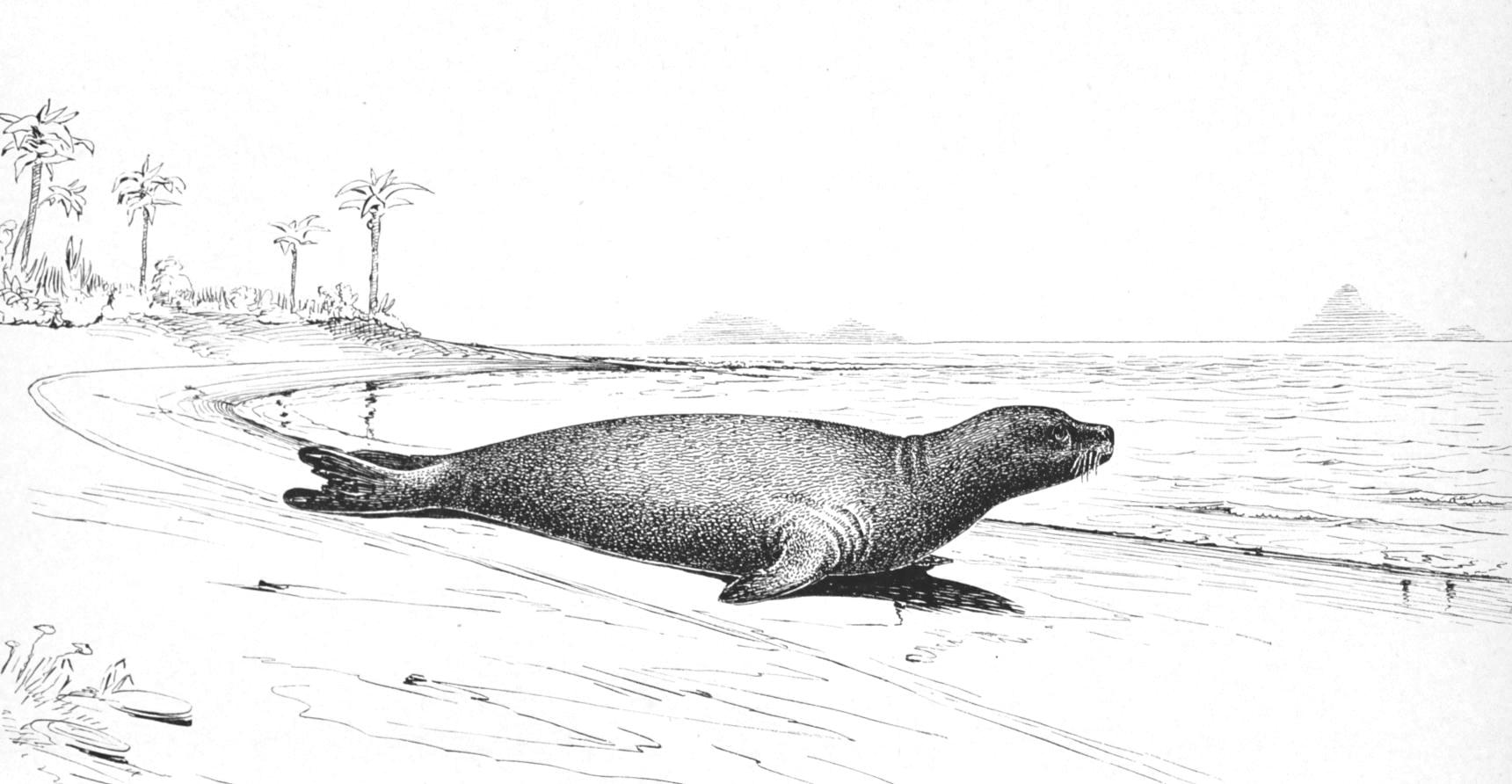
  - Illustration of the recently extinct Neomonachus tropicalis, or Caribbean monk seal
    †Neomonachus tropicalis
- Neotoma
  - †Neotoma floridana
- Nerita
  - †Nerita tampaensis
- Neritina
- Nerodia
  - †Nerodia fasciata
  - †Nerodia sipedon
- Neverita
  - †Neverita duplicatus
  - †Neverita eucallosus
- Notophthalmus
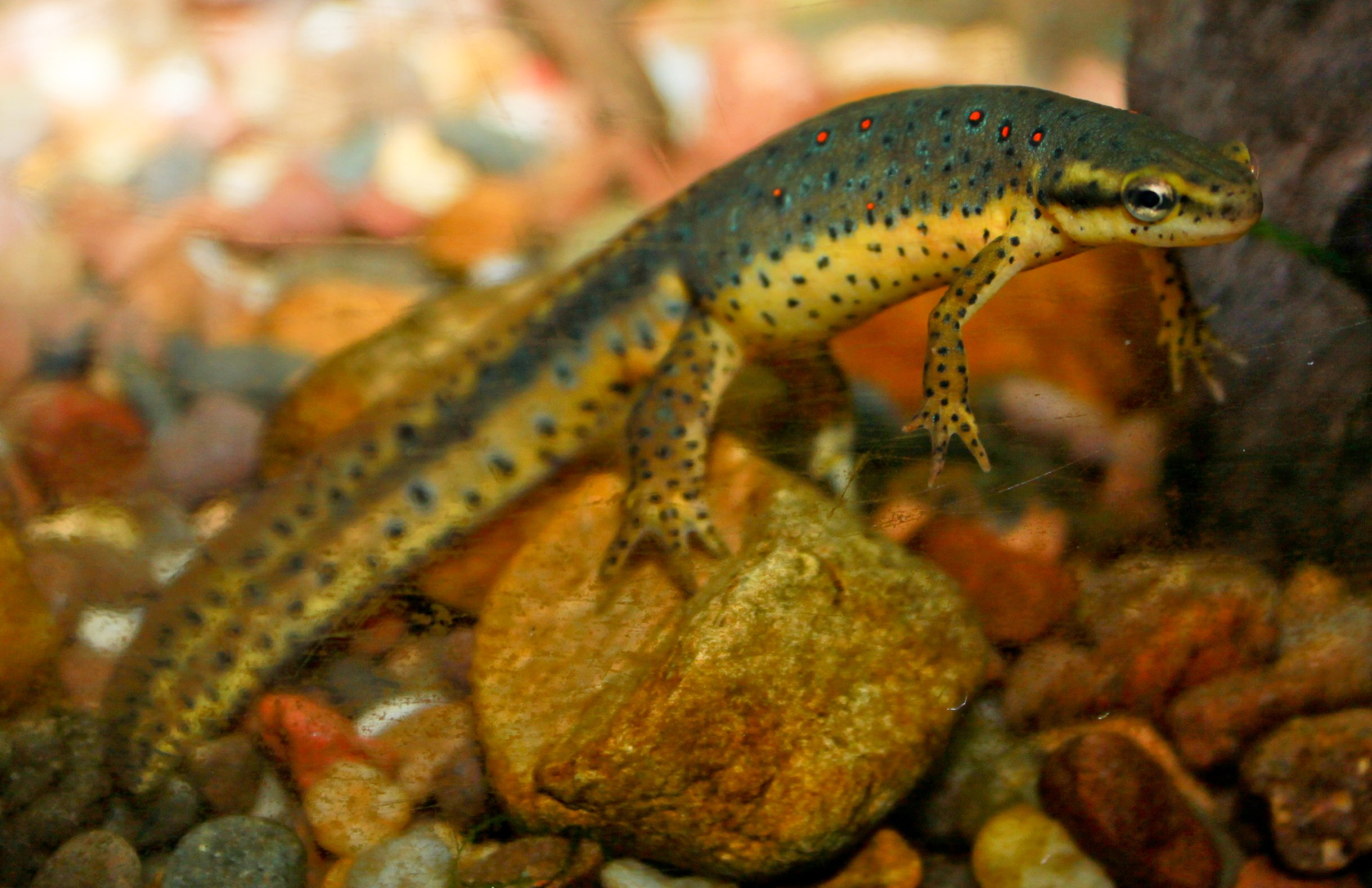
  - A living Notophthalmus viridescens, or eastern newt
    †Notophthalmus viridescens
- Nucleolites
  - †Nucleolites gouldii
- Nucula
  - †Nucula ovula
  - †Nucula proxima
- Nuculana
  - †Nuculana magna
  - †Nuculana saffordana
  - †Nuculana trumani
- Nummulites
  - †Nummulites wilcoxi

== O ==
- †Ochetosella
  - †Ochetosella jacksonica
  - †Ochetosella parva – type locality for species
- Odocoileus
  - †Odocoileus virginianus
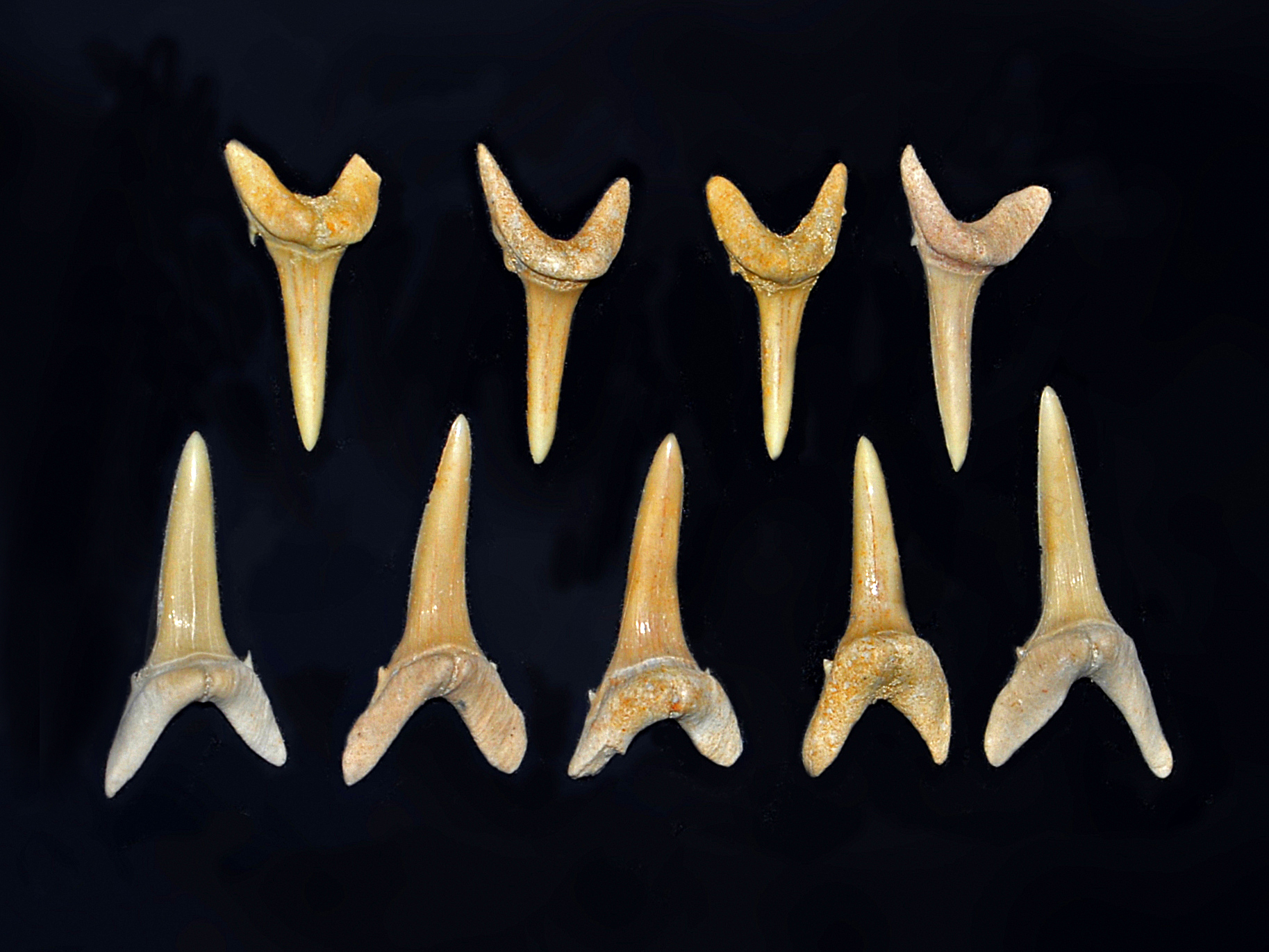
- Fossil teeth of Odontaspis winkleri from Khouribga (Morocco), 55-45 mya
  Odontaspis
  - †Odontaspis acutissima
- †Odontogryphaea
  - †Odontogryphaea thirsae
- †Ogmophis
  - †Ogmophis voorhiesi – type locality for species
- †Oligopygus
  - †Oligopygus haldermani
  - †Oligopygus rotundus
- †Oligotresium
  - †Oligotresium howei – type locality for species
- Oliva
  - †Oliva sayana
- Ondatra
  - †Ondatra zibethicus
- †Ontocetus
  - †Ontocetus emmonsi
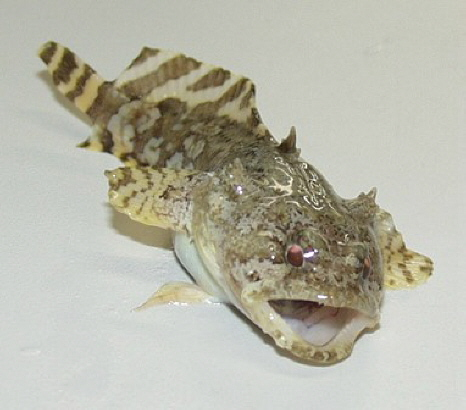
- A living Opsanus toadfish
  †Opsanus
- †Orbitoides
  - †Orbitoides papyracea
- †Orthaulax
  - †Orthaulax hernandoensis
- †Orthosurcula
  - †Orthosurcula indenta
- Oryzomys
  - †Oryzomys palustris
- Ostrea
  - †Ostrea crenulimarginata
  - †Ostrea mauricensis
  - †Ostrea podagrina
  - †Ostrea sinuosa
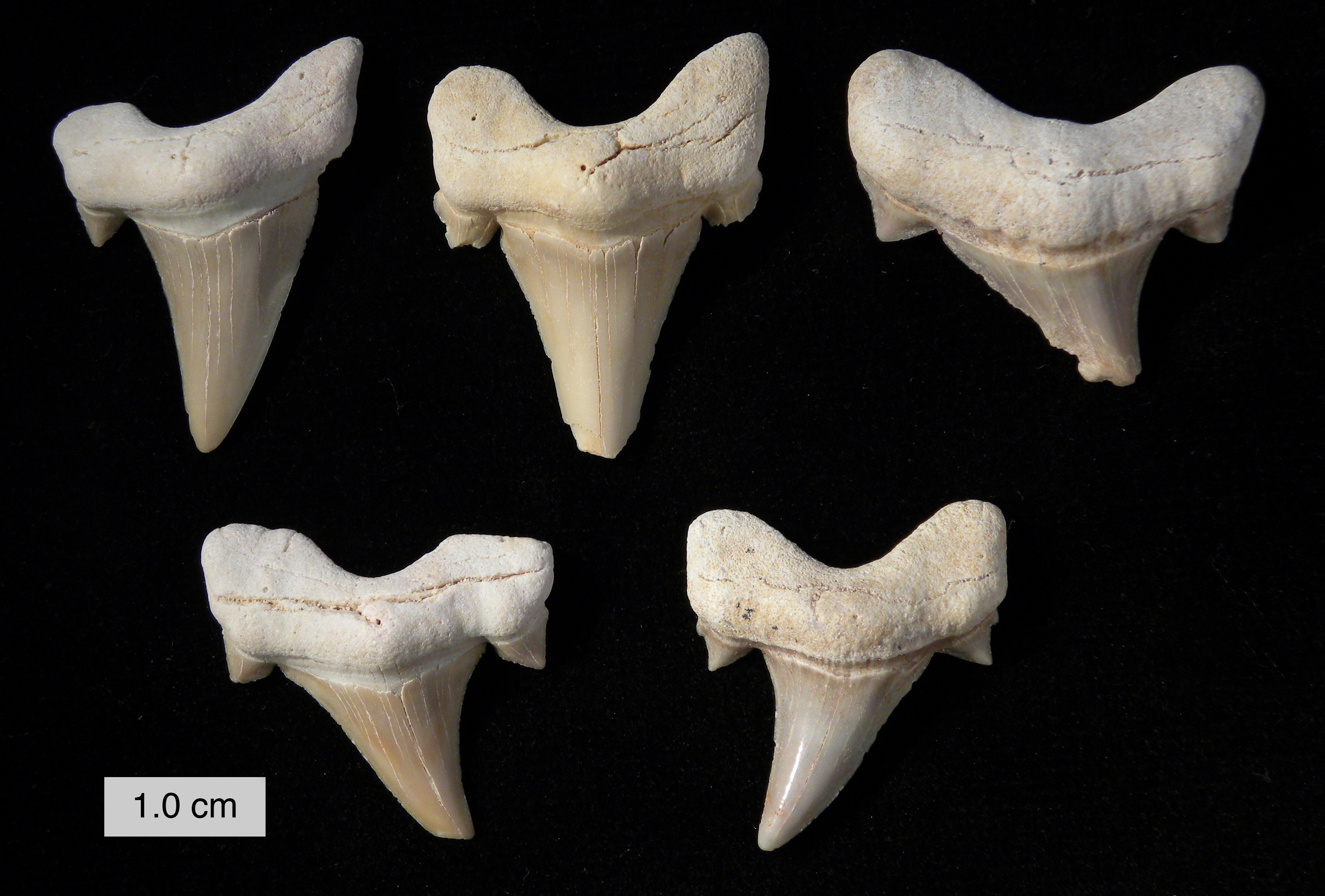
- Fossilized teeth of the Paleocene–Miocene shark Otodus
  †Otodus
  - †Otodus angustidens
  - †Otodus aruiculatus
- Otus
  - †Otus asio

== P ==
- †Palaeolama
  - †Palaeolama mirifica
- †Palaeophis
  - †Palaeophis africanus
- †Palaeorhncodon
- Paludestrina
  - †Paludestrina plana
- Panopea
  - †Panopea alabama
- Panthera
  - †Panthera onca
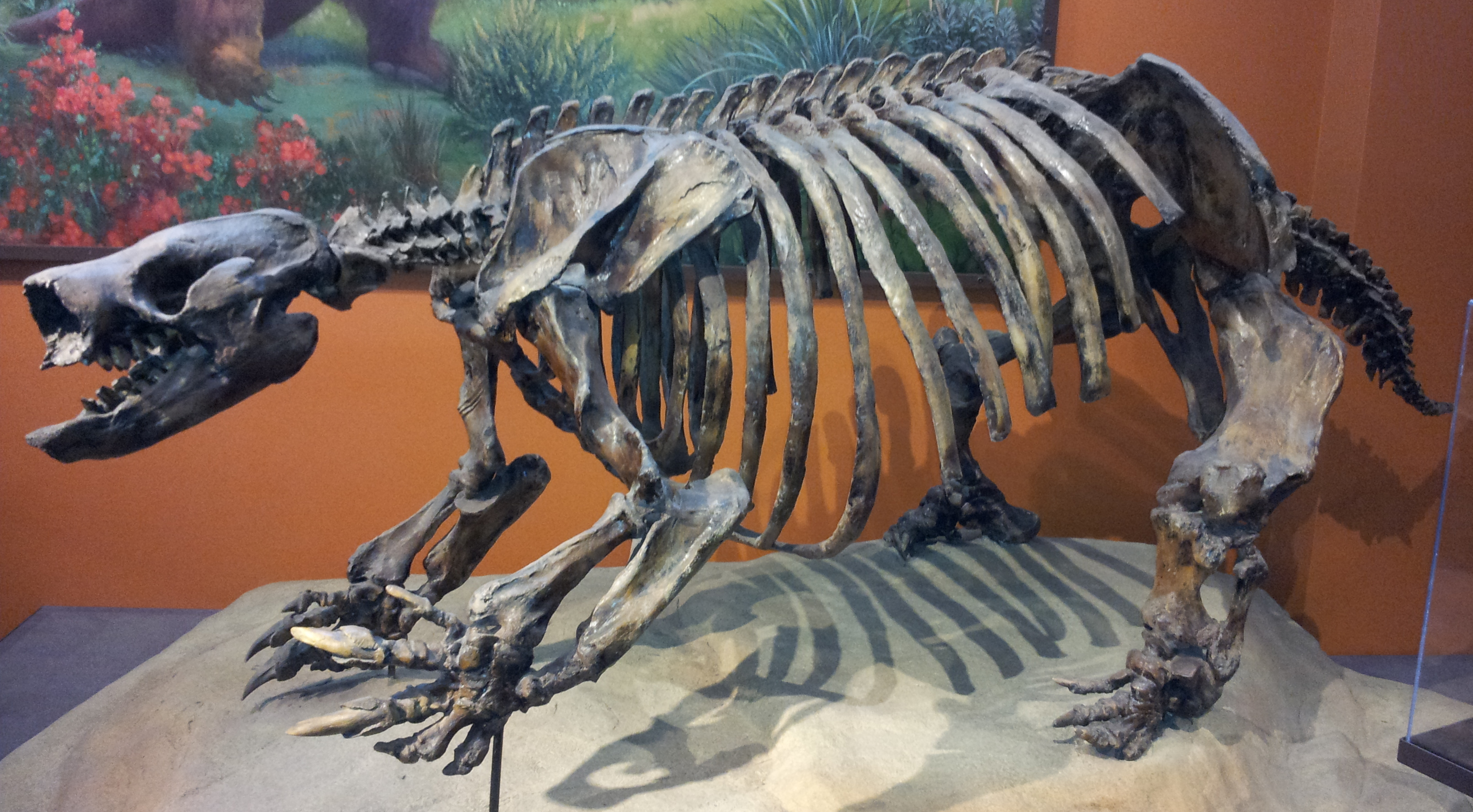
- Fossilized skeleton of the Pliocene-Pleistocene ground sloth Paramylodon
  †Paramylodon
  - †Paramylodon harlani
- †Pastinacea
- Pecten
  - †Pecten alpha
  - †Pecten perplanus
- Pekania
  - †Pekania pennanti
- †Periarchus
  - †Periarchus floridanus
  - †Periarchus lyelli
- Perigastrella
  - †Perigastrella elegans
- Periglypta
  - †Periglypta caesarina – or unidentified related form
- Peromyscus
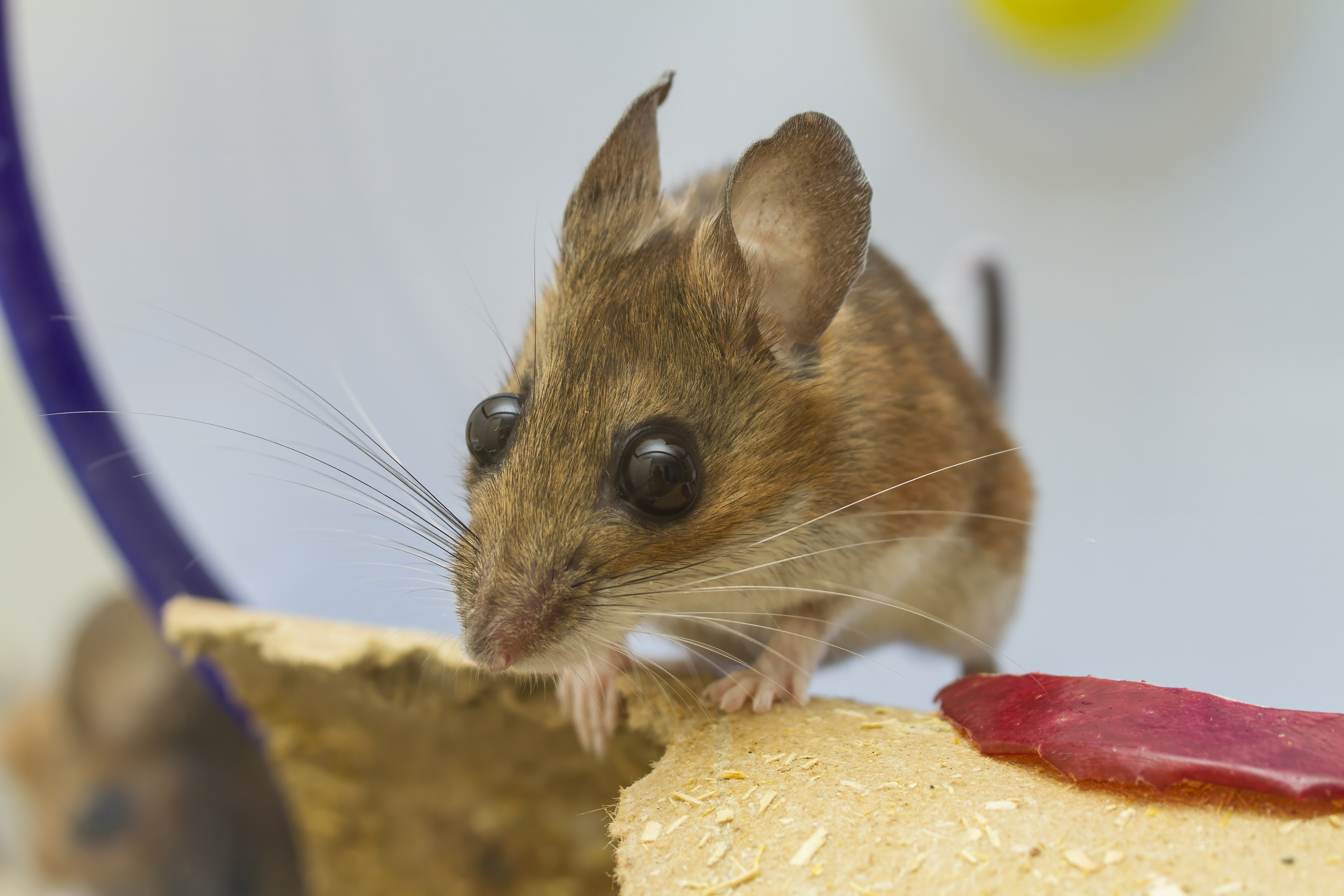
  - A living Peromyscus leucopus, or white-footed mouse
    †Peromyscus leucopus – or unidentified comparable form
  - †Peromyscus maniculatus – or unidentified comparable form
  - †Peromyscus polionotus – or unidentified comparable form
- Persicula
  - †Persicula progravida – type locality for species
- Persististrombus
  - †Persististrombus chipolanus
- Petricola
  - †Petricola pholadiformis
- Phacoides
  - †Phacoides perovatus
  - †Phacoides wacissanus – or unidentified comparable form
- Phyllodus
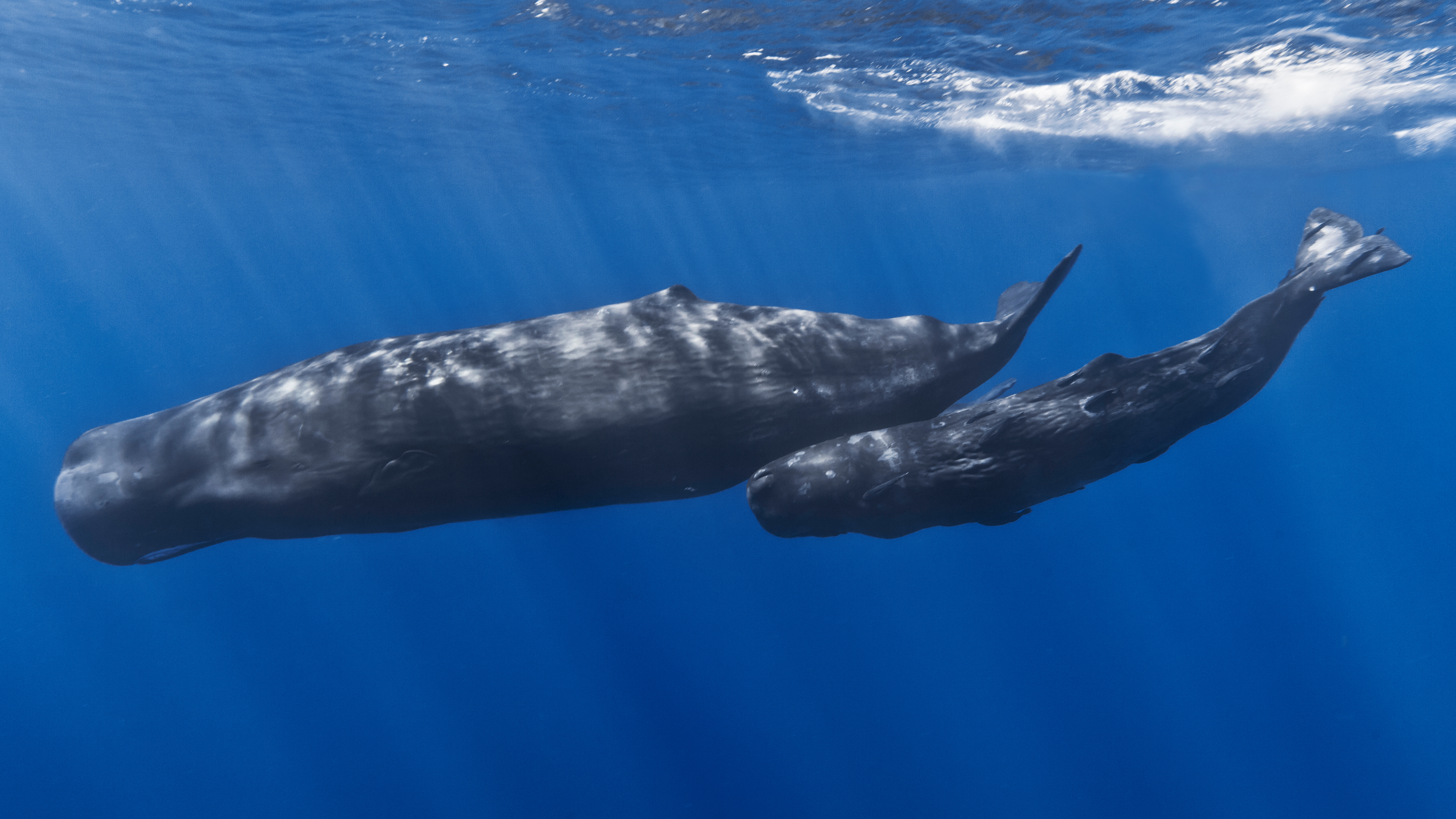
- A living Physeter macrocephalus, or sperm whale
  Physeter
  - †Physeter vetus – tentative report
- †Physeterula
  - †Physeterula neolassicus – tentative report
- †Physogaleus
  - †Physogaleus secundus
- Pica
  - †Pica pica
- Picoides
  - †Picoides villosus
- †Pipilio
  - †Pipilio erythrophthalamus
- Pipistrellus
  - †Pipistrellus subflavus – or unidentified comparable form
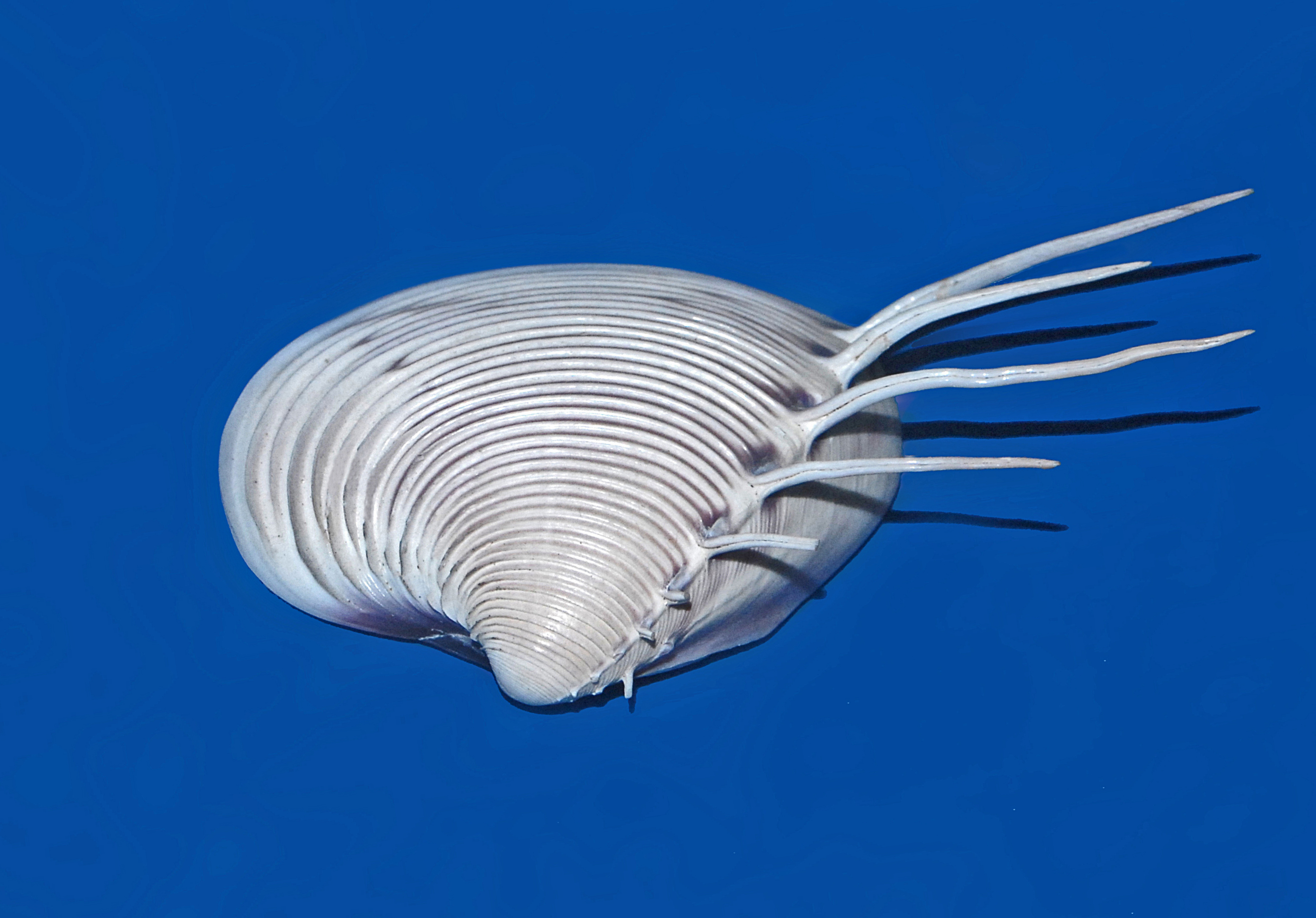
- Shell of a Pitar venus clam
  Pitar
  - †Pitar macbeani
  - †Pitar nuttalliopsis
  - †Pitar trigoniata
- Pituophis
  - †Pituophis melanoleucas
- Placopecten
  - †Placopecten magellanicus
- †Plagiosmittia
  - †Plagiosmittia porelloides
- Planorbis
  - †Planorbis antiquatus
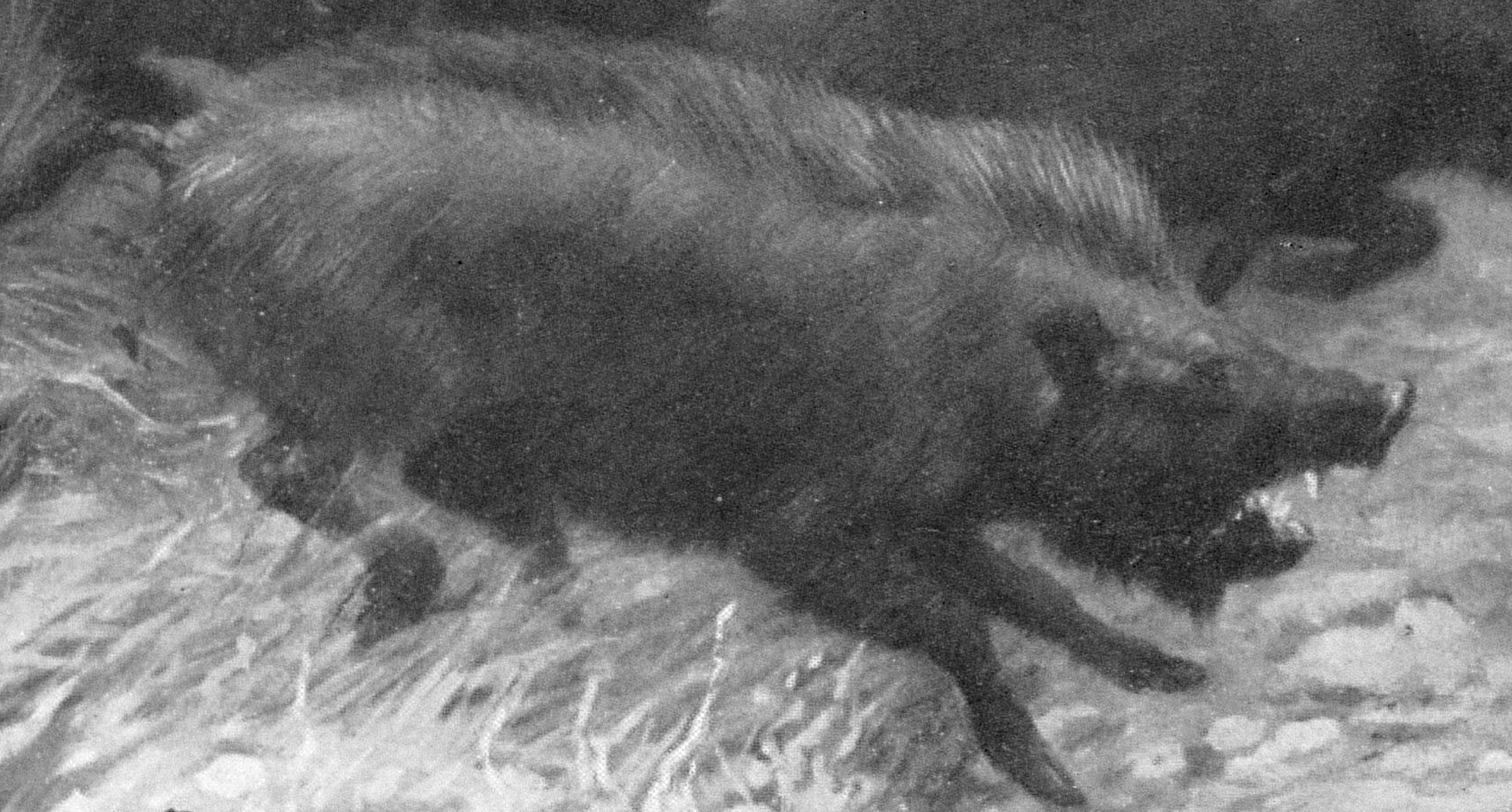
- Restoration of a herd of alarmed Miocene-Pleistocene peccaries of the genus Platygonus. Charles R. Knight (1922).
  †Platygonus
  - †Platygonus compressus – or unidentified comparable form
- Plethodon
  - †Plethodon glutinosus – or unidentified comparable form
- Pleuromeris
  - †Pleuromeris tridentata
- Plicatula
- Podilymbus
  - †Podilymbus podiceps
- Pogonias
  - †Pogonias cromis
- †Pontosphaera
- †Potamides
  - †Potamides cancelloides
  - †Potamides saltillensis
- Prionocidaris – tentative report
- Prionotus
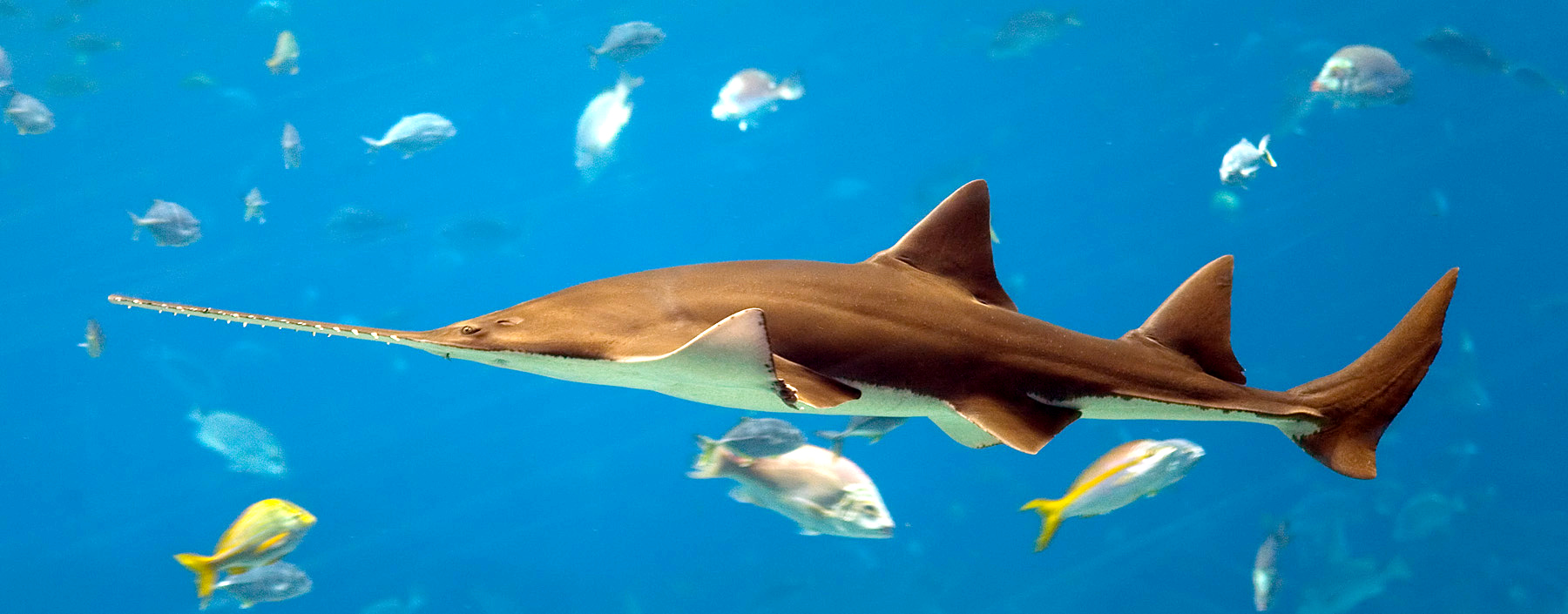
- A living Pristis sawfish
  Pristis
  - †Pristis lathami
  - †Pristis pickeringi – type locality for species
- Procyon
  - †Procyon lotor
- †Propristis
  - †Propristis schweinfurthi
- Pseudacris
  - †Pseudacris ornata
- Pseudemys
  - †Pseudemys concinna – or unidentified comparable form
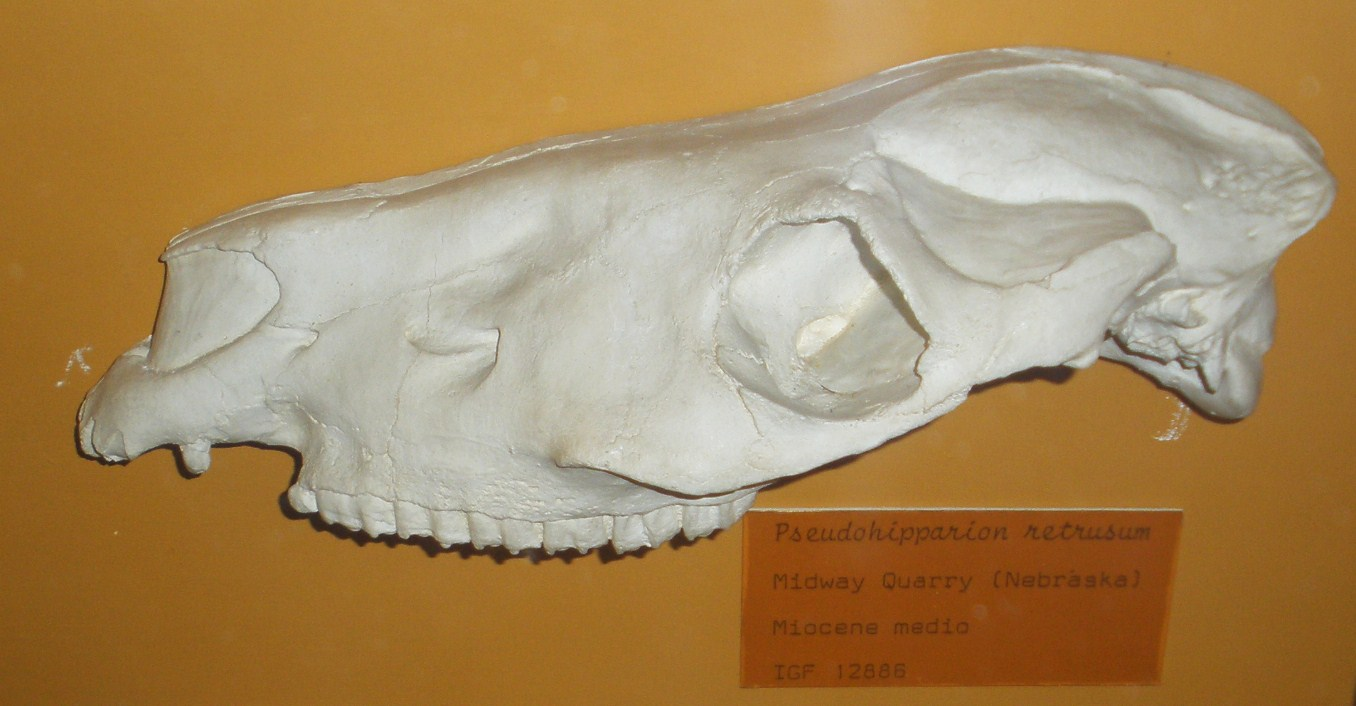
- Replica of a fossilized cranium of the Miocene horse Pseudhipparion
  †Pseudhipparion
  - †Pseudhipparion simpsoni – or unidentified comparable form
- Pseudomiltha
  - †Pseudomiltha ocalanus
- Pseudotriton
  - †Pseudotriton ruber
- †Psilocochlis
  - †Psilocochlis mccalliei
- Pteria – report made of unidentified related form or using admittedly obsolete nomenclature
  - †Pteria argentea – or unidentified comparable form
- †Pteropsella
  - †Pteropsella lapidosa
- †Pterosphenus
  - †Pterosphenus schucherti
- Pterynotus
  - †Pterynotus rufirupicolus
- Puma
  - †Puma concolor
- †Pyrazisinus
  - †Pyrazisinus campanulatus
  - †Pyrazisinus cornutus

== Q ==
- Quercus

== R ==
- Raja
- †Rana
  - †Rana catesbiana – lapsus calami of Rana catesbeiana
  - †Rana pipiens
- Rangia
  - †Rangia cuneata
- Rangifer
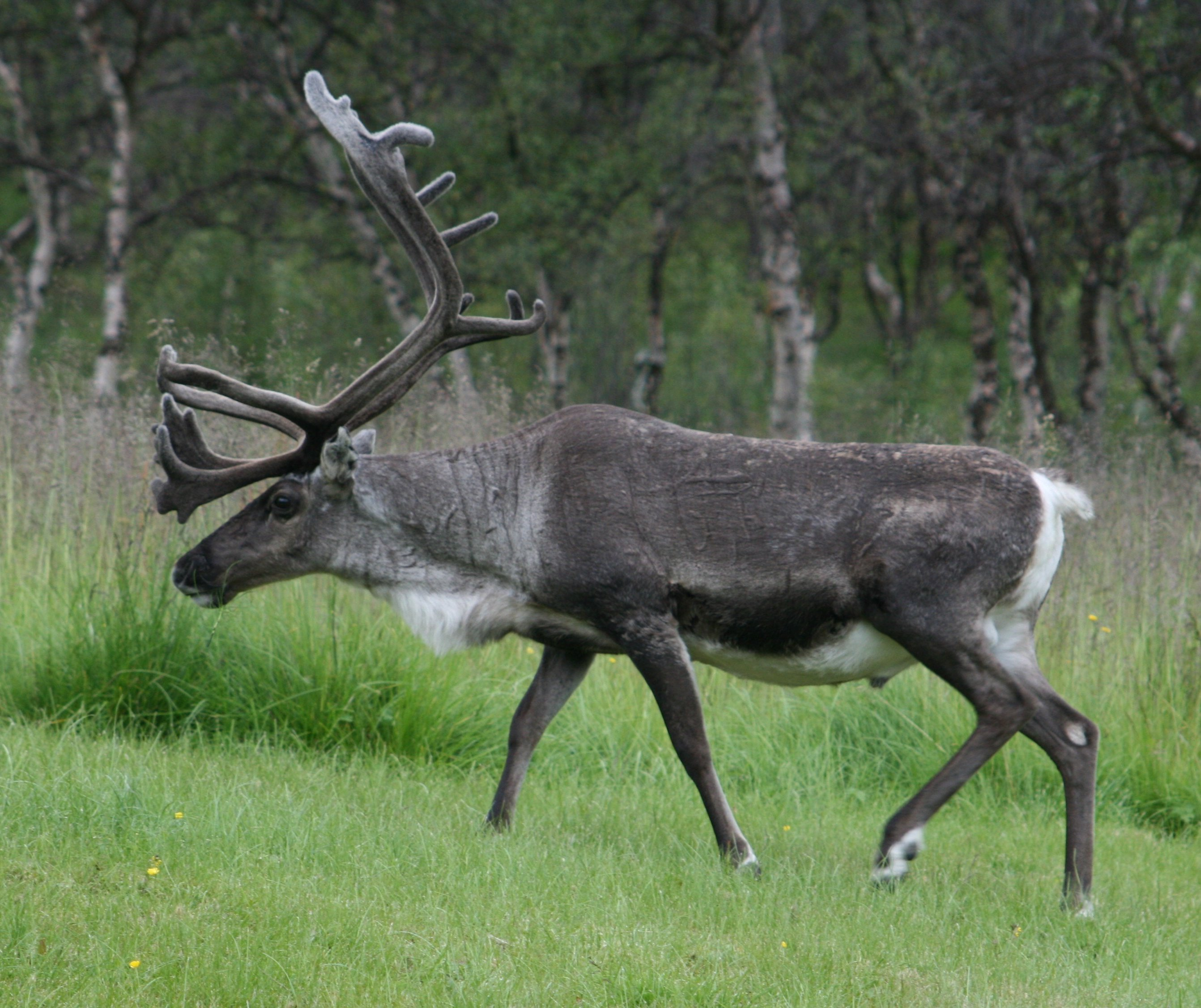
  - A living Rangifer tarandus, or reindeer
    †Rangifer tarandus
- Rapana
  - †Rapana vaughani
- †Regina
- Reticulofenestra
  - †Reticulofenestra samodurovii
  - †Reticulofenestra umbilica
- †Rhabdosphaera
- Rhinobatos
  - †Rhinobatos casieri – or unidentified comparable form
- Rhinoptera
- Rhizoprionodon
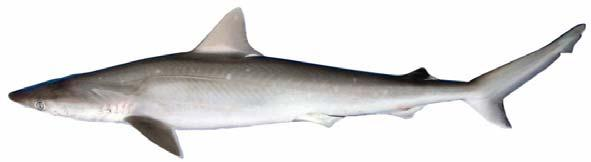
  - A living Rhizoprionodon terraenovae, or Atlantic sharpnose shark
    †Rhizoprionodon terraenovae
- †Rhopostoma
  - †Rhopostoma cruciferum
- Rhyncholampas
  - †Rhyncholampas ericsoni
  - †Rhyncholampas gouldii
- †Rimosocella
  - †Rimosocella laciniosa
- †Ringicardium
  - †Ringicardium harrisi

== S ==
- Sayornis
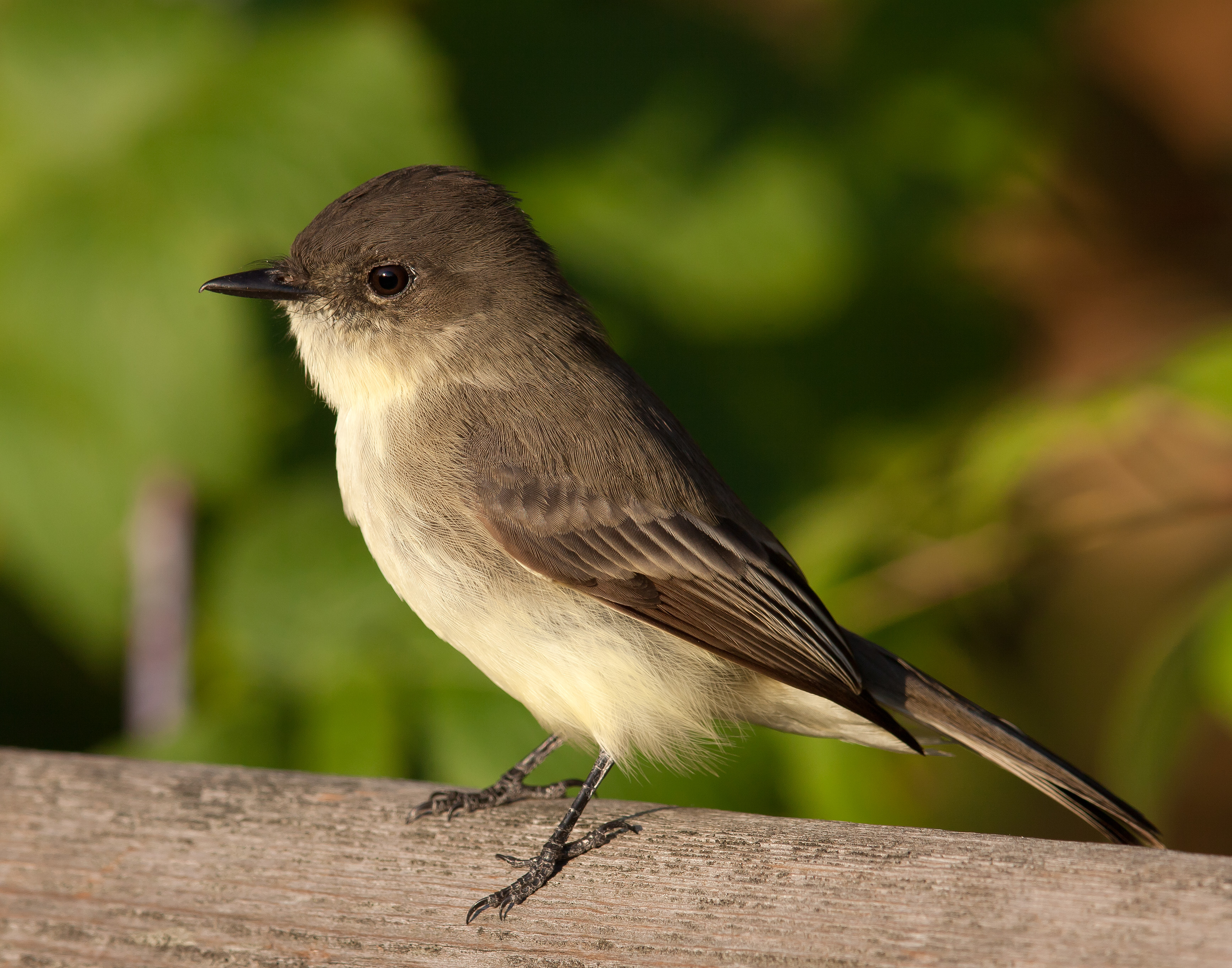
  - A living Phoebe
    †Sayornis phoebe
- Scalopus
  - †Scalopus aquaticus
- Sceloporus
  - †Sceloporus undulatus
- Schizaster
  - †Schizaster americanus
  - †Schizaster armiger
- Schizomavella
  - †Schizomavella porosa
- Schizoporella
  - †Schizoporella mcbeanensis – type locality for species
- †Schizorthosecos
  - †Schizorthosecos interstitia
- †Scianops
  - †Scianops ocellata
- Sciuropterus
  - †Sciuropterus volans
- Sciurus
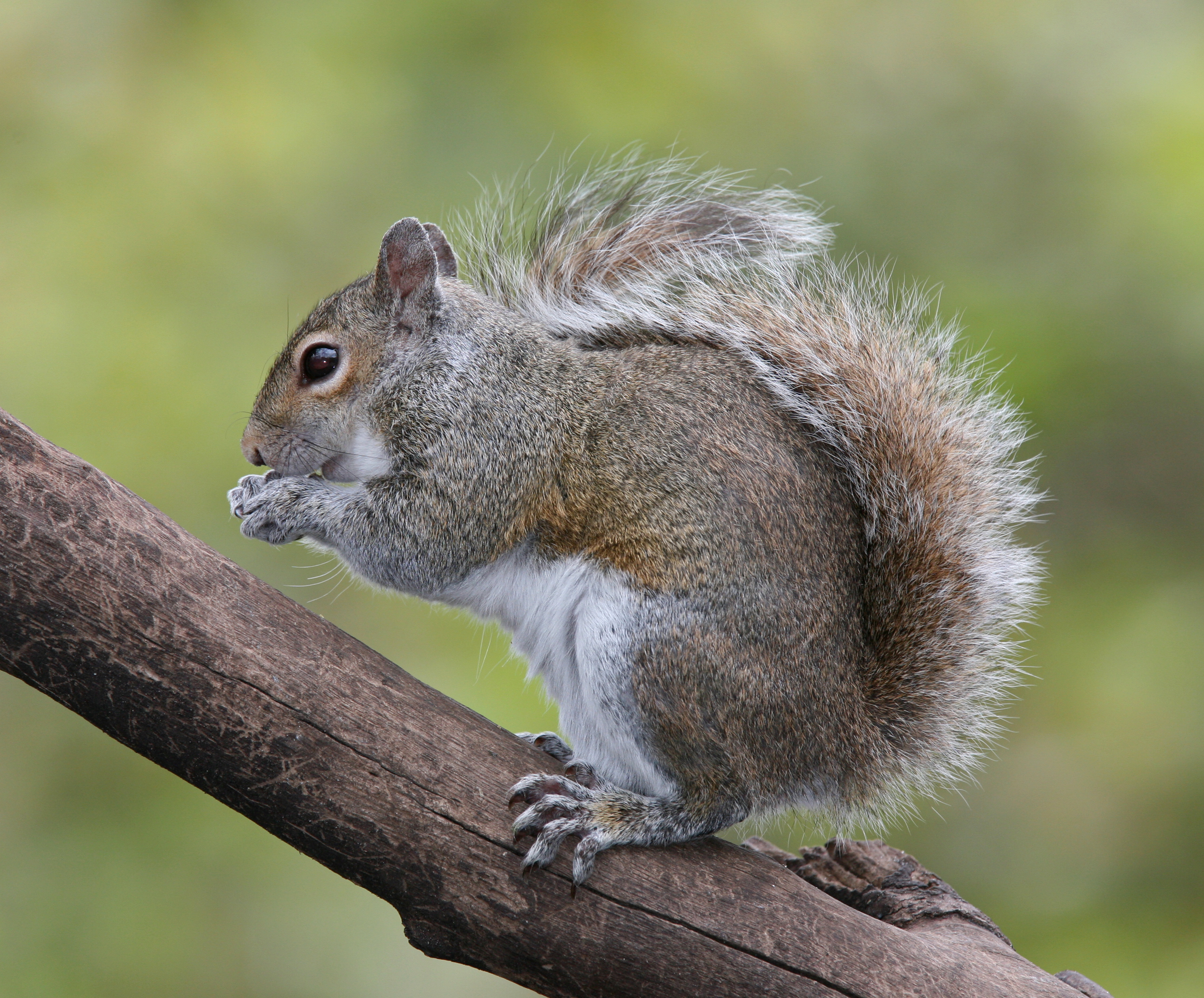
  - A living Sciurus carolinensis, or eastern gray squirrel
    †Sciurus carolinensis
- †Scoliodon
  - †Scoliodon terraenovae
- Scolopax
  - †Scolopax minor
- Scyliorhinus
  - †Scyliorhinus distans
  - †Scyliorhinus enniskilleni
  - †Scyliorhinus gilberti
- Semele – tentative report
- Semihaswellia
  - †Semihaswellia rectifurcata
- Siderastrea
  - †Siderastrea silecensis
- Sigmodon
  - †Sigmodon hispidus
- Sinum
  - †Sinum imperforatum
- Siren
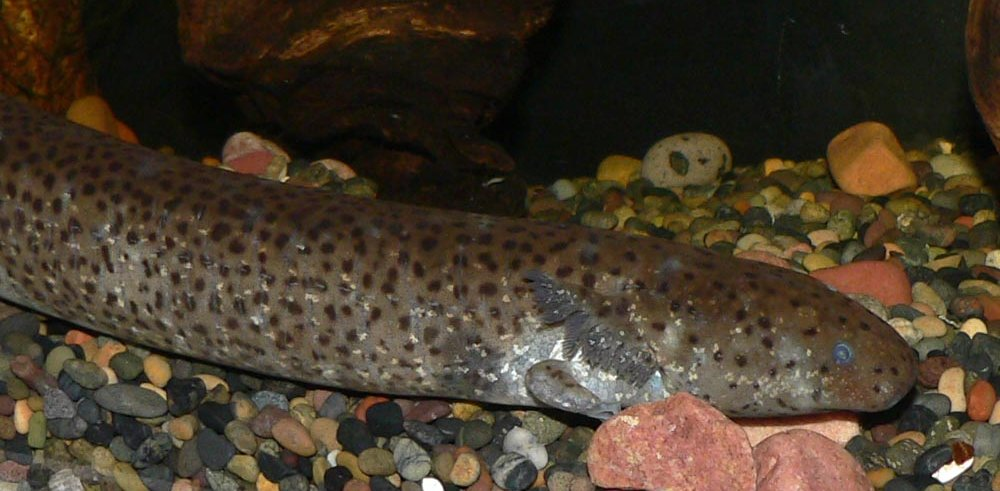
  - Close-up portrait of a Siren intermedia, or lesser siren
    †Siren intermedia – or unidentified comparable form
- Smittina
  - †Smittina denticulifera
  - †Smittina portentosa
- Solemya
  - †Solemya alabamensis
- Solena
  - †Solena lisbonensis
- Sorex
  - †Sorex cinereus
  - †Sorex fumeus
- Sphenolithus
  - †Sphenolithus moriformis
  - †Sphenolithus spiniger
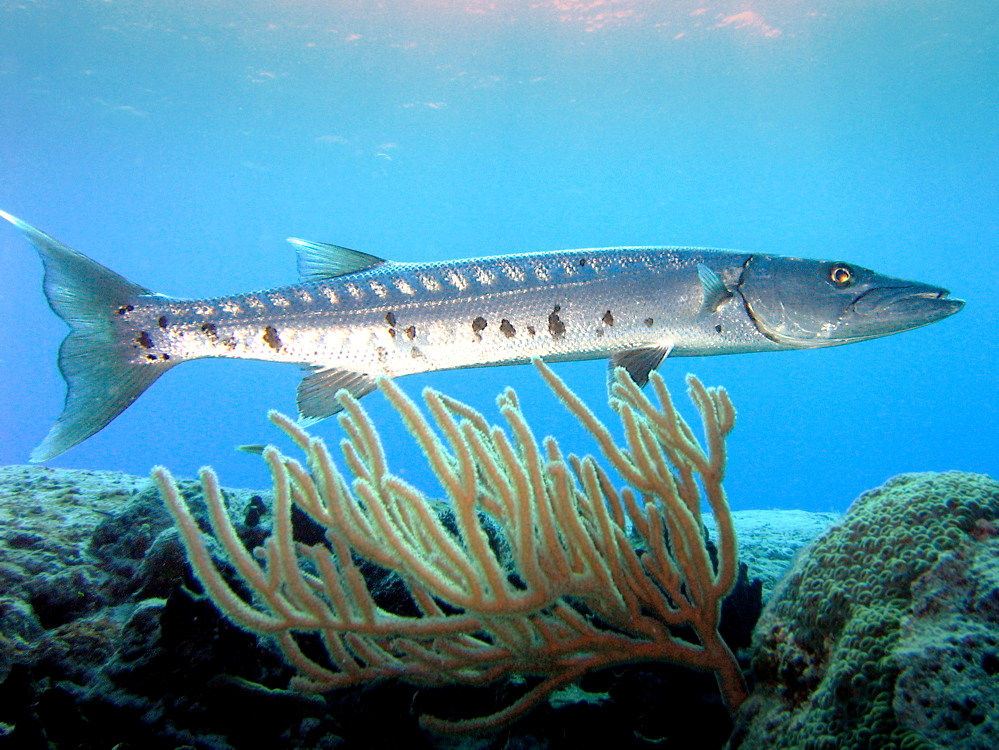
- A living Sphyraena, or barracuda
  Sphyraena
- Sphyrna
  - †Sphyrna tiburo
  - †Sphyrna zygaena
- Spilogale
  - †Spilogale putorius
- Spisula
  - †Spisula praetenuis – or unidentified comparable form
- Spizella
  - †Spizella passerina
- Spondylus
  - †Spondylus filiaris
- Squatina
  - †Squatina prima
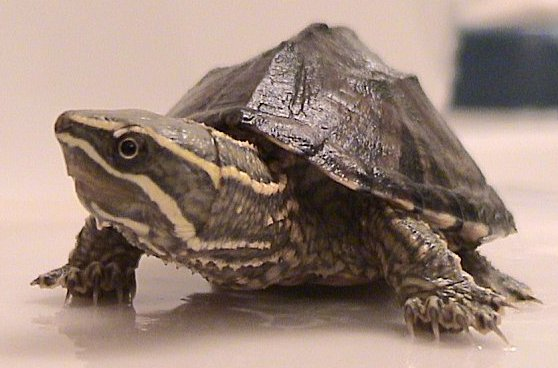
- A living Sternotherus, or musk turtle
  Sternotherus
- †Striatolamia
  - †Striatolamia macrota
- Strigilla
  - †Strigilla georgiana – type locality for species
- †Striostrea
  - †Striostrea gigantissima
- Strioterebrum
  - †Strioterebrum dislocatum
- Strombus
- †Stylocoenia
  - †Stylocoenia pumpellyi
- Stylophora
  - †Stylophora minutissima
  - †Stylophora silicensis – type locality for species
- Sylvilagus
  - †Sylvilagus floridanus
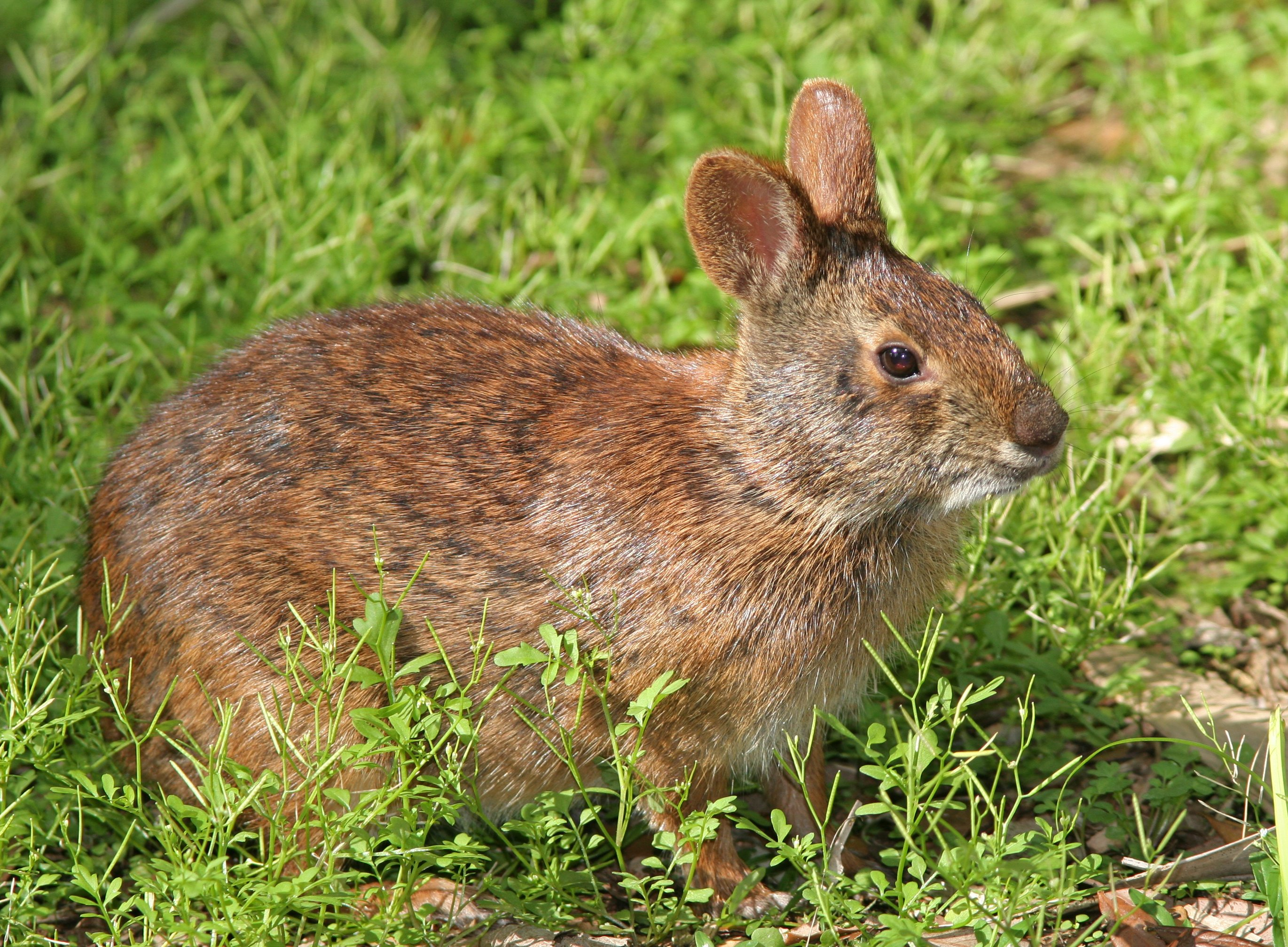
  - A living Sylvilagus palustris, or marsh rabbit
    †Sylvilagus palustris
  - †Sylvilagus transitionalis
- Synaptomys
  - †Synaptomys australis
  - †Synaptomys cooperi
- Synodus

== T ==
- Tamias – type locality for genus
  - †Tamias aristus – type locality for species
- Tapirus
  - †Tapirus haysii
  - †Tapirus veroensis
- Taxodium
- Teinostoma
  - †Teinostoma sublimata
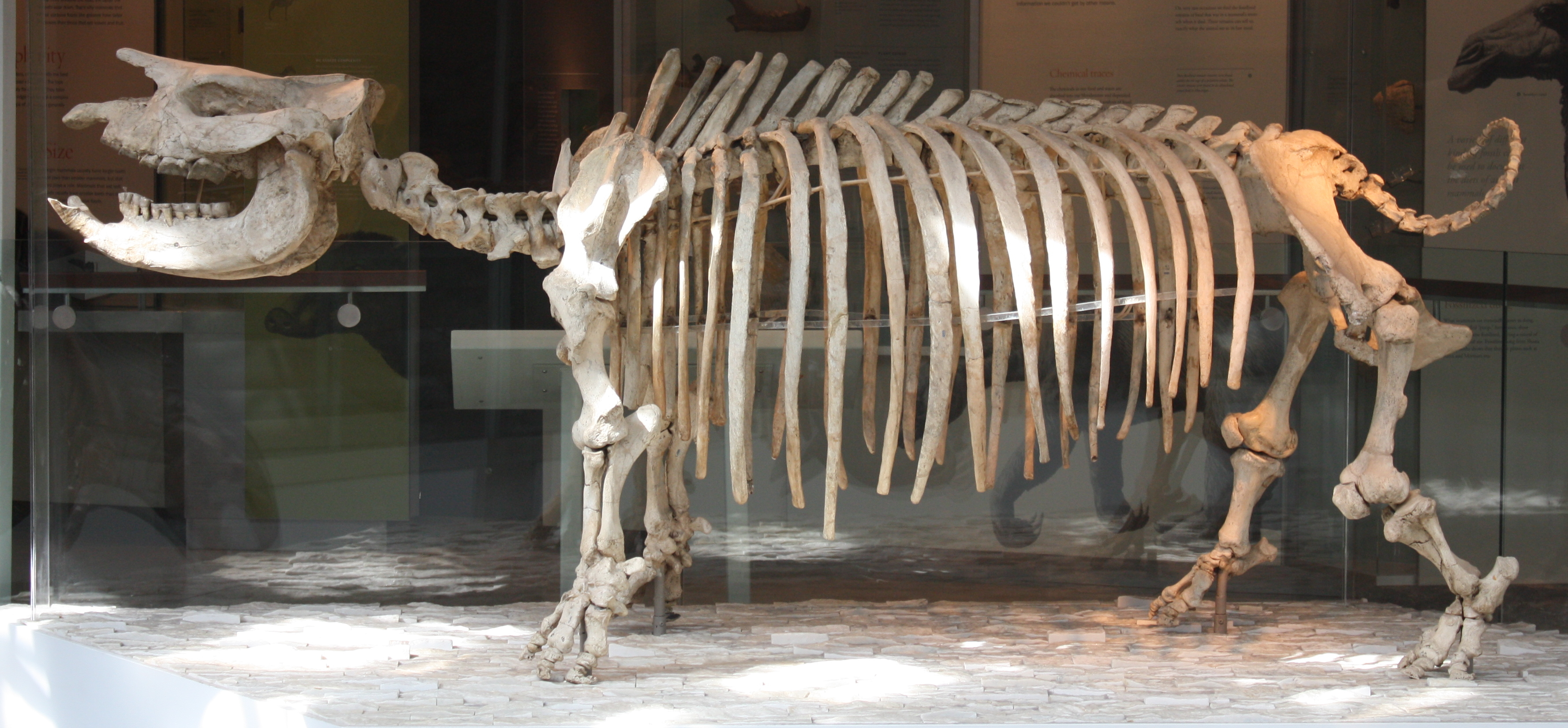
- Mounted fossilized skeleton of the Miocene-Pliocene rhinoceros Teleoceras
  †Teleoceras
- Tellina
  - †Tellina segregata
- Terebratulina
  - †Terebratulina brundidgensis
- Teredo
- Terrapene
  - †Terrapene carolina
- Thamnophis
  - †Thamnophis sirtalis
- Trachemys
  - †Trachemys scripta
- Trachycardium
  - †Trachycardium eversum
- Trachyphyllia – tentative report
- †Transversopontis
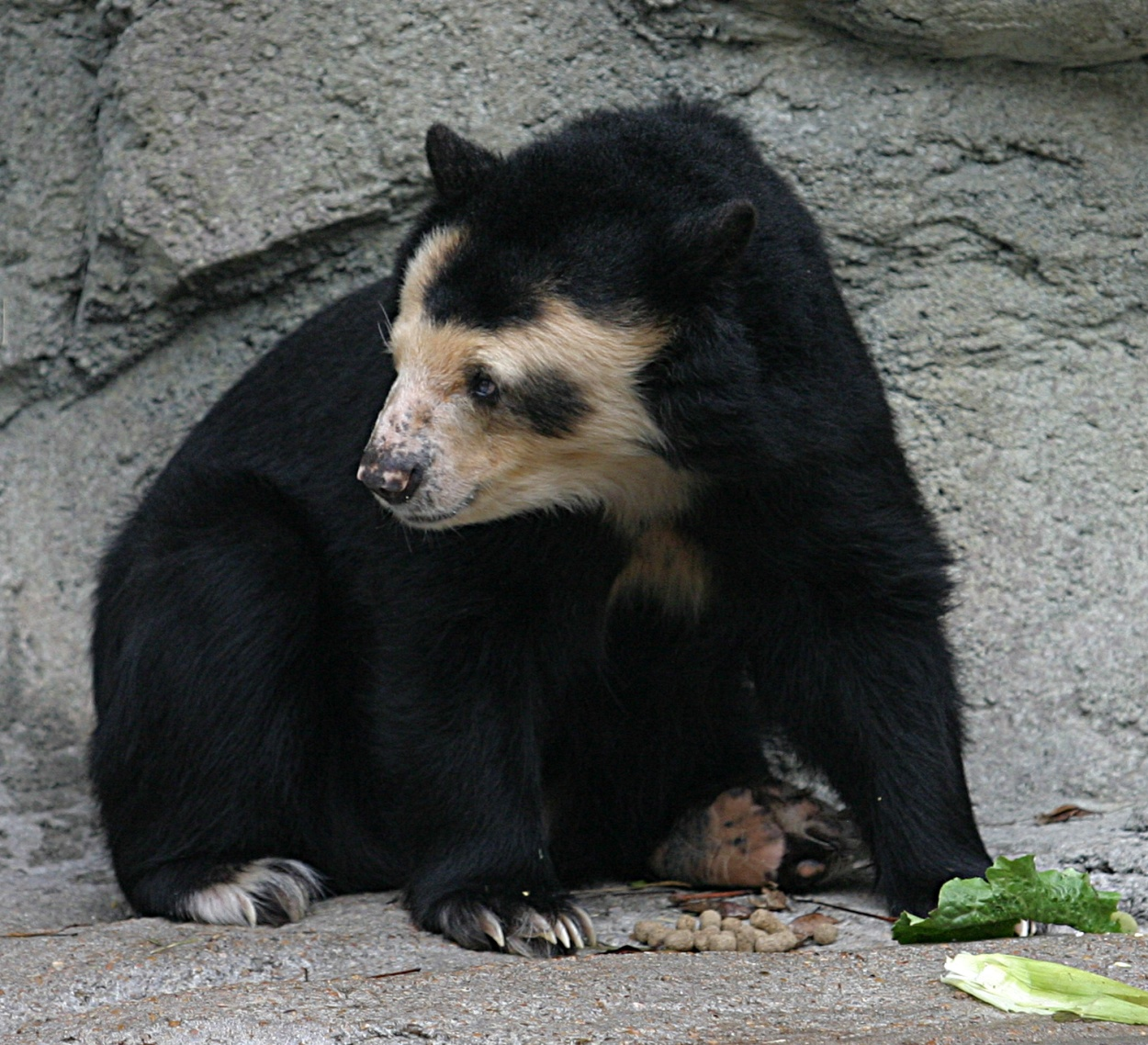
- A living Tremarctos, or spectacled bear
  Tremarctos
  - †Tremarctos floridanus
- †Triaenodon
- †Trichiuris
- Trichiurus
- Trochita
  - †Trochita aperta
- Trochocyathus – tentative report
- †Truncorotaloides
  - †Truncorotaloides rohri
  - †Truncorotaloides topiensis – or unidentified comparable form
- Turris
- Turritella
  - †Turritella alcida
  - †Turritella aldrichi
  - †Turritella dalli
  - †Turritella halensis
  - †Turritella humerosa
  - †Turritella martinensis
  - †Turritella nasuta
  - †Turritella tampae
  - †Turritella tennesseensis
- Tympanuchus
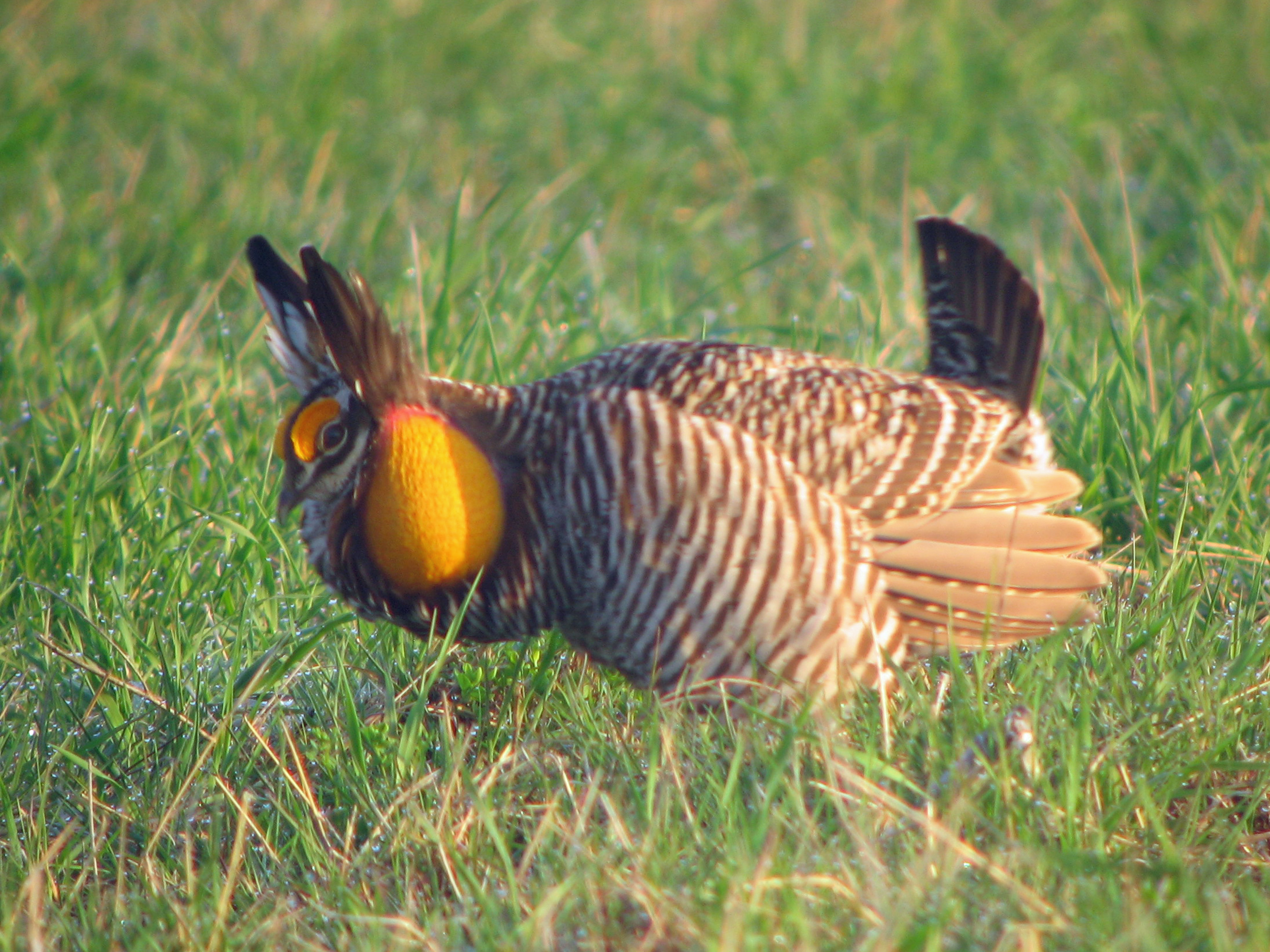
  - A living Tympanuchus cupido, or greater prairie chicken
    †Tympanuchus cupido

== U ==
- Ulmus
- Urocyon
  - †Urocyon cinereoargenteus
- Ursus
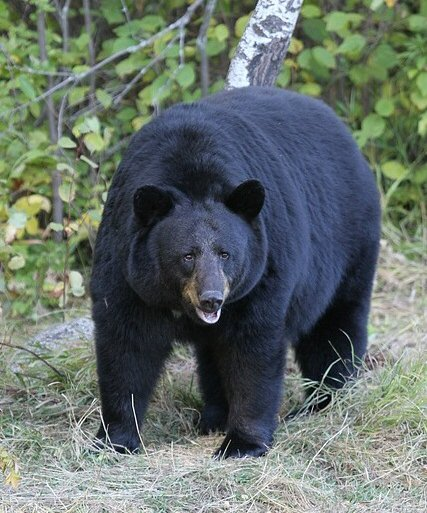
  - A living Ursus americanus, or American black bear
    †Ursus americanus

== V ==
- Venericardia
  - †Venericardia bashiplata
  - †Venericardia hatcheplata
  - †Venericardia horatiana
  - †Venericardia mediaplata
  - †Venericardia ocalaedes
  - †Venericardia praecisa
  - †Venericardia smithii
- †Volutilithes – or unidentified comparable form
  - †Volutilithes florencis

== X ==
- Xancus
  - †Xancus wilsoni
- Xenophora
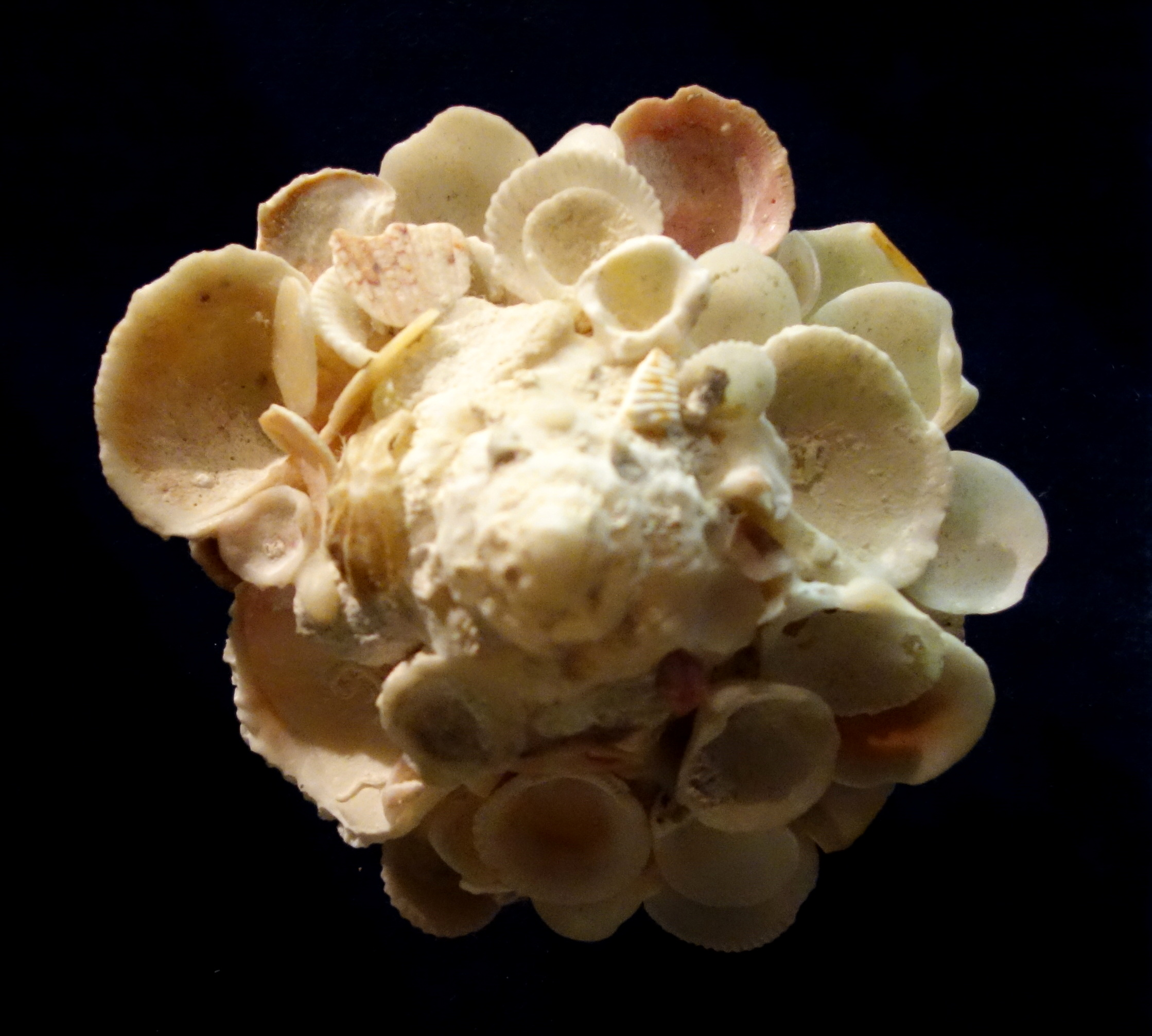
  - Shell of a Xenophora conchyliophora carrier shell sea snail
    †Xenophora conchyliophora

== Y ==
- Yoldia
  - †Yoldia semenoides

== Z ==
- Zapus
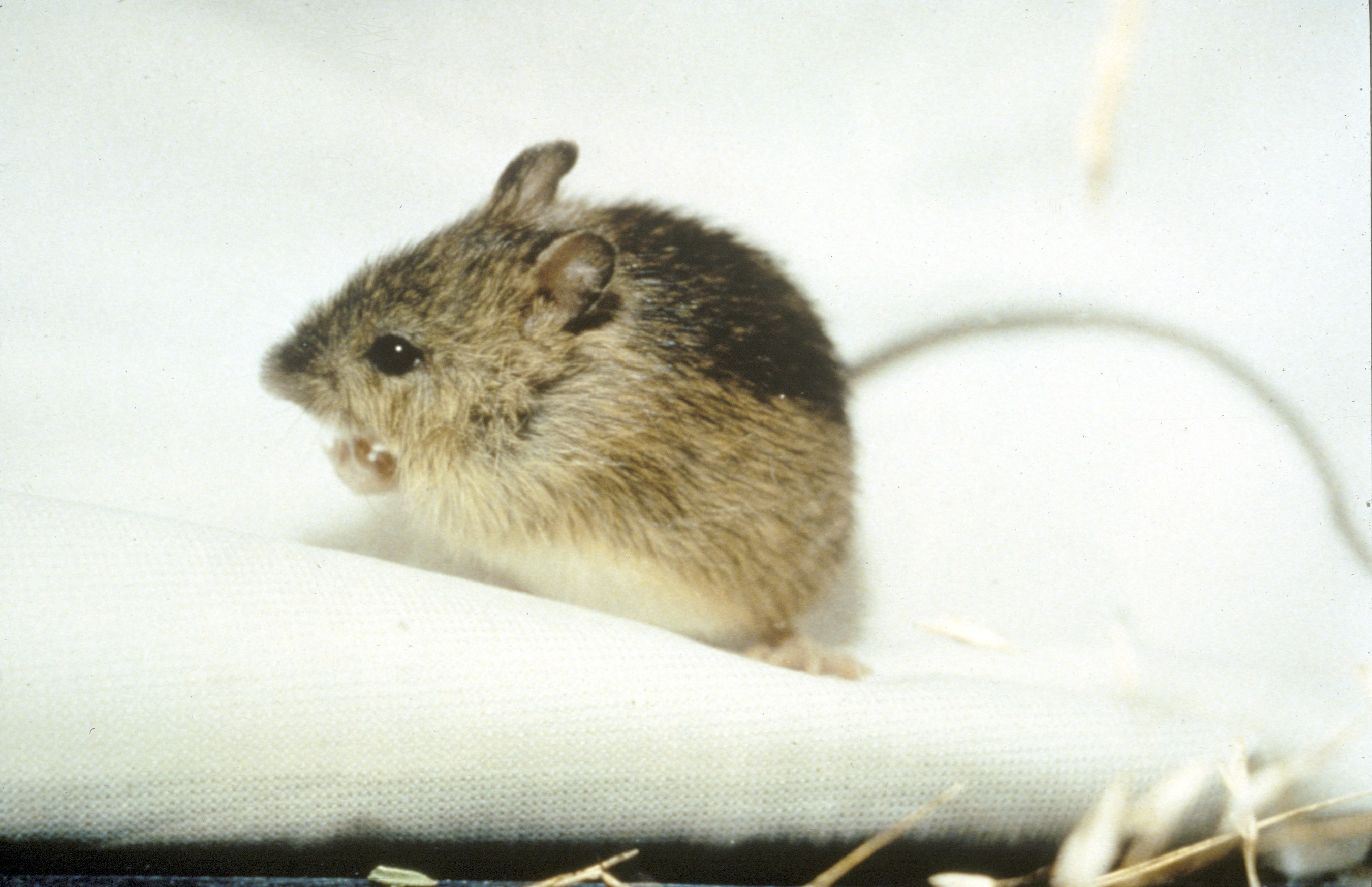
  - A living Zapus hudsonius, or meadow jumping mouse
    †Zapus hudsonius
- †Zygolithus
  - †Zygolithus dubius
- †Zygrhablithus
  - †Zygrhablithus bijugatus
