= Pregnancy in fish =

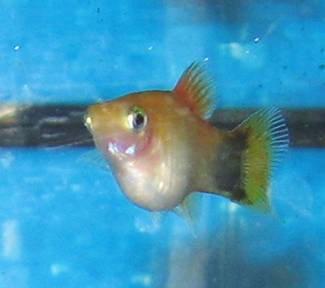
A pregnant Southern platyfish

Pregnancy has been traditionally defined as the period of time a creature's young are incubated in the body after the egg-sperm union. Although the term generally refers to placental mammals, it is also sometimes used in the context of fish, including in scientific literature. In fish the term can refer to a variety of modes where the developing young are retained by the parent, including both internally and externally, and with varying degrees and methods of parental supplementation. It can also extend to the father as well, as in seahorses and pipefish it is the male that becomes pregnant.

== Types of reproduction and pregnancy ==
Birth of guppy fry

Five modes of reproduction can be differentiated in fish based on relations between the zygote(s) and parents:

- Ovuliparity: Fertilization of eggs is external; zygotes develop externally.
- Oviparity: Fertilization of eggs is internal; zygotes develop externally as eggs with large yolk.
- Ovoviviparity: Fertilization is internal; zygotes are retained in the female (or male) but without major trophic (feeding) interactions between zygote and parents (there may be minor interactions, such as maintenance of water and oxygen levels). The embryos depend upon their yolk for survival.

There are two types of viviparity among fish.

- Histotrophic ("tissue eating") viviparity: The zygotes develop in the female's oviducts, but she provides no direct nutrition. The embryos survive by eating her eggs or their unborn siblings.
- Hemotrophic ("blood eating") viviparity: The zygotes are retained within the female and are provided with nutrients by her, often through some form of placenta.

Diagram

- Fish reproduction types
  - Ovuliparity
  - Oviparity
  - Ovoviviparity
  - Viviparity
    - Histotrophic
      Histotrophic
    - Hemotrophic
      Hemotrophic

=== Ovoviviparous fish ===
Examples of ovoviviparous fish are many of the squaliform sharks, which include sand sharks, mackerel sharks, nurse sharks, requiem sharks, dog sharks and hammerheads, among others, and the lobe finned coelacanth. Some species of rockfish (Sebastes) and sculpins (Comephoridae) produce rather weak larvae with no egg membrane and are also, by definition, ovoviviparous. Ovoviviparity occurs in most live-bearing bony fishes (Poeciliidae).

=== Viviparous fish ===
Viviparous fish include the families Goodeidae, Anablepidae, Jenynsiidae, Poeciliidae, Embiotocidae, and some sharks (some species of the requiem sharks, Carcharinidae and the hammerheads, Sphyrnidae, among others). The halfbeaks, Hemiramphidae, are found in both marine and freshwaters and those species that are marine produce eggs with extended filaments that attach to floating or stationary debris, while those that are found in freshwater are viviparous with internal fertilization. The Bythitidae are also viviparous although one species, Dinematichthys ilucoeteoides, is reported to be ovoviviparous.

Aquarists commonly refer to ovoviviparous and viviparous fish as "livebearers". Examples include guppies, mollies, moonfish, platys, four-eyed fish, and swordtails. All of these varieties exhibit signs of their pregnancy before the live fry are born. As examples, the female swordtail and guppy will both give birth to anywhere from 20 to 100 live young after a gestation period of four to six weeks, and mollies will produce a brood of 20 to 60 live young after a gestation of six to 10 weeks.

== Nutrition during pregnancy ==
Other terms relating to pregnancy in fish relate to the differences in the mode and extent of support the female gives the developing offspring.

"Lecithotrophy" (yolk feeding) occurs when the mother provisions the oocyte with all the resources that it needs prior to fertilization, so the egg is independent of the mother. Many members of the fish family Poeciliidae are considered to be lecithotrophic, however, research is increasingly showing that others are matrotrophic.

"Aplacental viviparity" occurs when the female retains the embryos during the entire time of development but without any transfer of nutrients to the young. The yolk sac is the only source of nutrients for the developing embryo. There are at least two exceptions to this; some sharks gain nourishment by eating unfertilized eggs produced by the mother (oophagy or egg eating) or by eating their unborn siblings (intra-uterine cannibalism).

"Matrotrophy" (mother feeding) occurs when the embryo exhausts its yolk supply early in gestation and the mother provides additional nutrition. Post-fertilization transfer of nutrients has been reported in several species within the genera Gambusia and Poecilia, specifically, G. affinis, G. clarkhubbsi, G. holbrooki, G. gaigei, G. geiseri, G. nobilis, P. formosa, P. latipinna, and P. mexicana.

Viviparous fish have developed several ways of providing their offspring with nutrition. "Embryotrophic" or "histrotrophic" nutrition occurs by the production of nutritive fluid, uterine milk, by the uterine lining, which is absorbed directly by the developing embryo. "Hemotrophic" nutrition occurs through the passing of nutritive substances between blood vessels of the mother and embryo that are in close proximity, i.e. a placenta-like organ similar to that found in mammals.

== Comparison between species ==
There is considerable variation between species in the length of pregnancy. At least one group of fish has been named after its pregnancy characteristics. The surfperch, genus Embiotoca, is a saltwater fish with a gestation period of three to six months. This lengthy period of pregnancy gives the family its scientific name from the Greek "embios" meaning "persistent" and "tokos" meaning "birth".

The table below shows the gestation period and number of young born for some selected fish.

Species		Reproduction method	Gestation period (Days)	Number of young (Average)
Atlantic sharpnose shark	(Rhizoprionodon terraenovae)	Viviparous	300-330	4-6
Barbeled houndshark	(Leptocharias smithii)	Viviparous^{a}	>120	7
Blackspot shark	(Carcharhinus sealei)	Viviparous^{b}	270	1-2
Blue shark	(Prionace glauca)	Viviparous	270-366	4-135
Bonnethead shark	(Sphyrna tiburo)	Viviparous^{c}		4-12
Bull shark	(Carcharhinus leucas)	Viviparous	366	4-10
Butterfly goodeid	(Ameca splendens)	Viviparous	55-60	6-30
Caribbean sharpnose shark	(Rhizoprionodon porosus)	Viviparous		2-6
Daggernose shark	(Isogomphodon oxyrhynchus)	Viviparous	366	2-8
Lemon shark	(Negaprion brevirostris)	Viviparous	366	18 (max)
Oceanic whitetip shark	(Carcharhinus longimanus)	Viviparous	366	1-15
Dwarf seahorse	(Hippocampus zosterae)	Ovoviviparous	3-55	10
Sandbar shark	(Carcharhinus plumbeus)	Viviparous	366	8
Spadenose shark	(Scoliodon laticaudus)	Viviparous^{d}	150-180	6-18
Viviparous eelpout	(Zoarces viviparus)	Ovoviviparous	180	30-400
Basking shark	(Cetorhinus maximus)	Ovoviviparous	>366	unknown^{f}
Bat ray	(Myliobatis californica)	Ovoviviparous	270-366	2-10
Coelacanth	(g. Latimeria)	Ovoviviparous	>366	
Blue stingray	(Dasyatis chrysonota)	Ovoviviparous	270	1-5
Bluespotted stingray	(Neotrygon kuhlii)	Ovoviviparous	90-150	1-7
Carpet sharks	(f. Ginglymostomatidae)	Ovoviviparous	180	30-40
Knifetooth sawfish	(Anoxypristis cuspidata)	Ovoviviparous	150	6-23
Nurse shark	(Ginglymostoma cirratum),	Ovoviviparous	150	21-29
Sailfin molly	(Poecilia latipinna)	Ovoviviparous	21-28	10-140
Salmon shark	(Lamna ditropis)	Ovoviviparous	270	2-6
Sand tiger shark	(Carcharias taurus)	Ovoviviparous	270-366	2^{g}
School shark	(Galeorhinus galeus)	Ovoviviparous	366	28-38
Shortfin mako shark	(Isurus oxyrinchus)	Ovoviviparous	450-540	4-18
Spotted eagle ray	(Aetobatus narinari)	Ovoviviparous	366	4
Tiger shark	(Galeocerdo cuvier)	Ovoviviparous	430-480	10-80
Tawny nurse shark	(Nebrius ferrugineus)	Aplacental viviparity		1-2

- ^{a} Unlike any other shark, the yolk-sac placenta is globular or spherical.
- ^{b} At first, the embryos are sustained by a yolk sac, but later a placenta develops.
- ^{c} A bonnethead female produced a pup by parthenogenesis in 2001.
- ^{d} The spadenose shark has the most advanced form of placental viviparity known in fish, as measured by the complexity of the placental connection and the difference in weight between the egg and the newborn young.
- ^{e} The eelpout suckles its young embryos while still within their mother's body, making it the only fish species to suckle its offspring.
- ^{f} Only one pregnant female is known to have been caught; she was carrying six unborn young.
- ^{g} 1 per uterine horn

== Poeciliopsis ==
Members of the genus Poeciliopsis (amongst others) show variable reproductive life history adaptations. P. monacha can be considered to be lecithotrophic because the female does not really provide any resources for her offspring after fertilization. P. lucida shows an intermediate level of matrotrophy, meaning that to a certain extent, the offspring's metabolism can actually affect the mother's metabolism, allowing for increased nutrient exchange. P. prolifica is considered to be highly matrotrophic, and almost all of the nutrients and materials needed for foetal development are supplied to the oocyte after it has been fertilized. This level of matrotrophy allows Poeciliopsis to carry several broods at different stages of development, a phenomenon known as superfetation.

P. elongata, P. turneri and P. presidionis form another clade which could be considered an outgroup to the P. monacha, P.lucida, and P. prolifica clade. These three species are very highly matrotrophic – so much so that in 1947, C. L. Turner described the follicular cells of P. turneri as "pseudo-placenta, pseudo-chorion, and pseudo-allantois".

== Guppy ==
Guppies are highly prolific livebearers giving birth to between five and 30 fry, though under extreme circumstances, she may give birth to only one or two or over 100. The gestation period of a guppy is typically 21–30 days, but can vary considerably. The area where a pregnant guppy's abdomen meets the tail is sometimes called the "gravid patch", or "gravid spot". When pregnant, there is a slight discoloration that slowly darkens as the guppy progresses through pregnancy. The patch first has a yellowish tinge, then brown and become deep orange as the pregnancy develops. This patch is where the fertilized eggs are stored and grow. The darkening is actually the eyes of the developing baby guppies and the orange tinge is their jelly-like eggs.

== Elasmobranchs ==
The majority of elasmobranchs are viviparous and show a wide range of strategies to provide their offspring with nourishment and respiratory requirements. Some sharks simply retain their young in the dilated posterior segment of the oviduct. In its simplest form, the uterus does not provide any additional nutrients to the embryos. However, other elasmobranchs develop secretory uterine villi that produce histotroph, a nutrient which supplements the yolk stores of the oocyte. Uterine secretions are perhaps most advanced in the stingrays. Following depletion of the yolk, the uterine lining hypertrophies into secretory appendages termed "trophonemata". The process by which the uterine secretions (also known as uterine milk or histotroph) are produced resembles that of breast milk in mammals. Furthermore, the milk is rich in protein and lipid. As the embryo grows, vascularisation of the trophonemata enlarges to form sinusoids that project out to the surface to form a functional respiratory membrane. In lamnoid sharks, following yolk use, the embryos develop teeth and eat eggs and siblings within the uterus. There is usually one fetus per uterus and it grows to enormous proportions of up to 1.3 m in length. In placental sharks, the yolk sac is not withdrawn to become incorporated into the abdominal wall. Rather, it lengthens to form an umbilical cord and the yolk sac becomes modified into a functional epitheliochorial placenta.

== Male pregnancy ==
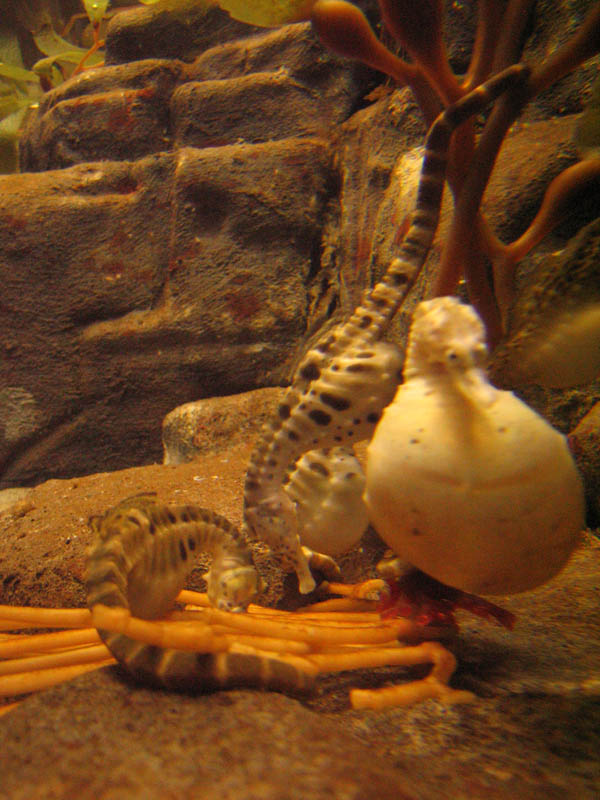
Pregnant male seahorse

The male fishes of seahorses, pipefishes, weedy, and leafy sea dragons (Syngnathidae) are unusual as the male, rather than the female, incubates the eggs before releasing live fry into the surrounding water. To achieve this, male seahorses protect eggs in a specialized brood pouch, male sea dragons attach their eggs to a specific area on their bodies, and male pipefish of different species may do either.

When a female's eggs reach maturity, she squirts them from a chamber in her trunk via her ovipositor into his brood pouch or egg pouch, sometimes called a "marsupium". During a mammalian pregnancy, the placenta allows the female to nourish her progeny in the womb, and remove their waste products. If male pipefish and seahorses provide only a simple pouch for fish eggs to develop and hatch, it might not fully qualify as bona-fide pregnancy. However, current research suggests that in syngnathid species with well developed brood pouches, males do provide nutrients, osmoregulation and oxygenation to the embryos they carry.

=== Seahorse ===
When mating, the female seahorse deposits up to 1,500 (average of 100 to 1,000) eggs in the male's pouch, located on the ventral abdomen at the base of the tail. Male juveniles develop pouches when they are 5–7 months old. The male carries the eggs for 9 to 45 days until the seahorses emerge fully developed, but very small. The number born maybe as few as five for smaller species, or 2,500 for larger species. A male seahorse's body has large amounts of prolactin, the same hormone that governs milk production in pregnant mammals and although the male seahorse does not supply milk, his pouch provides oxygen as well as a controlled-environment.

When the fry are ready to be born, the male expels them with muscular contractions, sometimes while attaching himself to seaweed with his tail. Birth typically occurs during the night, and a female returning for the routine morning greeting finds her mate ready for the next batch of eggs.

The table below shows the gestation period and number of young born for some selected seahorses.

Species		Reproduction method	Gestation period (Days)	Number of young
Big-belly seahorse	(Hippocampus abdominalis)	Ovoviviparous	28	600-700
Lined seahorse	(Hippocampus erectus)	Ovoviviparous	20-21	650 (max)
Long-snouted seahorse	(Hippocampus guttulatus)	Ovoviviparous	21	581 (max)

=== Pipefish ===
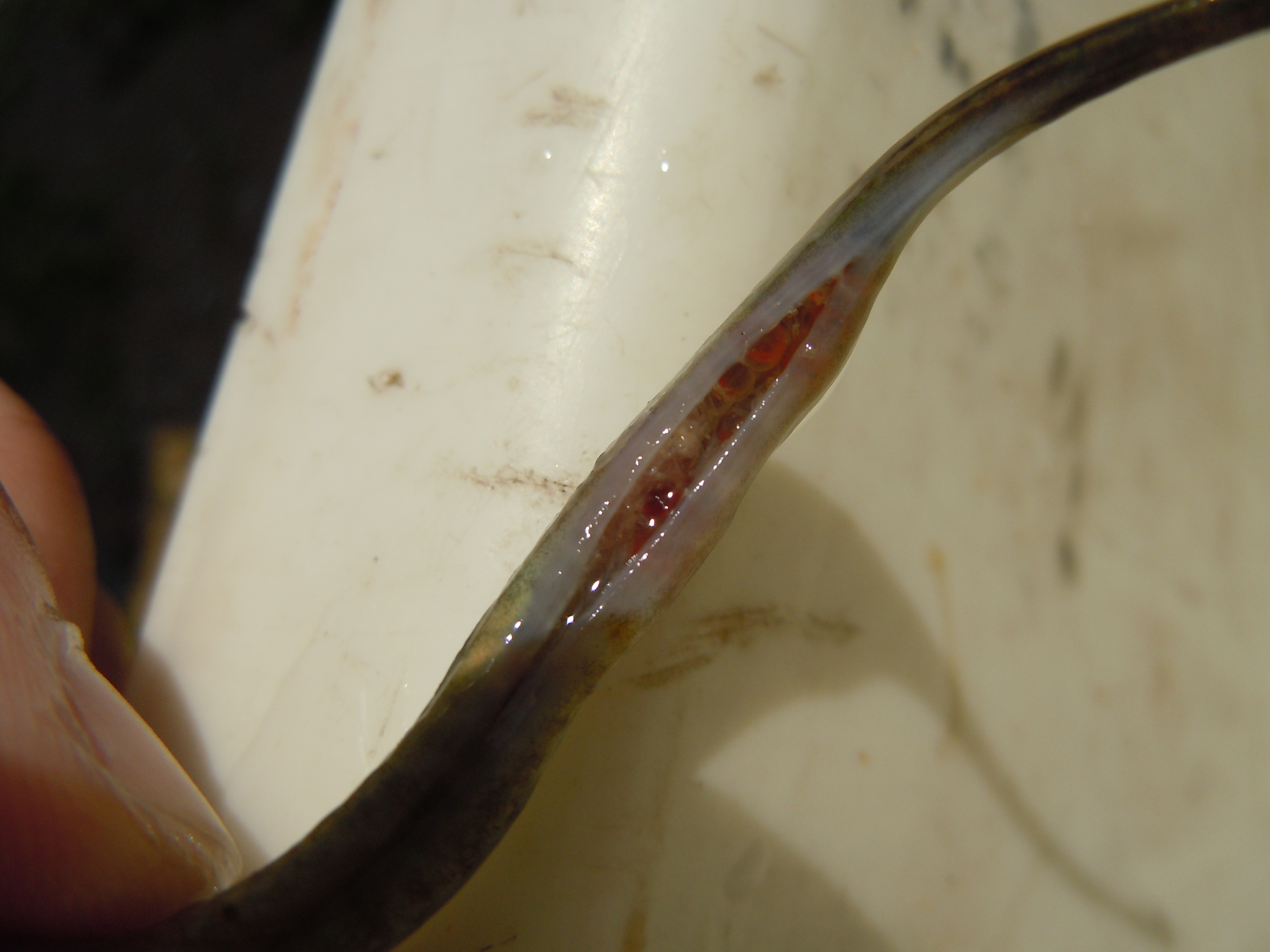
The subcaudal pouch of the male black-striped pipefish

Pipefish brood their offspring either on distinct region of its body or in a brood pouch. Brood pouches vary significantly among different species of pipefish, but all contain a small opening through which the female's eggs can be deposited. The location of the brood pouch can be along the entire underside of the pipefish or just at the base of the tail, as with seahorses. Pipefish in the genus Syngnathus have a brood pouch with a ventral seam that can completely cover all of their eggs when sealed. In males without these pouches, eggs adhere to a strip of soft skin on the ventral surface of their bodies that does not contain any exterior covering – a type of "skin brooding".

At least two species of pipefish, Syngnathus fuscus and Syngnathus floridae, provide nutrients for their offspring.

== See also ==
- Fish reproduction
