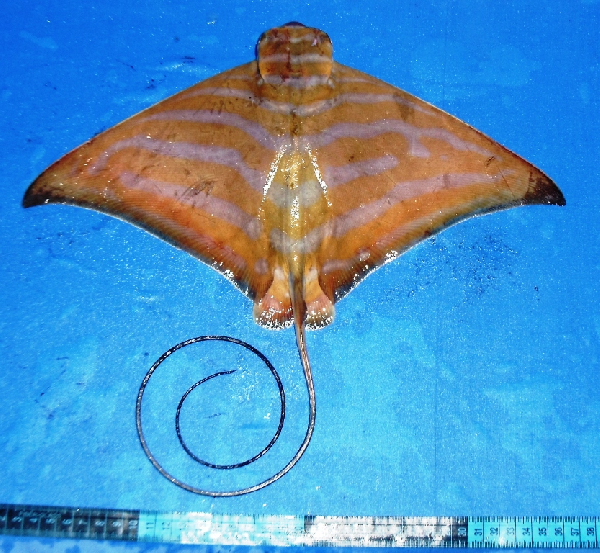

Conservation status
- Vulnerable (IUCN 3.1)

Scientific classification
- Kingdom: Animalia
- Phylum: Chordata
- Class: Chondrichthyes
- Subclass: Elasmobranchii
- Order: Myliobatiformes
- Family: Myliobatidae
- Genus: Aetomylaeus
- Species: A. nichofii

Binomial name
- Aetomylaeus nichofii (Bloch & J. G. Schneider, 1801)

= Banded eagle ray =

Species of fish

The banded eagle ray (Aetomylaeus nichofii) is a species of fish in the family Myliobatidae. The species was first described by Bloch and Schneider in 1801. As an elasmobranch, the banded eagle ray has a skeleton composed of cartilage. Like other eagle rays it has a depressiform, dorsoventrally flattened, shape to succeed in its benthic lifestyle. It preys mainly on benthic crustaceans, snails, and worms. Its natural habitats are open seas, shallow seas, and coral reefs. As of 2016, this species is classified as vulnerable by the IUCN. The main threats to the banded eagle ray are overfishing and habitat destruction.

== Description ==
Aetomylaeus nichofii is a relatively small eagle ray with a maximum disc width of 72 cm, but most organisms are between 35 and 55 cm. Like other members of Myliobatidae, this eagle ray is diamond-shaped with broad pectoral fins and a long tail. Gas exchange is facilitated by their dorsal spiracles, located behind their eyes, and their five ventral gill slits. The species has a greyish brown dorsal coloration with 7 to 8 faint blue transverse bands. As the individual matures, the bands become less distinct and can be difficult to detect in adults. Their ventral side is pale and whitish with dusky pectoral fins.

Their tail length is between 1.5 and 2 times the organism's disc width. The tail is characterized by faint blue banding with a greyish dorsal coloring and black ventral coloring. They have a small dorsal fin close to the pelvic fin insertion, near the base of the tail. This species has no caudal fin spine nor do they have any stinging apparutus, so they are not considered a stingray.

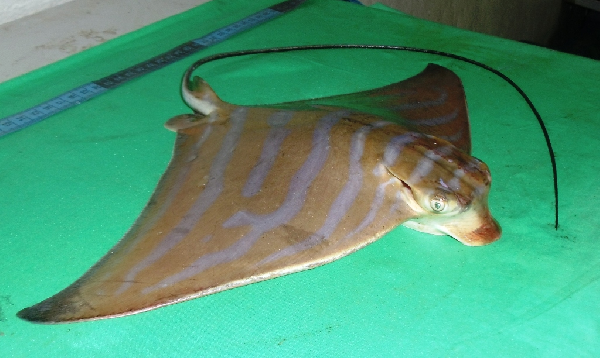
Frontal view of A. nichofii

They have tapered pectoral fins that are broad relative to the organism's size. Their pelvic fins are rounded and small relative to the pectoral fins. Their mouth contains 7 rows of molariform teeth in both the upper and lower jaw. Three smaller teeth rows run down each side of their jaw. The head is small and narrow with a fleshy and rounded rostral lobe. It protrudes forward and rises above the disc of the organism. Like other members of the genus Aetomylaeus, their pectoral fins are separated from the rostral lobe. The species has a long internasal flap with a fine fringe. Adult males have a small knob on the upper anterior margin.t

Intraspecific variation is common which can lead to difficulties in interspecific distinction. Aetomylaeus nichofii is often confused with A. caeruleofasciatus and A. wafckii. In general, A. nichofii has a shorter head and tail than A. caeruleofasciatus. In addition, molecular data strongly supports the distinction of A. caeruleofasciatus as a separate species from A. nichofii. A. wafickii has more transverse lines than A. nichofii (8-10 vs. 7-8 respectively), a lighter dorsal surface, and a shorter tail length, relative to organism size. Unlike in A. nichofii, the bands on A. wafickii do not become less distinct with age.

== Distribution ==
The banded eagle ray has a large distribution across the Indo-West Pacific. Historically it was estimated to occur from India to Papua New Guinea, north to Japan, and south to Northern Australia. The distinction of A. caeruleofasciatus, which appears in Northern Australia and Papua New Guinea, shrank the historic distribution of A. nichofii. The present distribution is now considered to be India to Indonesia and north to Japan (see Figure 3). There is also a fragmented population in the Persian Gulf. There has been sightings in Bangladesh, Bahrain, Brunei, Cambodia, China, India, Indonesia, Japan, North Korea, South Korea, Malaysia, Myanmar, Pakistan, the Philippines, Singapore, Sri Lanka, Taiwan, Thailand, Vietnam, possibly Maldives, and possibly Mozambique.

The banded eagle ray is a benthic fish that inhabits intertidal, nearshore waters, and coral reefs of tropical and temperate seas. This species is often found in tropical or temperate seas. It is amphidromous, found in both marine and brackish waters. It is often found in areas with sandy substrates, at depths of up to 115m. Wild specimens caught by the Queensland Museum Research team were found at depths ranging from 8-43m. A study done from 2006 to 2012 in Bangladesh found the species to be abundant year round, but sightings were on the decline.

== Ecology ==
Eagle rays are aquilopelagic rays that use their wing-like pectoral fins for powerful propulsion. Rays move using the vertical muscles in their exaggerated pectoral fins, often flapping these fins up and down in unison. This allows for a flight-like movement along with large leaps out of the water characteristic of other eagle rays. While they do forage and inhabit the bottom, they swim above the seafloor instead of burrowing like other rays. They feed by disturbing the substrate, using their narrow head, to target small inactive prey. They eat crustaceans (such as shrimp), snails, worms, and other invertebrates. Due to their wide variety of prey, the banded eagle ray is considered a generalist species. Their molariform teeth are specialized for grinding up hard-shelled invertebrates. These teeth are replaced continuously throughout the organism's lifetime, allowing them to grow in size and crush larger prey as the fish grows. As benthic feeders, banded eagle rays release nutrients from the sediment via the process of bioturbation. Like other predatory organisms, this species contributes to the biological carbon pump through the production of feces and food falls (see whale fall).

Like most other elasmobranchs, A. nichofii possess a lateral line and electroreception to aid them in sensing their surroundings. The lateral line is composed of pores that lead to an internal channel lined with specialized neurosensory cells. It detects change in fluid flow, providing the organism with information on predator/prey detection, current, and turbulence. Electroreception is the process in which the organism receives directional information through the detection of electric fields in the water. The mechanism of how the field is detected is not certain and an active area of research.

The age of the organism can be estimated in the lab via growth rings found on their vertebrae.

== Reproduction ==
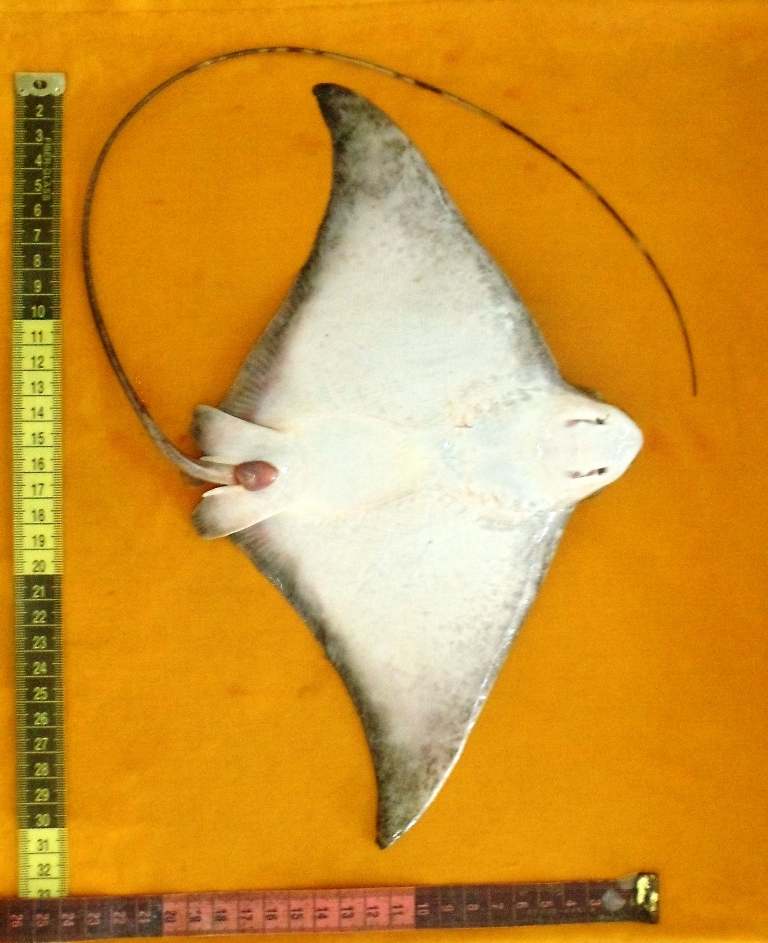
Ventral view of male A. nichofii

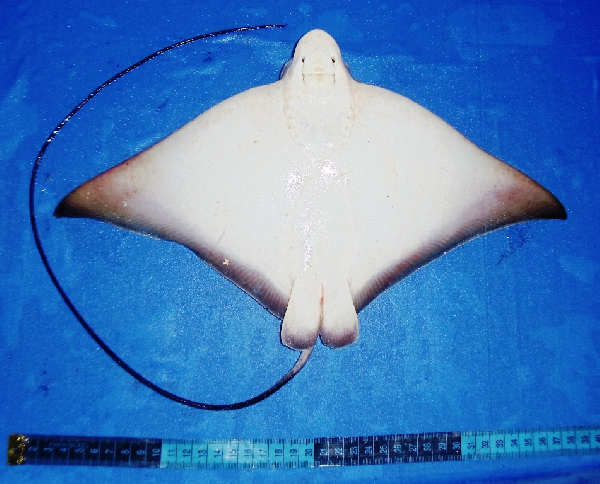
Ventral view of female A. nichofii

While the reproduction of A. nichofii in specific is understudied, the reproduction of Chondrichthyes is well understood and can be applied to the base information on this species. Banded eagle rays exhibit internal fertilization and are ovoviviparous, meaning their eggs develop and hatch within the body, so they birth live pups. They produce about four pups during each gestation period. Pups have a disc width of about 17 cm at birth. Males mature into adults at a disc width between 39 and 42 cm, the maturation size of females is unknown. Males possess reproductive organs known as claspers, which are a pair of grooved extensions at the base of the pelvic fin. One clasper is located on each side of the tail. Females have paired oviducts that lead to paired oviducal glands.

Mating occurs when a male inserts one clasper into the female and transfers semen into her oviduct. In the oviducal gland, the egg is encased in a coat of jelly followed by a tertiary egg envelope. The egg envelope is transferred to the uteri where the egg continues its development. The uterus is crucial in regulating the environment of the egg to maintain appropriate growth conditions. Myliobatidae nurture their eggs via lipid histotrophy, a matrotrophic mode of reproduction. The uterus produces a lipid rich histotrophic “milk” which provides the fetus with the necessary nutrition to develop. The “milk” is secreted from the trophonemata which is in the uterine lining.

== Conservation and Threats ==
According to the IUCN, the banded eagle ray is considered vulnerable, and the species is on the decline. Before its decline, the species was already naturally uncommon in certain areas of its distribution (Sea of Oman, Arabian Sea, and the Red Sea). The IUCN estimated the population has decreased by more than 30% over the last three generations, based on declines in fish catch. They are threatened by habitat loss due to fishery practices such as trawling, which destroy their benthic habitat. In addition to habit loss, trawling threatens this species by increasing the likelihood of bycatch. They are often unintentionally damaged in the trawling process or become caught in the equipment and nets used when fishing for other organisms. Overexploitation of this species by unregulated fisheries is another major threat to A. nichofii. The fish is harvested primarily for its meat and secondarily for its cartilage. Until recently, the banded eagle ray was one of the main commercial species in South-East Asia. The fish was also popular in Thai markets but has become less common since its decline.

Rays are inherently vulnerable to population decline due to their low reproductive output. When coupled with habitat loss, the likelihood of producing a successful generation is very low and a significant conservation concern. A fishery study in Bahrain found a significant sex ratio biased towards males (89:37). This unproportionate ratio lowers the chance of successful reproduction, since females are the limiting sex in population growth. A separate study in Bangladesh classified the banded eagle ray as a “vulnerable ray species” due to fishing pressure enforced by the exploitation of local shark fisheries.

There is currently no conservation efforts geared directly towards the banded eagle ray. One of the biggest conservation inhibitors is the unknown distribution and poor monitoring of eagle rays as a general group. Without knowing where and when these animals occur, scientists cannot create concrete plans to protect them. To increase the surveillance of eagle rays, scientists are experimenting with machine learning. Aerial surveys are used to detect eagle rays which are easy to spot due to their unique shape and relatively large size. The process of gathering footage is relatively easy and efficient, but the manual processing where all the observations and counting occurs is time-consuming and prone to human error. A group in New Caledonia tested out the ability of a deep learning detection model to detect and map eagle rays in a coral reef. After training the model, it successfully detected 92% of eagle rays from the provided images. Similar deep learning detection models have been tested on sea turtles, dugongs, pinniped, and whales, yielding promising outcomes for the future of marine organism monitoring.
