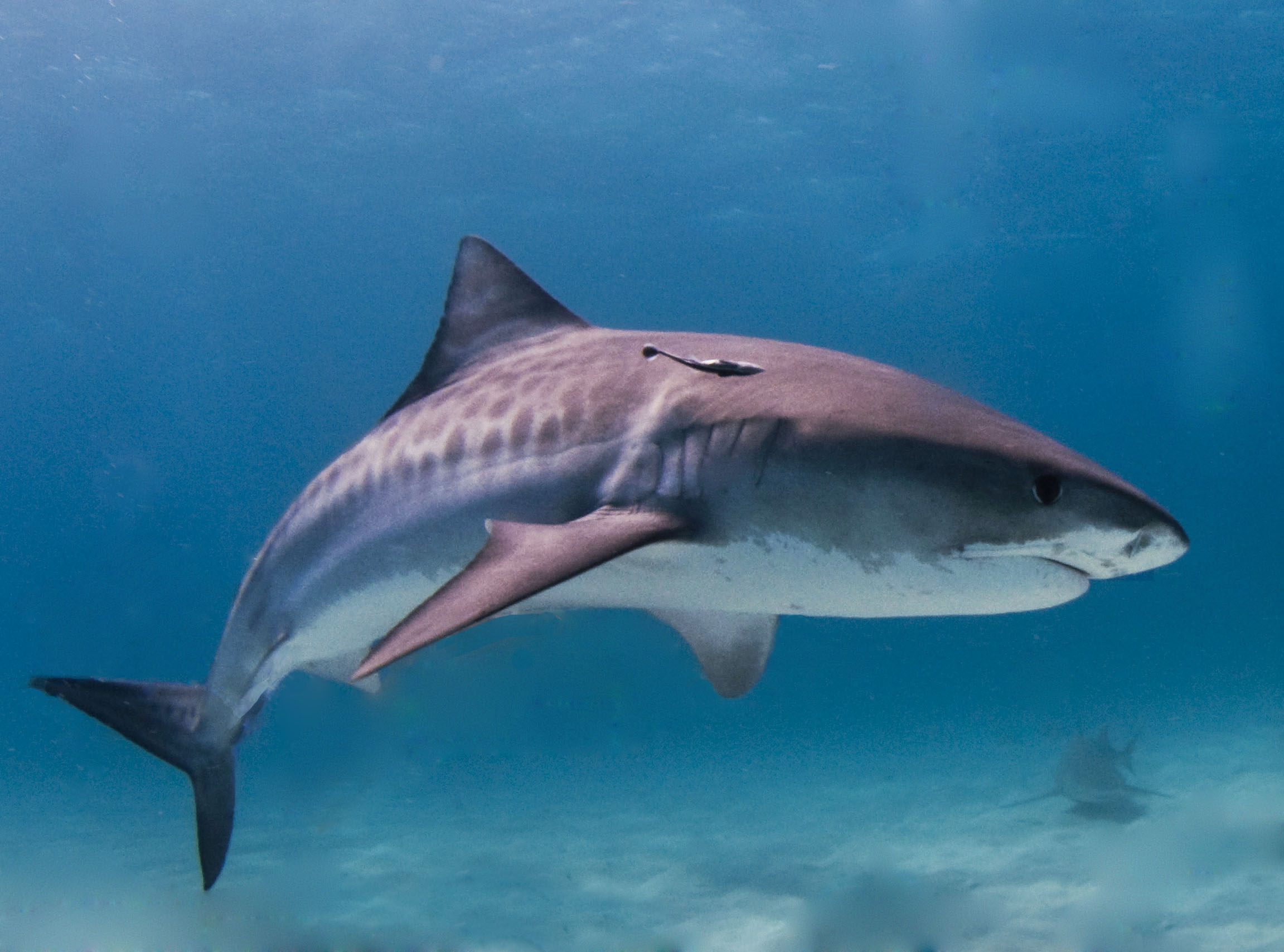
- In the Bahamas

Conservation status
- Near Threatened (IUCN 3.1)

- Apparently Secure (NatureServe)

Scientific classification
- Kingdom: Animalia
- Phylum: Chordata
- Class: Chondrichthyes
- Subclass: Elasmobranchii
- Division: Selachii
- Order: Carcharhiniformes
- Family: Galeocerdonidae
- Genus: Galeocerdo
- Species: G. cuvier

Binomial name
- Galeocerdo cuvier Péron & Lesueur, 1823
- Tiger shark range

Synonyms
- Squalus cuvier Peron and Lesueur, 1822; Galeocerdo tigrinus Müller and Henle, 1837

= Tiger shark =

Tiger shark Temporal range: Middle Miocene–Recent

Species of ground shark

The tiger shark (Galeocerdo cuvier) is a species of ground shark, and the only extant member of the genus Galeocerdo and family Galeocerdonidae. It is a large predator, with females capable of attaining a length of over 5 m (16 ft 5 in). Populations are found in many tropical and temperate waters, especially around central Pacific islands. Its name derives from the dark stripes down its body, which resemble a tiger's pattern and fade as the shark matures.

The tiger shark is a solitary, mostly nocturnal hunter. It is notable for having the widest food spectrum of all sharks, with a range of prey that includes crustaceans, fish, seals, birds, squid, octopuses, sea turtles, sea snakes, dolphins, and even smaller sharks. It also has a reputation as a "garbage eater", consuming a variety of inedible, man-made objects that linger in its stomach. Tiger sharks have only one recorded natural predator, the orca. It is considered a near-threatened species because of finning and fishing by humans.

The tiger shark is second only to the great white in recorded fatal attacks on humans, but these events are still exceedingly rare.

== Taxonomy ==
The shark was first described by Peron and Lesueur in 1822, and was given the name Squalus cuvier. Müller and Henle in 1837 renamed it Galeocerdo tigrinus. The genus, Galeocerdo, is derived from the Greek galeos, which means shark, and kerdo, the word for fox. The species name honors naturalist Georges Cuvier. It is often colloquially called the man-eater shark.

The tiger shark is a member of the order Carcharhiniformes, the most species-rich order of sharks, with more than 270 species also including the small catsharks and hammerhead sharks. Members of this order are characterized by the presence of a nictitating membrane over the eyes, two dorsal fins, an anal fin, and five gill slits. It is the largest member of the order, commonly referred to as ground sharks. It is the only extant member of Galeocerdo, the only member of the family Galeocerdonidae. The oldest remains of Galeocerdo extend back to the Eocene epoch, while the oldest fossils of the modern tiger shark Galeocerdo cuvier date to the Middle Miocene, around 13.8 million years ago.

== Description ==
The tiger shark commonly attains an adult length of 3.5 to 4.7 m (11 ft 6 in – 15 ft 5 in) and weighs between 300 and 900 kg (700 and 2,000 lb). The International Game Fish Association's all-tackle record is 810 kg (1,790 lb). It is sexually dimorphic, with females being the larger sex. Mature females are often over 3.7 m (12 ft 2 in) while mature males rarely get that large. Exceptionally large females reportedly can measure over 5 m (16 ft 5 in), and the largest males 4 m (13 ft 1 in). Weights of particularly large female tiger sharks can exceed 1,300 kg (2,900 lb). One pregnant female caught off Australia reportedly measured 5.5 m (18 ft 1 in) long and weighed 1,524 kg (3,360 lb). Even larger unconfirmed catches have been claimed. Some papers have accepted a record of an exceptional 7.4-metre (24 ft 3 in), 3,110-kilogram (6,860 lb) tiger shark, but since this is far larger than any scientifically observed specimen, verification would be needed. A 2019 study suggested that Pliocene tiger sharks could have reached 8 m (26 ft) in maximum length. There is variation in the speed of growth rates of juvenile tiger sharks depending on the region they inhabit, with some growing close to twice as fast as others.

Among the largest extant sharks, the tiger shark ranks in average size only behind the whale shark (Rhincodon typus), the basking shark (Cetorhinus maximus), and the great white shark (Carcharodon carcharias). This makes it the second-largest predatory shark, after the great white. Some other species such as megamouth sharks (Megachasma pelagios), Pacific sleeper sharks (Somniosus pacificus), Greenland sharks (Somniosus microcephalus), and bluntnose sixgill sharks (Hexanchus griseus) broadly overlap in size with the tiger shark, but as these species are comparatively poorly studied, whether their typical mature size matches that of the tiger shark is unclear. The great hammerhead (Sphyrna mokarran), a member of the same taxonomic order as the tiger shark, has a similar or even greater average body length, but is lighter and less bulky, with a maximum known weight coming from a heavily pregnant 4.4 m (14 ft) long individual at 580 kg (1,280 lb).

Tiger shark teeth are unique with very sharp, pronounced serrations and an unmistakable sideways-pointing tip. Such dentition has developed to slice through flesh, bone, and other tough substances, such as turtle shells. Like most sharks, its teeth are continually replaced by rows of new teeth throughout the shark's life. Relative to the shark's size, tiger shark teeth are considerably shorter than those of a great white shark, but they are nearly as broad at the root as the great white's teeth and are arguably better suited to slicing through hard-surfaced prey.

A tiger shark generally has long fins to provide lift as the shark maneuvers through water, while the long upper tail provides bursts of speed. The tiger shark normally swims using small body movements.

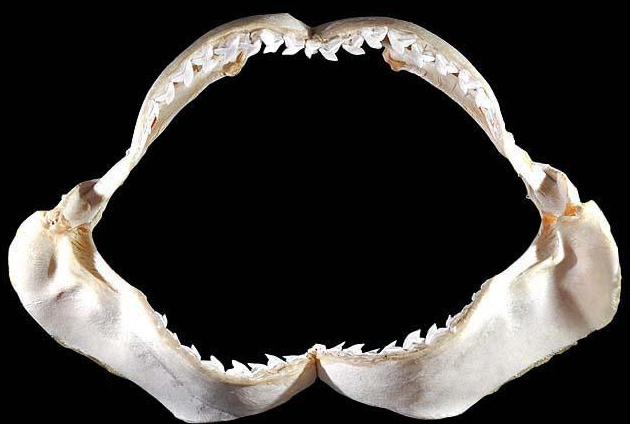
Jaws

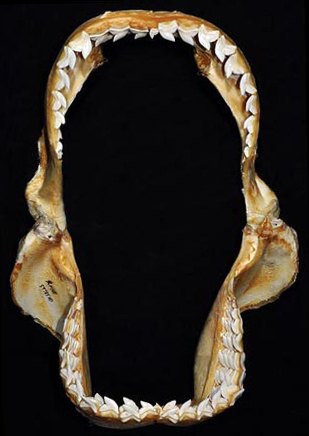
Jaws, wide open

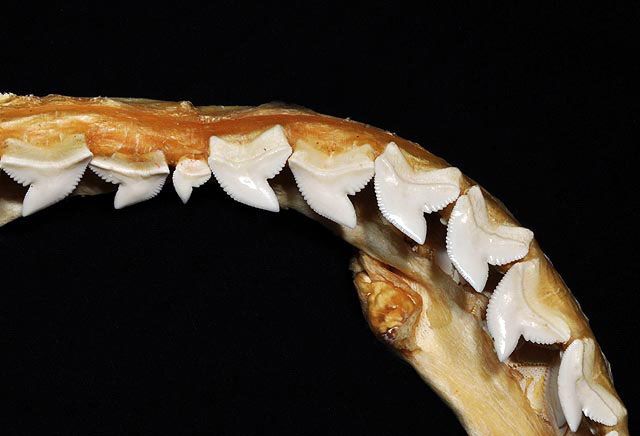
Upper teeth

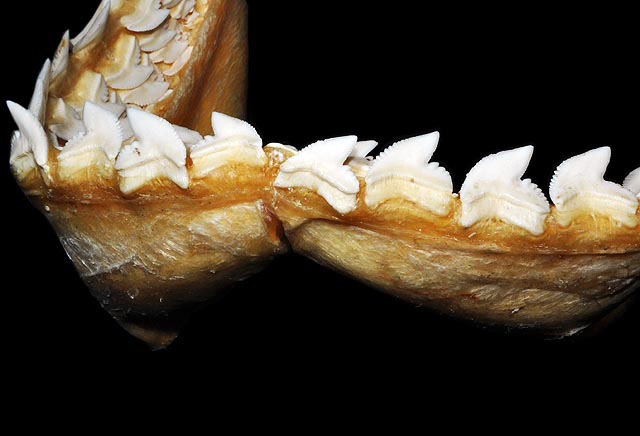
Lower teeth

=== Skin ===
The skin of a tiger shark can typically range from gray-blue to light green-gray with a white or light-yellow underbelly. The advantage of this is that when it is hunting for its prey, when prey looks at the shark from above, the shark will be camouflaged, since the water below is darker. When prey is below the shark and looks up the light underbelly will also camouflage the shark with the sunlight. This is known as countershading. Dark spots and stripes are most visible in young sharks and fade as the shark matures. Its head is somewhat wedge-shaped, which makes it easy to turn quickly to one side. They have small pits on the snout which hold electroreceptors called the ampullae of Lorenzini, which enable them to detect electric fields, including the weak electrical impulses generated by prey, which helps them to hunt. Tiger sharks also have a sensory organ called a lateral line which extends on their flanks down most of the length of their sides. The primary role of this structure is to detect minute vibrations in the water. These adaptations allow the tiger shark to hunt in darkness and detect hidden prey.

=== Vision ===
Sharks do not have moveable upper or lower eyelids, but the tiger shark—among other sharks—has a nictitating membrane, which is a white eyelid that can cover the eye. Tiger sharks are born with light gray irises that darken and change color as they age, ranging in color from dark gray to dark brown as adults. A reflective layer behind the tiger shark's retina, called the tapetum lucidum, allows light-sensing cells a second chance to capture photons of visible light. This enhances vision in low-light conditions.

== Distribution and habitat ==
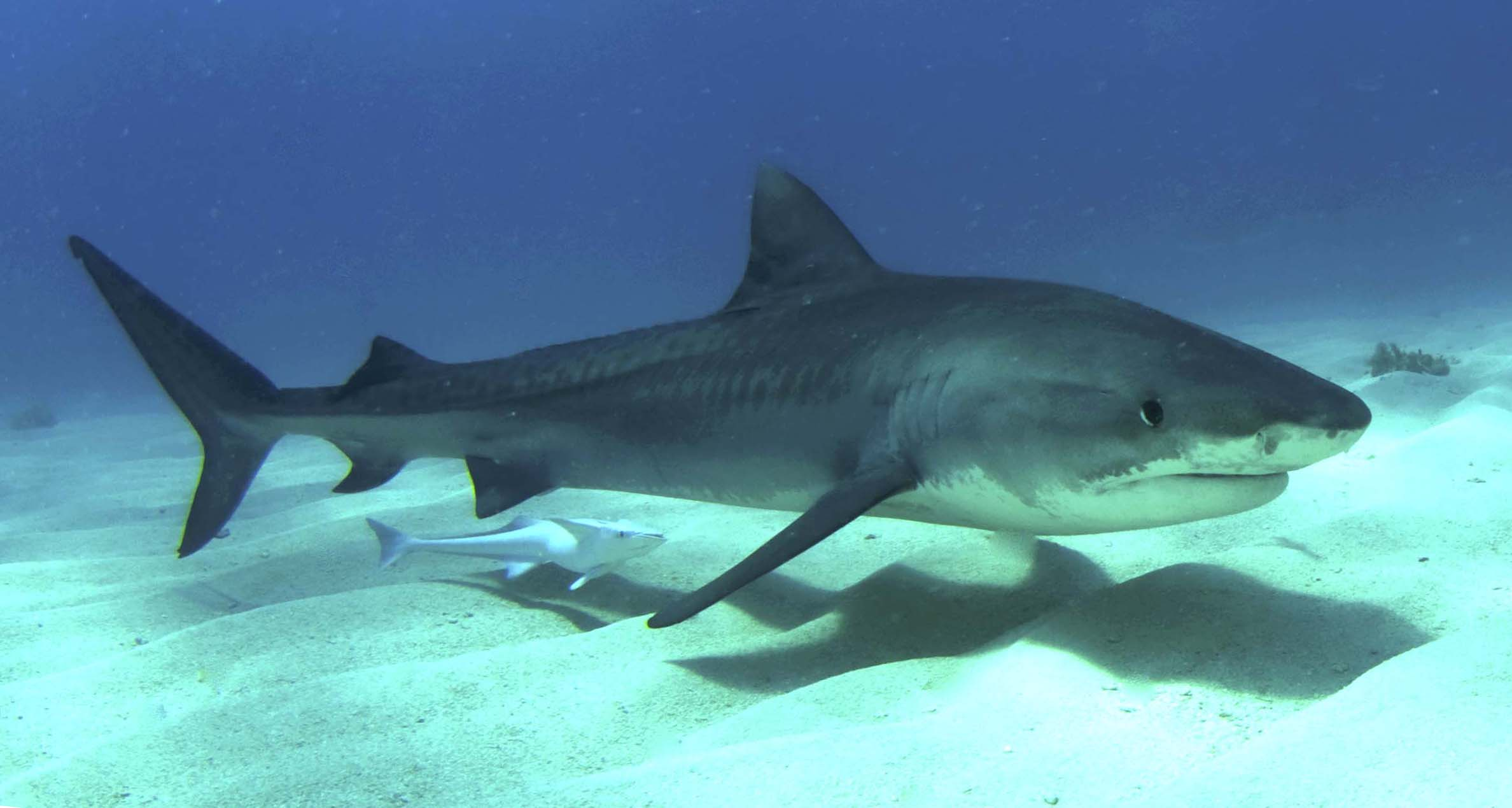
Juvenile tiger shark in the Bahamas

Video of juvenile female tiger shark at Lord Howe Island, Australia, from PLOS ONE

The tiger shark is often found close to the coast, mainly in tropical and subtropical waters throughout the world. Its behavior is primarily nomadic, but is guided by warmer currents, and it stays closer to the equator throughout the colder months. It tends to stay in deep waters that line reefs, but it does move into channels to pursue prey in shallower waters. In the western Pacific Ocean, the shark has been found as far north as Japan and as far south as New Zealand. It has also been recorded in the Mediterranean Sea, but rarely, off Malaga (Spain), Sicily (Italy) and Libya.

Fuvahmulah, an island in the Maldives, has been identified as home to the world's largest known aggregation of tiger sharks (Galeocerdo cuvier).

The finding is based on a long-term scientific study using non-invasive methods such as photo identification and laser photogrammetry, which recorded at least 239 individual tiger sharks in the waters around the island. The aggregation is considered unique due to its size and the high level of site fidelity shown by the sharks, particularly adult females.

Researchers suggest that the waters surrounding Fuvahmulah provide favourable conditions for gestation, including warm temperatures and a consistent food supply, making the area an important habitat for tiger shark reproduction and conservation.

The discovery has also been highlighted in regional reporting as a significant ecological feature of the Maldives, further establishing Fuvahmulah as a global hotspot for tiger shark aggregation.

Tiger sharks can be seen in the Gulf of Mexico, North American beaches, and parts of South America. It is also commonly observed in the Caribbean Sea. Other locations where tiger sharks are seen include off Africa, China, India, Australia, and Indonesia. Certain tiger sharks have been recorded at depths approaching 900 m (3,000 ft).

== Feeding ==
The tiger shark is an apex predator and has a reputation for eating almost anything. These predators swim close inland to eat at night, and during the day swim out into deeper waters. Young tiger sharks are found to feed largely on small fish, as well as various small jellyfish, and mollusks including cephalopods. Around the time they attain 2.3 m (7.5 ft), or near sexual maturity, their selection expands considerably, and much larger animals become regular prey. Numerous fish, mollusks (including gastropods and cephalopods), crustaceans, sea birds, sea snakes, marine mammals (e.g. bottlenose dolphins (Tursiops), common dolphins (Delphinus), spotted dolphins (Stenella), dugongs (Dugong dugon), seals, and sea lions), and sea turtles (including the three largest species: the leatherback (Dermochelys coriacea), the loggerhead (Caretta caretta) and the green sea turtles (Chelonia mydas)), are regularly eaten by adult tiger sharks. In fact, adult sea turtles have been found in up to 20.8% of studied tiger shark stomachs, indicating somewhat of a dietary preference for sea turtles where they are commonly encountered. They also eat other sharks (including adult sandbar sharks (Carcharhinus plumbeus)), as well as rays, and even sometimes other tiger sharks.

Due to high risk of predation, dolphins often avoid regions inhabited by tiger sharks. Injured or ailing whales may also be attacked and eaten. A group was documented killing an ailing humpback whale (Megaptera novaeangliae) in 2006 near Hawaii. A scavenger, the tiger shark will feed on dead whales, and has been documented doing so alongside great white sharks. Tiger sharks have also been observed to feed on dead manta rays in the German Channel of Palau.

Evidence of dugong predation was identified in one study that found dugong tissue in 15 of 85 tiger sharks caught off the Australian coast. Additionally, examination of adult dugongs has shown scars from failed shark attacks. To minimize attacks, dugong microhabitats shift similarly to those of known tiger shark prey when the sharks are abundant.

The broad, heavily calcified jaws and nearly terminal mouth, combined with robust, serrated teeth, enable the tiger shark to take on these large prey. In addition, excellent eyesight and acute sense of smell enable it to react to faint traces of blood and follow them to the source. The ability to pick up low-frequency pressure waves enables the shark to advance towards an animal with confidence, even in murky water. The shark circles its prey and studies it by prodding it with its snout. When attacking, the shark often eats its prey whole, although larger prey are often eaten in gradual large bites and finished over time.

Notably, terrestrial mammals, including horses (Equus ferus caballus), goats (Capra aegagrus hircus), sheep (Ovis aries), dogs (Canis lupus familiaris), cats (Felis catus), and brown rats (Rattus norvegicus), are fairly common in the stomach contents of tiger sharks around the coasts of Hawaii. In one case, remains of two flying foxes were found in the stomach of this shark, and in another, an echidna (Tachyglossus aculeatus) was regurgitated by a tiger shark being tagged off Orpheus Island, Queensland. Because of its aggressive and indiscriminate feeding style, it often mistakenly eats inedible objects, such as automobile license plates, oil cans, tires, and baseballs. Due to their habits of eating essentially anything, Tiger sharks are often referred to as the "garbage can of the sea".

=== Predation by orcas ===
Tiger sharks are preyed on by orcas. Orcas have been recorded hunting and killing tiger sharks by holding them upside down to induce tonic immobility in order to drown the shark. The orcas bite off the shark's fins before disemboweling and devouring it.

=== Swimming efficiency and stealth ===
All tiger sharks generally swim slowly, which, combined with cryptic coloration, may make them difficult for prey to detect in some habitats. They are especially well camouflaged against dark backgrounds. Despite their sluggish appearance, tiger sharks are one of the strongest swimmers of the carcharhinid sharks. Once the shark has come close, a speed burst allows it to reach the intended prey before it can escape.

== Reproduction ==
Males reach sexual maturity at 2.3 to 2.9 m (7.5 to 9.5 ft) and females at 2.5 to 3.5 m (8.2 to 11.5 ft). Typical weight of relatively young sexually mature specimens, which often locally comprise the majority of tiger sharks encountered per game-fishing and scientific studies, is around 80 to 130 kg (180 to 290 lb). Females mate once every three years.

=== Brooding ===
The tiger shark is the only species in its family that is ovoviviparous; its eggs hatch internally and the young are born live when fully developed. Tiger sharks are unique among all sharks in the fact that they employ embrytrophy to nourish their young inside the womb. The young gestate in sacks filled with a nourishing fluid. This allows the young to dramatically increase in size, even without a placental connection to the mother.

The young develop inside the mother's body up to 16 months. Litters range from 10 to 80 pups. A newborn is generally 51 to 76 cm (20 to 30 in) long. How long tiger sharks live is unknown, but they can live longer than 12 years.

=== Mating ===
They breed by internal fertilization. The male inserts one of his claspers into the female's genital opening (cloaca), acting as a guide for the sperm. The male uses his teeth to hold the female still during the procedure, often causing the female considerable discomfort. Mating in the Northern Hemisphere generally takes place between March and May, with birth between April and June the following year. In the Southern Hemisphere, mating takes place in November, December, or early January.

A 2026 study reported that Olowalu, Hawaii is a mating site for these animals, the first to have been identified. The animals gather during the same winter period used by Northern Pacific humpback whales for mating and nursing offspring, possibly so that the sharks can prey on humpback calves.

=== Ontogeny ===
Tiger shark ontogeny has been little studied until recently, but studies by Hammerschlag et al., indicated that as they grow, their tails become more symmetrical with age. Additionally, while the heads on juvenile tiger sharks are more conical and similar to requiem sharks, adult tiger sharks have a head which is relatively broader. The reason for the larger caudal fin on juvenile tiger sharks is theorized to be an adaptation to escape predation by larger predators and to catch quicker-moving prey. As tiger sharks mature, their head also becomes much wider and their tails no longer become as large in proportion to their body size as when they are juveniles because they do not face elevated levels of predation risk upon maturity. The results of this study were interpreted as reflecting two ecological transitions: as tiger sharks mature they become more migratory and having a symmetrical tail is more advantageous in long-distance traveling, and that tiger sharks consume more diverse prey items with age, which requires a greater bite force and broader head.

== Conservation ==
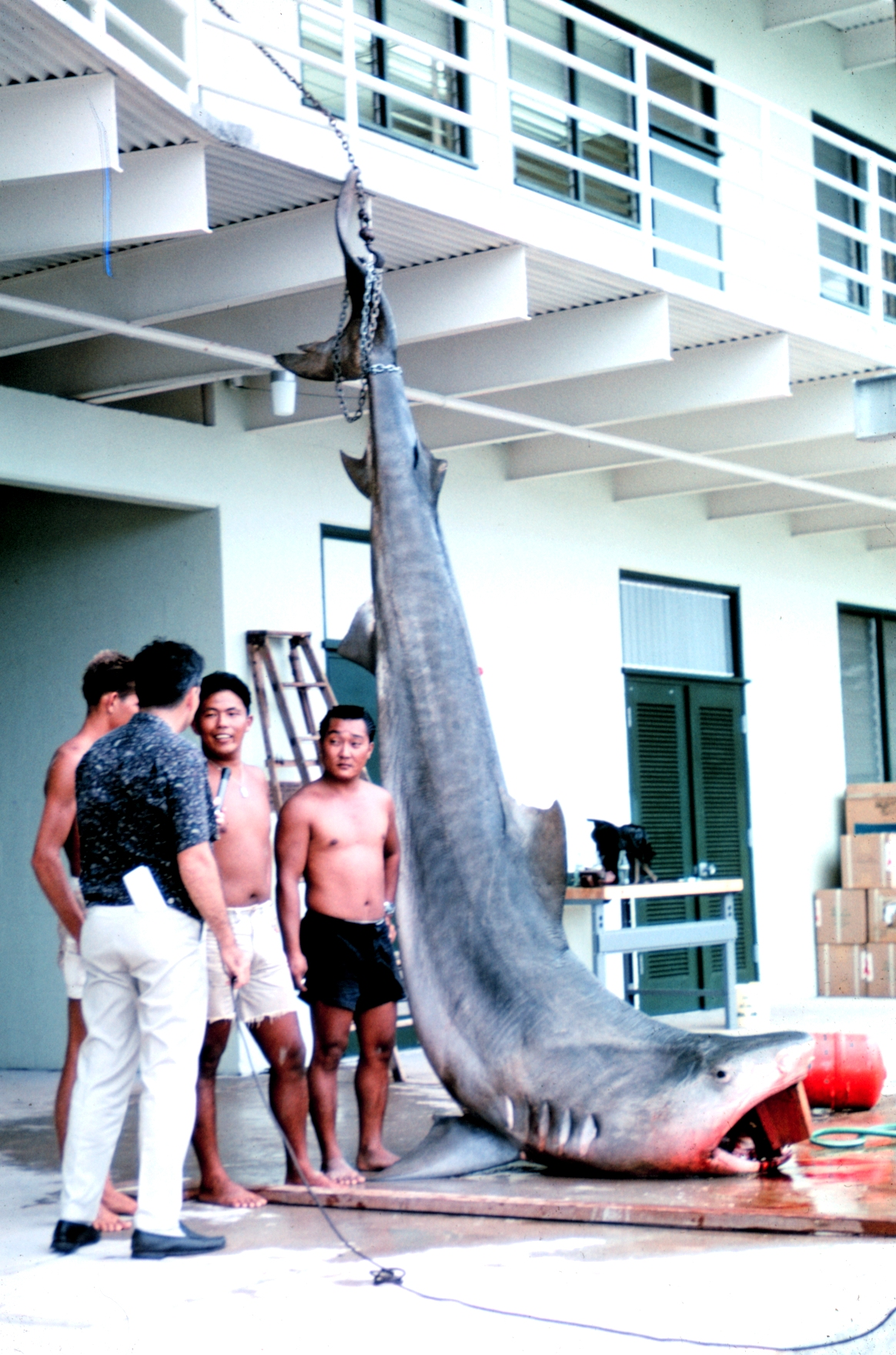
A large female tiger shark caught in Kaneʻohe Bay, Oʻahu in 1966

The tiger shark is captured and killed for its fins, flesh, and liver. It is caught regularly in target and nontarget fisheries. Several populations have declined where they have been heavily fished. Continued demand for fins may result in further declines. They are considered a near threatened species due to excessive finning and fishing by humans according to International Union for Conservation of Nature. In June 2018, the New Zealand Department of Conservation classified the tiger shark as "Migrant" with the qualifier "Secure Overseas" under the New Zealand Threat Classification System.

While shark fin has very few nutrients, shark liver has a high concentration of vitamin A, which is used in the production of vitamin oils. In addition, the tiger shark is captured and killed for its distinct skin, as well as by big-game fishers.

In 2010, Greenpeace International added the tiger shark to its seafood red list, which is a list of commonly sold fish likely to come from unsustainable fisheries.

== Relationship with humans ==
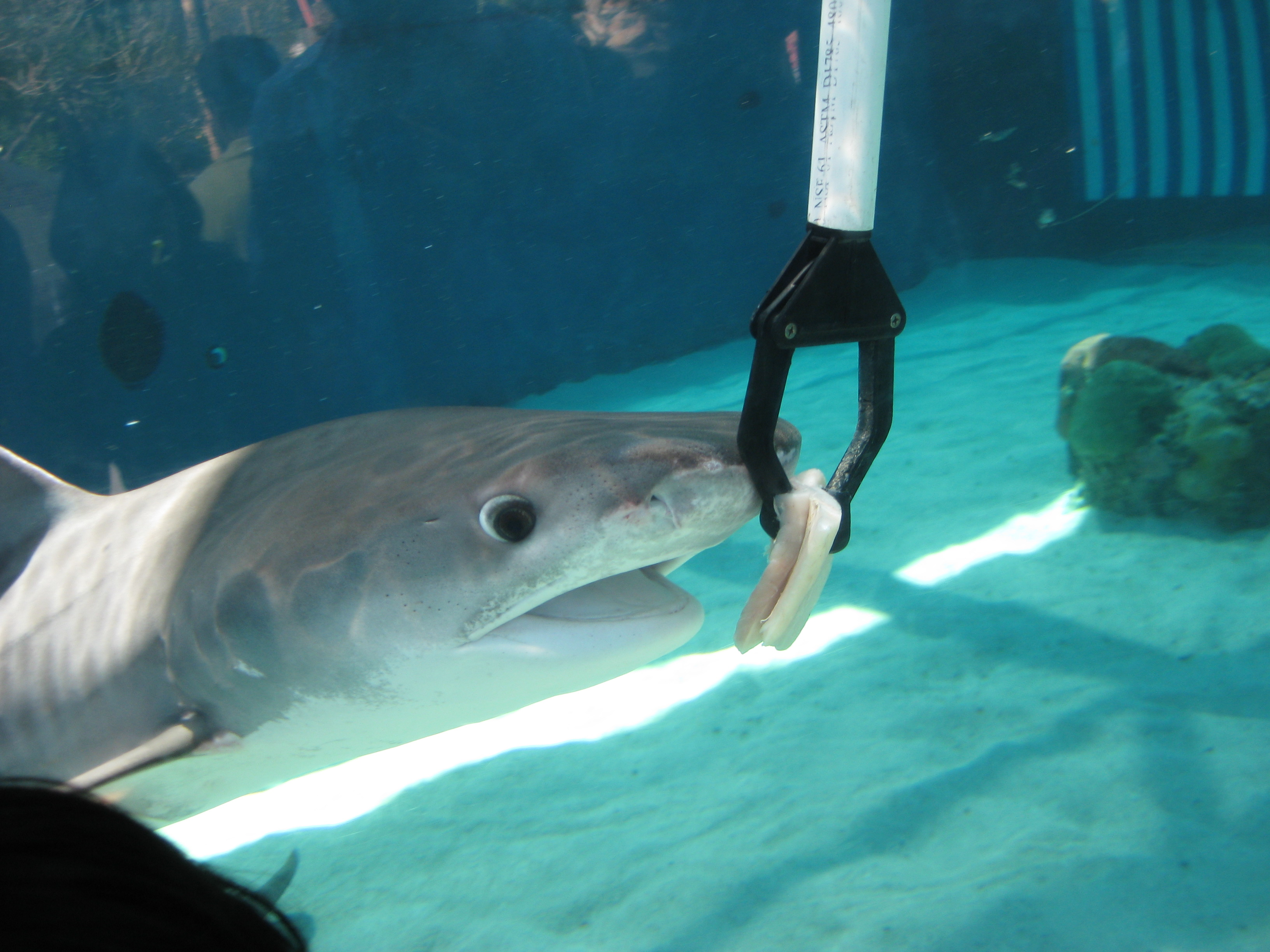
A female tiger shark pup in the Aquarium of the Pacific's Shark Lagoon exhibit

Although sharks rarely bite humans, the tiger shark is reported to be responsible for a large share of fatal shark-bite incidents, and is regarded as one of the most dangerous shark species. They often visit shallow reefs, harbors, and canals, creating the potential for encounter with humans. The tiger shark also dwells in river mouths and other runoff-rich water. While it ranks second on the list of number of recorded shark attacks on humans, behind only the great white shark, such attacks are few and very seldom fatal. Typically, three to four shark bites occur per year in Hawaii; one notable survivor of such an attack is surfing champion Bethany Hamilton, who lost her left arm at age 13 to a tiger shark in 2003. This bite rate is very low, considering that thousands of people swim, surf, and dive in Hawaiian waters every day. Human interactions with tiger sharks in Hawaiian waters have been shown to increase between September and November, when tiger shark females are believed to migrate to the islands to give birth.

On 8 June 2023, a tiger shark attacked and killed a 23-year-old Russian man in the Red Sea off the coast of the Egyptian city of Hurghada. The attack was filmed by onlookers and the recording went viral. The shark was later captured by fishermen and killed. This was the third fatal tiger shark attack in the area since 2022.

Between 1959 and 1976, 4,668 tiger sharks were culled in the state of Hawaii in an effort to protect the tourism industry. Despite damaging the shark population, these efforts were shown to be ineffective in decreasing the number of interactions between humans and tiger sharks. Feeding sharks in Hawaii (except for traditional Hawaiian cultural or religious practices) is illegal, and interaction with them, such as cage diving, is discouraged. South African shark behaviorist and shark diver Mark Addison demonstrated divers could interact and dive with them outside of a shark cage in a 2007 Discovery Channel special, and underwater photographer Fiona Ayerst swam with them in the Bahamas. At "Tiger Beach" off Grand Bahama, uncaged diving with – and even the handling of – female tiger sharks has become a routine occurrence.

Warming Atlantic Ocean currents have caused tiger shark migration paths to move further north, according to a University of Miami study.

== See also ==
- List of sharks
- List of prehistoric cartilaginous fish genera
