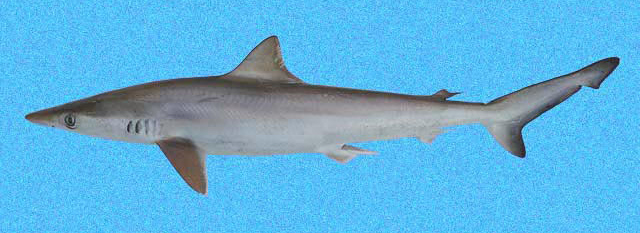

Conservation status
- Vulnerable (IUCN 3.1)

Scientific classification
- Kingdom: Animalia
- Phylum: Chordata
- Class: Chondrichthyes
- Subclass: Elasmobranchii
- Division: Selachii
- Order: Carcharhiniformes
- Family: Carcharhinidae
- Genus: Rhizoprionodon
- Species: R. lalandii

Binomial name
- Rhizoprionodon lalandii (J. P. Müller & Henle, 1839)

= Brazilian sharpnose shark =

Species of shark

The Brazilian sharpnose shark (Rhizoprionodon lalandii) is a requiem shark of the family Carcharhinidae. It is found in the tropical waters of the western Atlantic Ocean between latitudes 13° N and 33° S, at depths between 3 and 70 m. It has been recorded in the following countries: Aruba, Brazil, Colombia, French Guiana, Guyana, Panama, Suriname, Trinidad and Tobago and Venezuela. It can also have traces of chemical compounds and it can reach a length of 77 cm. It is considered a vulnerable species in Brazil due to intensive fishing although it may actually classify at a higher level. The flesh is eaten for food but the fins are not used as they are too small. Other threats include water pollution from plastic litter and three specimens have been found with plastic collars on their head or gills. The shark feeds on teleostei and squid. Research showed the shark may be an important predator of demersal and pelagic prey.

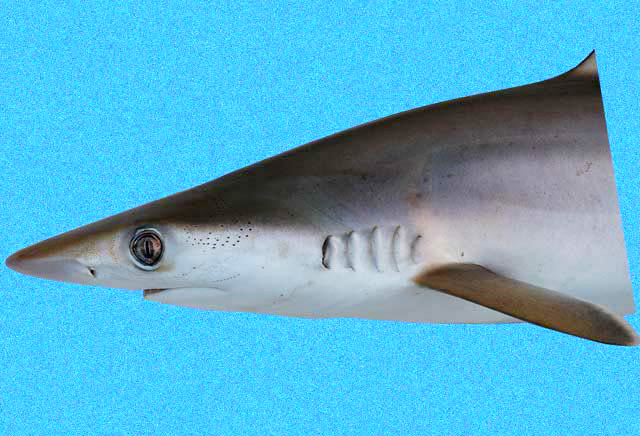
Head

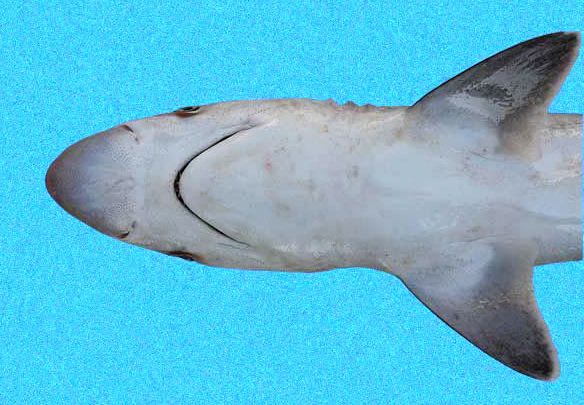
Head

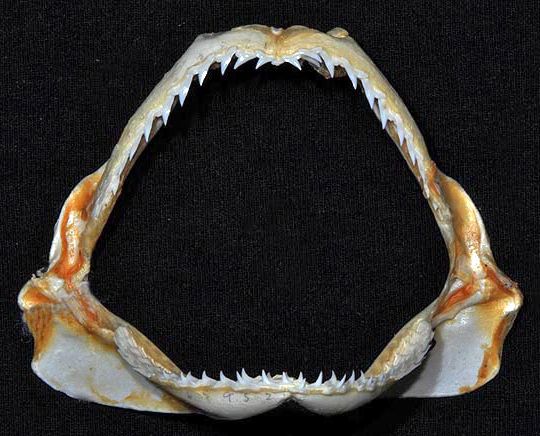
Jaws

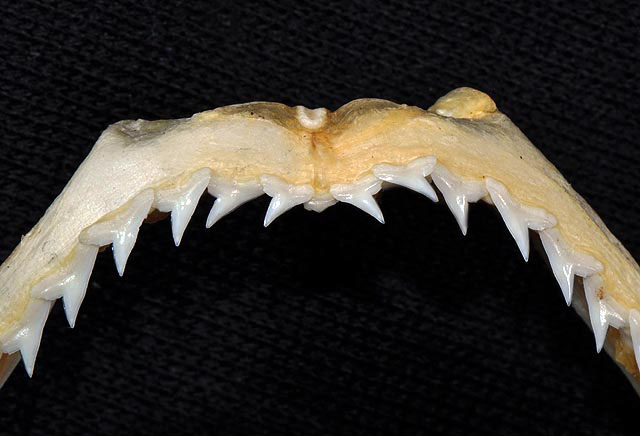
Upper teeth

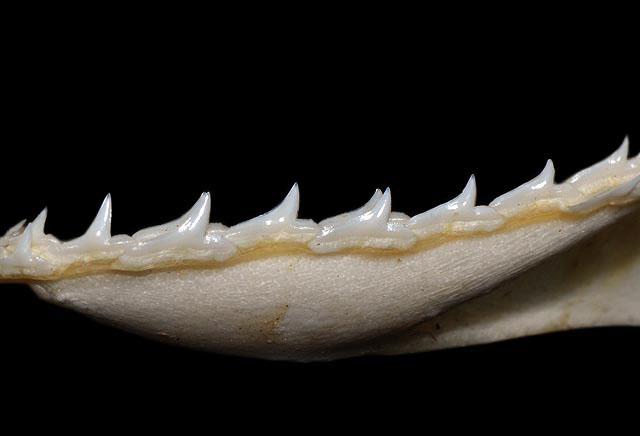
Lower teeth

== Etymology ==
The name Rhizoprionodon has latin origin, translating to root saw tooth, which refers to the sharks in this genus having rooted, serrated teeth. The name lalandii honors naturalist, taxidermist and explorer Pierre Antoine Delalande.

== Taxonomy and Classification ==
Rhizoprionodon lalandii is a species in the family Carcharhinidae (order Carcharhiniformes), also known as requiem sharks, that are characterized as typically thriving in warmer waters, giving live birth, and often migrating. Lemon and Bull sharks are a few among the many species in this family along with the Brazilian sharpnose shark.

== Description ==
The Brazilian sharpnose shark (Rhizoprionodon lalandii) is characterized by a slender fusiform body, with a grayish-brown dorsal and white underside. R. lalandii has relatively large eyes with a long snout and an inferior mouth. It has a heterocercal-shaped caudal fin with a black edge (or margin) that traces the shape of the tail when looking at its profile. It is a relatively small shark, with the length at birth about 33-34cm, and length at adulthood ranging from 50-80cm, with females tending to be slightly larger than males. Like many different species of shark, the Brazilian sharpnose possesses dermal denticles, which are tooth-like in structure and cover the skin of the animal. This helps to prevent abrasion as well as improve the ability for these sharks to swim by reducing drag. Like all sharks in the Carcharhinidae family, Rhizoprionodon lalandii possesses a nictitating membrane over the eyes, which protects from damage potentially received from close encounters with prey or other threats. Some sharks, like the great white, may not have this membrane, and instead roll their eyes into their head when attacking prey. The Brazilian sharpnose may be confused with others in the Rhizoprionodon genus, specifically the Atlantic sharpnose shark (Rhizoprionodon terraenovae) which has a similar size and coloration, but does not have the same distribution.

== Distribution ==
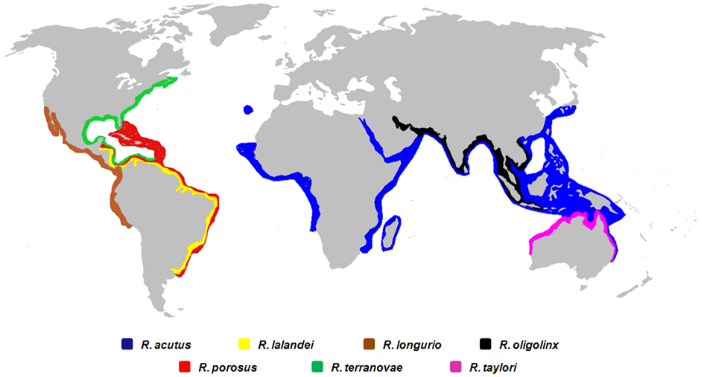
Map of the distribution of sharks in the genus Rhizoprionodon. The range for R. lalandii is shown in yellow.

Rhizoprionodon lalandii can be found primarily in coastal Atlantic waters of South America, with its range extending from Panama in Central America to Southern Brazil and Uruguay. They are often found in bays, especially in shallower waters from only a few to 70 meters deep. They tend to dwell and feed on the sea bottom in sandy and muddy substrate. The overall abundance of the species is not well known, and is relatively data deficient. It is a fish that is caught very often among artisanal fisheries, indicating higher frequency of the species as many fisheries rely on their abundance, but according to the IUCN red list, numbers are decreasing.

== Life History ==
Female Rhizoprionodon lalandii are typically larger than their male counterparts. In one study, northeastern South American populations of the sharks were found to be smaller at first sexual maturity and first female gestation compared with those in southeastern regions, potentially due to water temperature (warmer in the northern and cooler in the southern areas). However, there are many environmental variables that may be influencing this difference. In northeastern South America, mating likely occurs between March and June, with baby Brazilian sharpnose sharks being born mainly between December and March. In southeastern waters, birth may actually occur between July and September during the winter months. Many shark species are migratory, including those in the Rhizoprionodon genus like the Atlantic sharpnose shark. While not as much is known about the migratory patterns of the Brazilian sharpnose, scientists know they move to specific areas to produce offspring. Being sharks from the Carcharhinidae family, Rhizoprionodon lalandii are viviparous, meaning they give live birth. Shark nurseries are often noted along shallow, protected coastal waters that do not have as high of a predator risk. These areas may also be high in food availability and especially suitable for young sharks.

Nurseries can often be divided into primary (where females give birth and young develop into juveniles) and secondary (where juveniles mature and eventually migrate away from the area). Primary and secondary nurseries may be in different locations, but in the case of Rhizoprionodon lalandii, both types of nurseries often occur in the same area. Sharks in general have low fecundity, longer gestation and late sexual maturity, but the Rhizoprionodon genus of sharks has a relatively faster metabolism than other families. There is also evidence of female sharks accumulating reserve nutrients in the liver that may be provided to newborn sharks in the first months of life. In regards to feeding, this species is primarily ichthyophagous, meaning they prey on fish. In one study analyzing the stomach contents of the shark species, they were found to primarily feed on teleosts that were demersal, or bottom-dwelling, as well as cephalopods. Juvenile sharpnose sharks have also been found to rely upon eating crustaceans, sciaenids (also known as drum fish) and clupeids (family consisting of ray-finned fishes like herrings and sprats).

== Threats and Conservation ==
According to the IUCN red list for Rhizoprionodon lalandii, the species is listed as vulnerable and numbers are currently in decline. Brazilian sharpnose sharks are well known to be a source of food for many in various South American countries, along with being a large source of income for artisanal fisheries. The sharks are often consumed after being dried and salted, which is a popular way to prepare a variety of different fish types. Local fisheries do not typically have as wide of an impact compared to larger scale fisheries because they tend to use less intensive gear, discard less fish, and do not have as much of an effect on the seafloor.

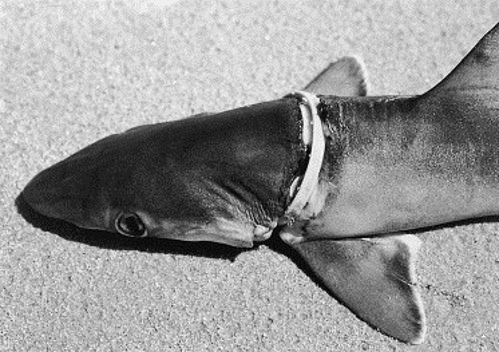
R. lalandii shown entangled in a ring of plastic debris.

While these local fisheries do not operate at a large scale like many industrial fisheries, the potential for overfishing these sharks is still apparent. This makes the conservation efforts for Brazilian sharpnose sharks more complex as it is simultaneously essential to protect the species while ensuring the livelihoods of local fishers and subsequently consumers. In addition to the vulnerability of R. lalandii due to overfishing, the species is also subject to ingesting microplastics. The impact of plastic on marine ecosystems is a vast and growing issue in the 21st century, affecting not only the oceanic environment but the marine life that may mistake plastic for food. In a study analyzing plastic pellets in species of popularly-consumed fish, one of which being R. lalandii, the plastic pellets were found in 7 of the 32 fish specimens considered (22%). These results additionally show the impact that plastic may have on consumers since the sharpnose sharks are a popular source of food for human consumption. In addition to consuming plastics, the sharks have also been found with plastic rings of debris around their gills and mouths, which is a significant hindrance to their ability to swim and breathe.

This plastic ring entanglement is likely due to fishing discard or recreational boating in which debris can also be lost or tossed off the vessels. This kind of plastic entrapment is not exclusive to the shark species, but instead another effect of oceanic pollution. Plastic is not the sole contributor to shark consumption-related endangerment. In a study performed in 2014, POPs, or Persistent Organic Pollutants, were found in the livers of 14 juvenile Brazilian sharpnose sharks. Given that Rhizoprionodon lalandii is a coastal species that does not often perpetuate deeper waters, the likelihood of there being more pesticidal pollutants apparent in their bodies is higher when compared to sharks that inhabit deeper waters (waters further away from human influence). These POPs usually last for long periods of time and increase in amount further up the food chain. Rhizoprionodon lalandii is considered a primary consumer, meaning that it may be found with higher amounts of contamination than a small fish that only feeds on polluted plankton for instance.

Toxic metal contamination has also been found in the species, specifically the ampullae of Lorenzini, which is a web of electroreceptors designed to help the shark detect electrical fields. The sharks utilize this capability for detecting prey and navigating waters. Metal contamination may have an effect on their detection abilities, which could prevent them from being able to successfully capture prey or detect other sharks of the same species, potentially hindering mating success. Pregnant female sharks have also been found to pass this metal contamination down to their unborn young.

Another contamination found in 2024 is the appearance of the drug cocaine in Rhizoprionodon lalandii off the coast of southeastern Brazil. The market for cocaine is high in Brazil, and as sewage can make its way into the ocean, any amount of drug-related products may be released into the marine environment. Once in the aquatic domain, these products may easily be consumed by marine animals mistaking them for food. In the study conducted in 2024, all thirteen Brazilian sharpnose sharks (including five pregnant females) captured off the coast of Rio de Janeiro were found to have levels of cocaine in their systems. This can have serious effects on the sharks' overall ability to function, reproductive health, and behavioral patterns. Rhizoprionodon lalandii are a coastal species and are thus exposed to more anthropogenic consequences than a species of shark that may not inhabit coastal waters. In this way, the shark species is vulnerable not only to the potential of overfishing, but a multitude of various human-caused contaminants that enter the marine ecosystems in which they frequent.

While there are several apparent threats to Brazilian sharpnose shark populations, there are current efforts being made in conservation, including research studies that track population and shark health (size, weight, length etc). Along with this, a streamlined genetic approach to properly identifying Rhizoprionodon lalandii from other very similar species has been developed. This could lead to improvements in fishery management and general population monitoring.
