= Gestation =

Period during the carrying of an embryo

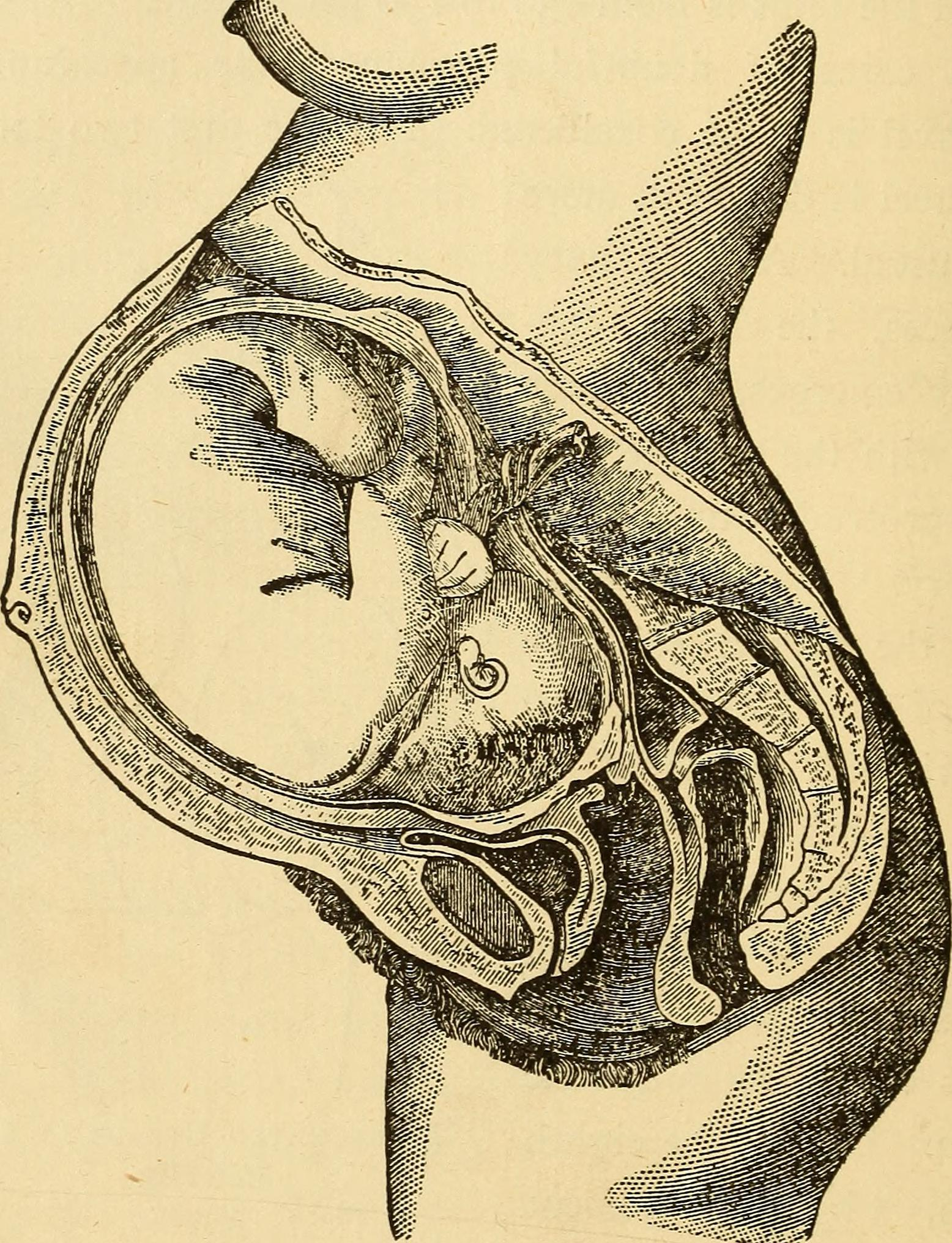
Drawing of a fetus in utero.

Gestation is the period of development during the carrying of an embryo, and later fetus, inside viviparous animals (the embryo develops within the parent). It is typical for mammals, but also occurs for some non-mammals. Mammals during pregnancy can have one or more gestations at the same time, for example in a multiple birth.

The time interval of a gestation is called the gestation period. In obstetrics, gestational age refers to the time since the onset of the last menses, which on average is fertilization age plus two weeks.

== Mammals ==
In mammals, pregnancy begins when a zygote (fertilized ovum) implants in the female's uterus and ends once the fetus leaves the uterus during labor or an abortion (whether induced or spontaneous).

=== Humans ===
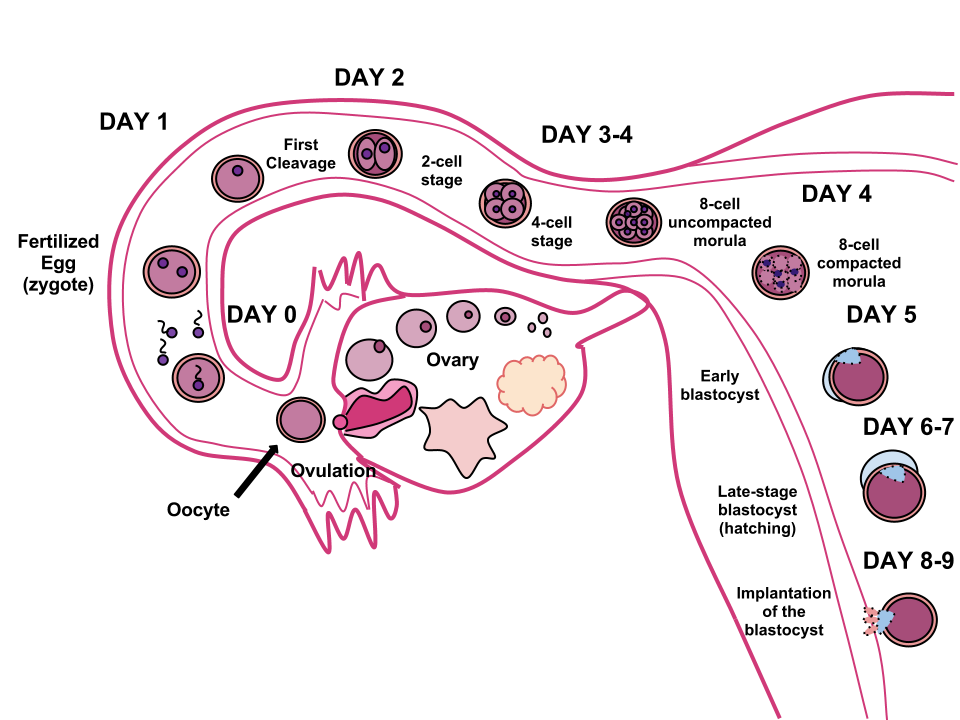
Timeline of human fertilization

In humans, pregnancy can be defined clinically, biochemically or biologically. Clinically, pregnancy starts from first day of the mother's last period. Biochemically, pregnancy starts when a woman's human chorionic gonadotropin (hCG) levels rise above 25 mIU/mL. Biologically, pregnancy starts at implantation of the fertilized egg.

Human pregnancy can be divided into three trimesters, each approximately three months long: the first, second, and third trimester. The first trimester is from the last menstrual period through the 13th week, the second trimester is 14th–28/29th week, and the third trimester is 29/30th–42nd week. Birth normally occurs at a gestational age of about 40 weeks, though it is common for births to occur from 37 to 42 weeks. Labor occurring prior to 37 weeks gestation is considered preterm labor and can result from multiple factors, including previous preterm deliveries.

Prenatal care is important for the maintenance of a healthy pregnancy and surveillance of related complications. In high-income countries, prenatal care typically involves monthly visits during the first two trimesters, with an increasing number of visits closer to delivery. At these visits, healthcare providers will evaluate a variety of parental and fetal metrics, including fetal growth and heart rate, birth defects, maternal blood pressure, among others.

After birth, health care providers will measure the baby's weight, vital signs, reflexes, head circumference, muscle tone, and posture to help determine the gestational age.

Various factors can influence the duration of gestation, including diseases in pregnancy and adequate prenatal care. The rates of morbidity and pre-existing diseases that predispose mothers to life-threatening, pregnancy-related complications in the United States are increasing. Inaccessibility of prenatal care may partially explain this ongoing disparity.

=== Placental mammals ===
During gestation in placental mammals, there is a gradual physiological increase in senescence in the maternal decidua (the specialized layer of endometrium that forms the base of the placental bed) and in placental cells. This increase in senescence is associated with a gradual physiological increase in DNA damage during gestation. A positive correlation between the gestation period and maximum lifespan was observed across 740 mammalian species. It was postulated that the rates of DNA damage and senescence may impact the gestation period as well as lifespan.

== Non-mammals ==
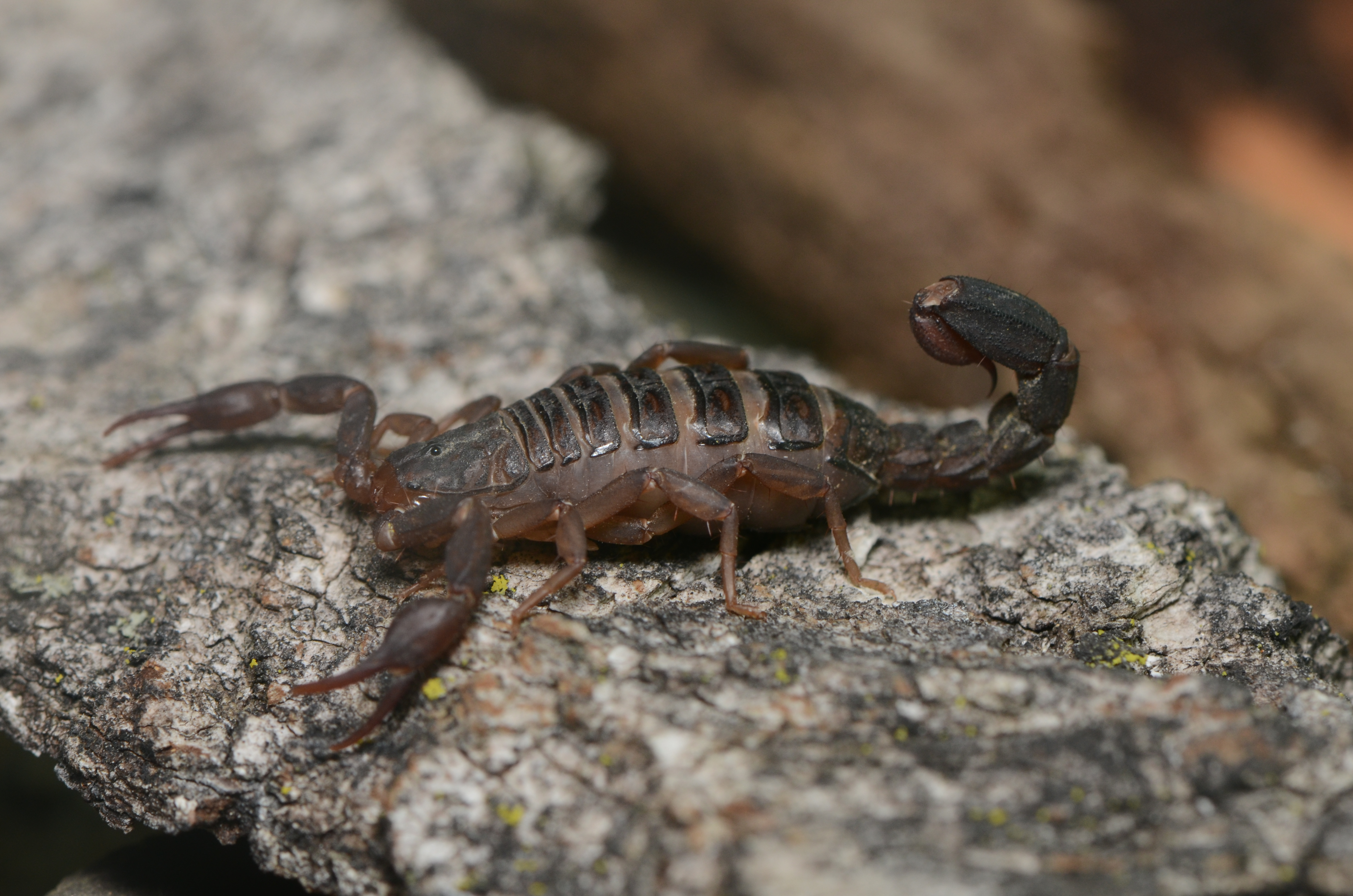
Pregnant scorpion

In viviparous animals, the embryo develops inside the body of the mother, as opposed to outside in an egg (oviparity). The mother then gives live birth. The less developed form of viviparity is called ovoviviparity, in which the mother carries embryos inside eggs. Most vipers exhibit ovoviviparity. The more developed form of viviparity is called placental viviparity; mammals are the best example, but it has also evolved independently in other animals, such as in scorpions, some sharks, and in velvet worms. Viviparous offspring live independently and require an external food supply from birth. Certain lizards also employ this method such as the genera Tiliqua and Corucia. The placenta is attached directly to the mother in these lizards which is called viviparous matrotrophy.

Ovoviviparous animals develop within eggs that remain within the mother's body up until they hatch or are about to hatch. It is similar to viviparity in that the embryo develops within the mother's body. Unlike the embryos of viviparous species, ovoviviparous embryos are nourished by the egg yolk rather than by the mother's body. However, the mother's body does provide gas exchange. The young of ovoviviparous amphibians are sometimes born as larvae, and undergo metamorphosis outside the body of the mother.

The fish family Syngnathidae has the unique characteristic whereby females lay their eggs in a brood pouch on the male's chest, and the male incubates the eggs. Fertilization may take place in the pouch or before implantation in the water. Included in Syngnathidae are seahorses, the pipefish, and the weedy and leafy sea dragons. Syngnathidae is the only family in the animal kingdom to which the term "male pregnancy" has been applied.

== See also ==
- Evolution of mammals (for the evolution of gestation-related features in humans and other mammals)
- Male pregnancy
- Nesting instinct
- Pregnancy
- Pregnancy in fish
- Prenatal development
- Prenatal nutrition and birth weight
