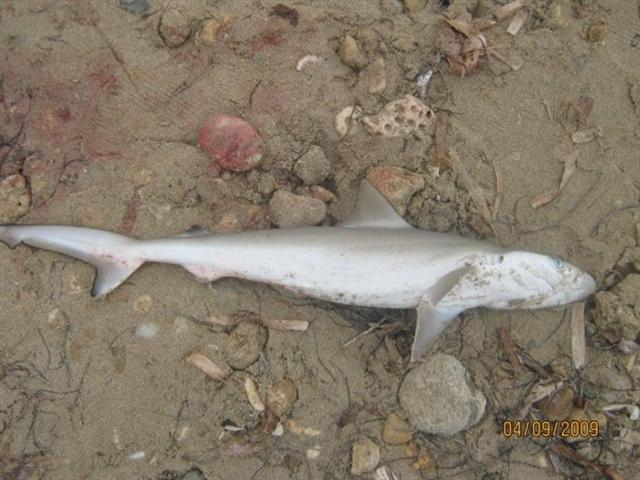

Conservation status
- Vulnerable (IUCN 3.1)

Scientific classification
- Kingdom: Animalia
- Phylum: Chordata
- Class: Chondrichthyes
- Subclass: Elasmobranchii
- Division: Selachii
- Order: Carcharhiniformes
- Family: Carcharhinidae
- Genus: Rhizoprionodon
- Species: R. porosus

Binomial name
- Rhizoprionodon porosus (Poey, 1861)
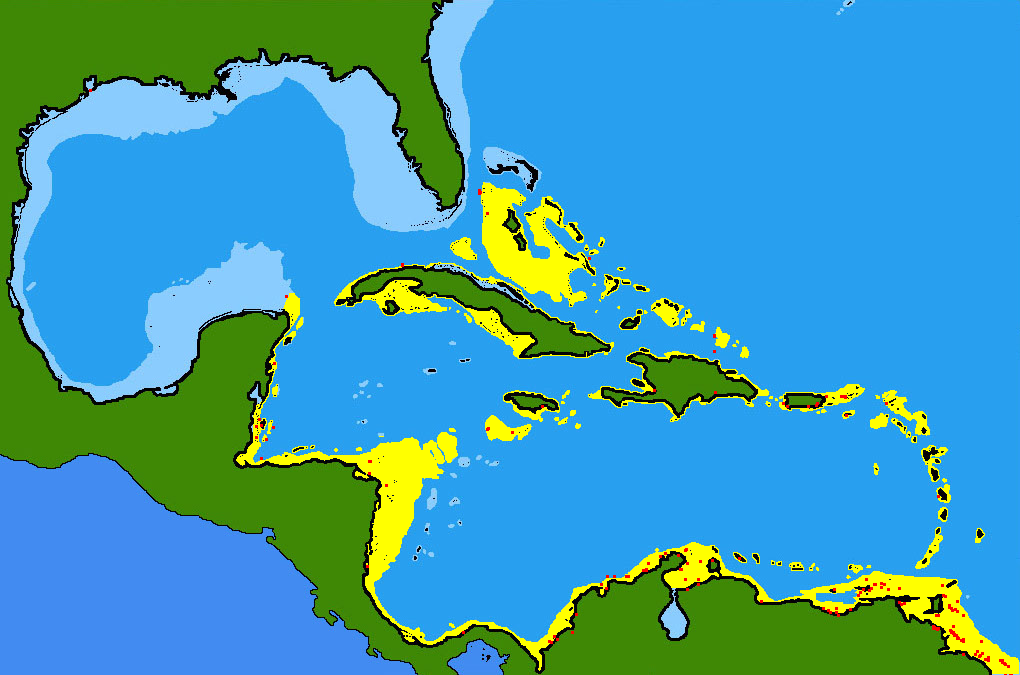

= Caribbean sharpnose shark =

Species of shark

The Caribbean sharpnose shark (Rhizoprionodon porosus) is a requiem shark, and part of the family Carcharhinidae.

== Distribution and habitat ==
It is found in the tropical waters of the western Atlantic Ocean and the Caribbean, between latitudes 28° N and 40° S, from the surface to a depth of 500 m.

== Description ==
The maximum reported size for the Caribbean sharpnose shark is 110 cm (43 in). The average adult size appears to be about 80–89 cm (31.5–35 in). Both sexes seem to reach maturity at about 65–70 cm (25.5–27.5 in) in length, and just over 2 years old. The life span is estimated to be about 8–10 years old.

== Taxonomy ==
The species was once confused as being the same species as the Atlantic sharpnose shark - however difference in vertebra counts indicate that it is a separate species.

== Breeding ==
Reproduction and litter size is similar to those of the Atlantic sharpnose shark.

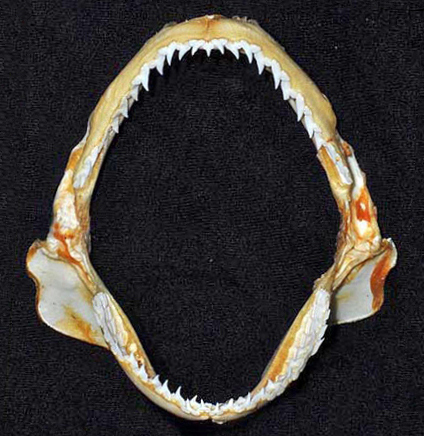
Jaws

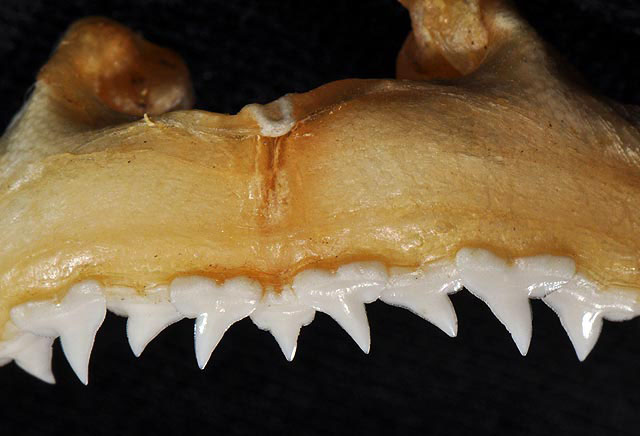
Upper teeth

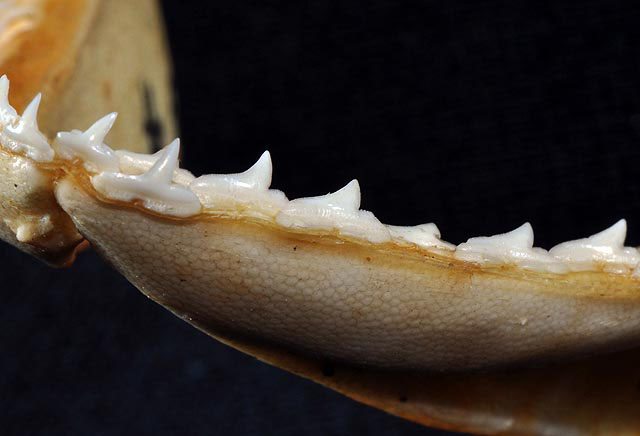
Lower teeth
