= Rhizoprionodon tianshanensis =

Rhizoprionodon tianshanensis Temporal range: Late Eocene (Priabonian), 37 Ma

Scientific classification
- Kingdom: Animalia
- Phylum: Chordata
- Class: Chondrichthyes
- Subclass: Elasmobranchii
- Division: Selachii
- Order: Carcharhiniformes
- Family: Carcharhinidae
- Genus: Rhizoprionodon
- Species: †R. tianshanensis

Binomial name
- †Rhizoprionodon tianshanensis (Li, 1997)

Synonyms
- Eorhincodon tianshanensis Li, 1997

Rhizoprionodon tianshanensis is an extinct species of requiem shark, from the Late Eocene of Xinjiang, China. It was originally described as a whale shark, in the genus Eorhincodon, but was reclassified as a species of Rhizoprionodon.
