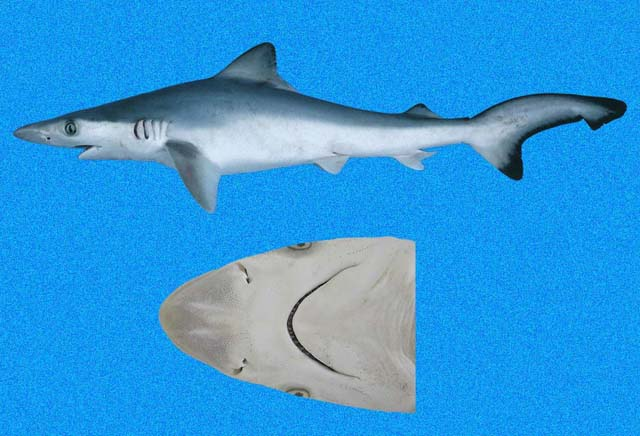

Conservation status
- Vulnerable (IUCN 3.1)

Scientific classification
- Kingdom: Animalia
- Phylum: Chordata
- Class: Chondrichthyes
- Subclass: Elasmobranchii
- Division: Selachii
- Order: Carcharhiniformes
- Family: Carcharhinidae
- Genus: Rhizoprionodon
- Species: R. longurio

Binomial name
- Rhizoprionodon longurio (D. S. Jordan & C. H. Gilbert, 1882)
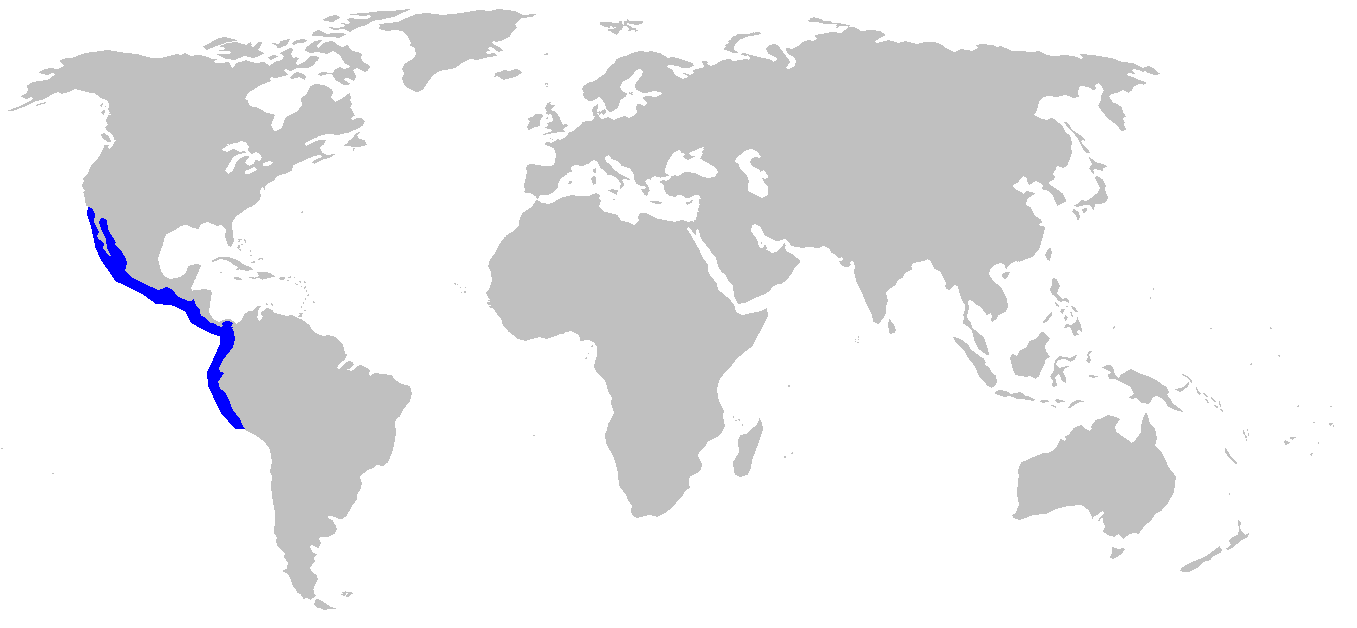

= Pacific sharpnose shark =

Species of shark

The Pacific sharpnose shark (Rhizoprionodon longurio) often migrates along the Pacific coast of Mexico. They are most commonly caught in the artisanal fishery of Mazatlán. When a large sample of Pacific sharpnose sharks were observed scientists concluded that this type of shark was a "viviparous shark of small size which is born at an average length of 31 cm." Their gestation period is between ten and eleven months.

There was found to be no statistical relationship between the number of embryos to the average length as a result of scientific research. Specialists David Corro, Leonardo Castillo Geniz and J. Fernando Marquez-Farias, found that the sex ratio of this specific Shark is one to one with the average number of embryos per female, being around 7.4.

== Habitat and location ==
The Pacific sharpnose shark inhabits the coastal waters of the eastern tropical Pacific Ocean. They can be found from southern California to all the way to Peru (Compagno, 1984). The shark is fished commercially in the Pacific Ocean off Mexico from the Gulf of California to Puerto Madero, Chiapas. The Pacific sharpnose likes muddy bottom areas, however it is not known whether it utilizes coastal lagoons as nursery areas or if it utilizes only open waters.

== Migration ==
During the winter to spring period, the Pacific sharpnose shark has movements of the population from southern Isla Tiburón in the central Gulf of California to the southern region of the state of Nayarit along the eastern shore of the Gulf. From the summer to autumn period, the species moves in the opposite direction, either through the central axis of the Gulf of California or along the Sonora coast line until reaching its place of origin.

== Commercial fishing ==
The catch of Pacific sharpnose sharks in southern Sinaloa is seasonal, from November to April, with the maximum peak in February. This is due to the change of several factors, including sea temperature, which causes a massive movement of the species. It has been found that the species is very susceptible to being caught by gillnets and bottom long lines. Fiberglass boats of 22-25 feet are typically used to catch Pacific sharpnose sharks with a workday of 12 to 24 hours and a crew of 2 to 3 members. Each boat has a capacity of up to 1.5 tons.

== Size ==
It has been found that females typically grow larger than males. In one study, there were two modal groups of adults, one at 96 cm and the other at 108 cm. The maximum length recorded was a female specimen at 129.5 cm.

== Reproduction ==
There are reports of nurseries in the Upper Gulf of California. The reproductive season goes from March to June with a peak in April. It is estimated that the gestation period of Pacific sharpnose is 10-12 months. However, due to the great migratory movements of the species, this estimation was taken without the complete cycle of embryonic growth being observed.

== Diet ==
In one study done with the stomach contents of 82 specimens examined, about 36% of the stomachs were empty. In the sharks with stomach contents, it was found that the diet consisted mainly of crustaceans and fish.
