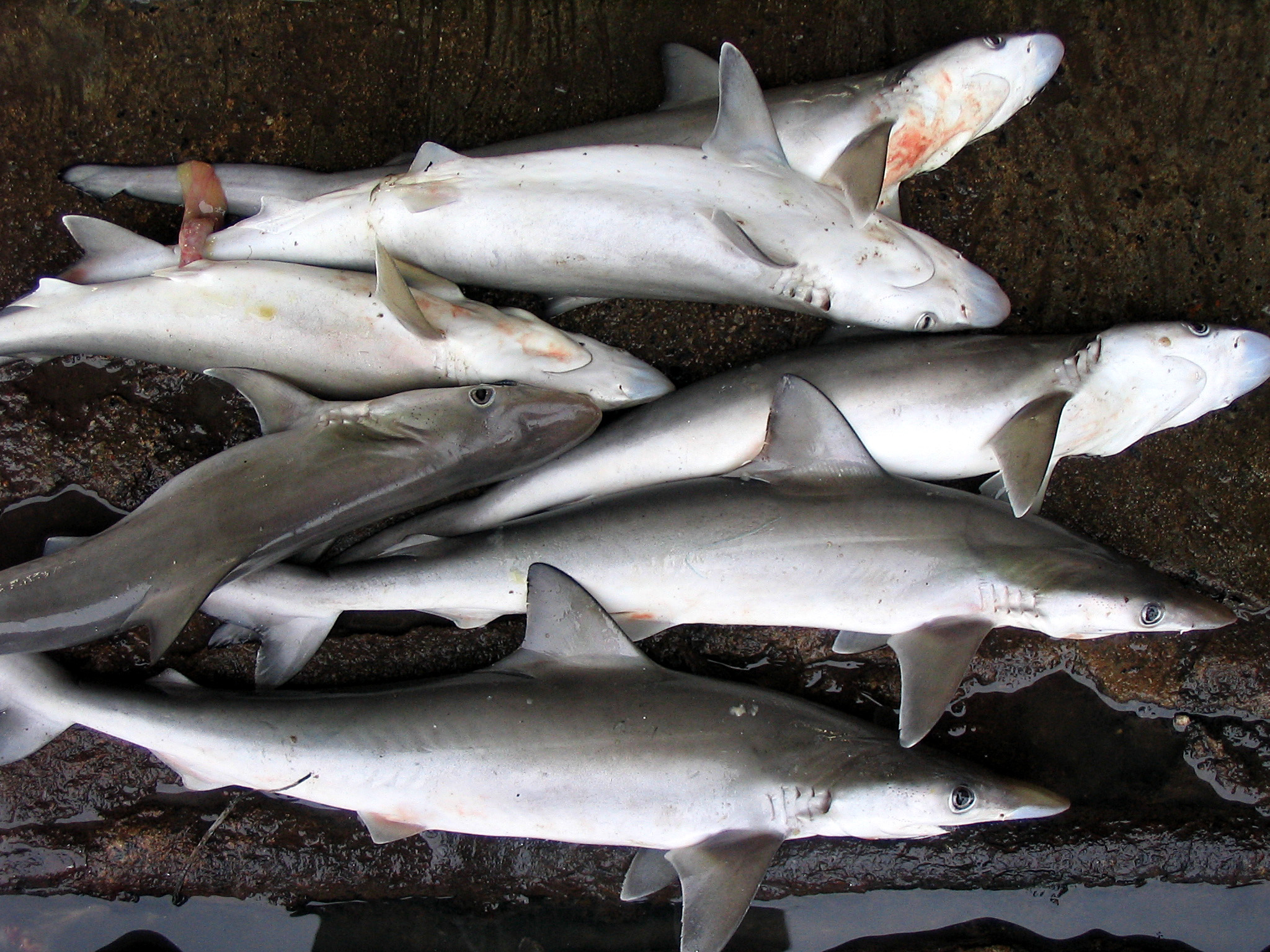
- Milk shark (R. acutus)

Scientific classification
- Kingdom: Animalia
- Phylum: Chordata
- Class: Chondrichthyes
- Subclass: Elasmobranchii
- Division: Selachii
- Order: Carcharhiniformes
- Family: Carcharhinidae
- Genus: Rhizoprionodon; Whitley, 1929

Type species
- Carcharias (Scoliodon) crenidens Klunzinger, 1879

Synonyms
- Eorhincodon Li, 1997; Protozygaena Whitley, 1940; Rhizoprion Ogilby, 1915

= Rhizoprionodon =

Rhizoprionodon Temporal range: 53–0 Ma Early Eocene to Present

Genus of sharks

Rhizoprionodon is a genus of requiem sharks, and part of the family Carcharhinidae, commonly known as sharpnose sharks because of their long, pointed snouts.

== Species ==
- Rhizoprionodon acutus (Rüppell, 1837) (milk shark)
- Rhizoprionodon lalandii (J. P. Müller & Henle, 1839) (Brazilian sharpnose shark)
- Rhizoprionodon longurio (D. S. Jordan & C. H. Gilbert, 1882) (Pacific sharpnose shark)
- Rhizoprionodon oligolinx V. G. Springer, 1964 (grey sharpnose shark)
- Rhizoprionodon porosus (Poey, 1861) (Caribbean sharpnose shark)
- Rhizoprionodon taylori (Ogilby, 1915) (Australian sharpnose shark)
- Rhizoprionodon terraenovae (J. Richardson, 1836) (Atlantic sharpnose shark)
- †Rhizoprionodon tianshanensis (Li, 1997)
- †Rhizoprionodon ficheuri (Joleaud, 1912)
- †Rhizoprionodon ganntourensis (Arambourg, 1952)
- †Rhizoprionodon bisulcatus (Li, 1997)

== See also ==
- List of sharks
- List of prehistoric cartilaginous fish genera
