= Histotrophy =

Form of aplacental viviparity

Histotrophy is a form of matrotrophy exhibited by some live-bearing sharks and rays, in which the developing embryo receives additional nutrition from its mother in the form of uterine secretions, known as histotroph (or "uterine milk"). It is one of the three major modes of elasmobranch reproduction encompassed by "aplacental viviparity", and can be contrasted with yolk-sac viviparity (in which the embryo is solely sustained by yolk) and oophagy (in which the embryo feeds on ova).

There are two categories of histotrophy:

- In mucoid or limited histotrophy, the developing embryo ingests uterine mucus or histotroph as a supplement to the energy supplies provided by its yolk sac. This form of histotrophy is known to occur in the dogfish sharks (Squaliformes) and the electric rays (Torpediniformes), and may be more widespread.
- In lipid histotrophy, the developing embryo is supplied with protein and lipid-enriched histotroph through specialized finger-like structures known as trophonemata. The additional nutrition provided by the enriched histotroph allows the embryo to increase in mass from the egg by several orders of magnitude by the time it is born, much greater than is possible in mucoid histotrophy. This form of histotrophy is found in stingrays and their relatives (Myliobatiformes).
