= Ovoviviparity =

Gestation type

The characteristic quivering abdomen caused by movement of tadpoles within a pregnant female Limnonectes larvaepartus

Ovoviviparity, ovovivipary, ovivipary, internal oviparity, or aplacental viviparity is a "bridging" form of reproduction between egg-laying oviparous and live-bearing viviparous reproduction. Ovoviviparous animals possess embryos that develop inside eggs that remain in the mother's body until they are ready to hatch.

The young of some ovoviviparous amphibians, such as Limnonectes larvaepartus, are born as larvae, and undergo further metamorphosis outside the body of the mother. Members of genera Nectophrynoides and Eleutherodactylus bear froglets, with not only the hatching, but all the most conspicuous metamorphosis, being completed inside the body of the mother before birth.

Among insects that depend on opportunistic exploitation of transient food sources, such as many Sarcophagidae and other carrion flies, and species such as many Calliphoridae, that rely on fresh dung, and parasitoids such as tachinid flies that depend on entering the host as soon as possible, the embryos commonly develop to the first larval instar inside the mother's reproductive tract, and they hatch just before being laid or almost immediately afterwards.

== Ovoviviparity ==
Ovoviviparous animals are those animals that are similar to viviparous species in which there is internal fertilization and the young are born alive, but differ in that there is no placental connection and the unborn young are nourished by egg; the mother's body does provide gas exchange.

In some species, the internally developing embryos rely solely on yolk. This is known as "yolk-sac viviparity" and is regarded as a type of lecithotrophy (no maternal provisioning). Other species exhibit matrotrophy, in which the embryo exhausts its yolk supply early in gestation and the mother provides additional nutrition. This additional provisioning may be in the form of unfertilized eggs (intrauterine oophagy), uterine secretions (histotrophy) or it may be delivered through a placenta. The first two of these modes were categorized under histotroph viviparity, or aplacental viviparity.

== Examples ==
=== Fish ===
In seahorses, zygotes remain in the male's ventral "marsupium".

=== Amphibians ===
The young of ovoviviparous amphibians are sometimes born as larvae, and undergo metamorphosis outside the body of the mother. Modes of reproduction include based on relations between zygote and parents:

- Ovuliparity: external fertilisation, as in arthropods, many bony fishes, and most amphibians
- Oviparity: internal fertilisation, where the female lays zygotes as eggs with important vitellus (typically birds)
- Ovoviviparity can be thought of as a form of oviparity where the zygotes are retained in the female's body or in the male's body, but there are no trophic interactions between zygote and parents. This is found in Anguis fragilis. In the frog Rhinoderma darwinii, the zygotes develop in the vocal sac. In the frog Rheobatrachus, zygotes developed in the stomach.

== Ovolarviparity ==
Some insects, notably tachinid flies, are ovolarviparous, which means that the embryos develop into the first larval stage (instar) within the eggs while still in the female's oviduct. As a result, the larvae hatch more rapidly, sometimes immediately after egg deposition, and can begin feeding right away. A similar phenomenon is larviparity, in which larvae hatch before the female delivers them, although this may be mistakenly identified in species with very thin and transparent egg membranes.

== Criticisms and disuse ==
A lack of a rigidly defined term resulted in widespread misuse of the term ovoviviparity in the biological literature. Ovoviviparity has been used to describe delayed forms of egg-laying reproduction as well as live-bearing species that provide maternal nutrients but do not use a placenta. This widespread misuse of the term has led to confusion over what earlier authors meant when using the name. Modern practice has seen the disuse of ovoviviparity in favour of the more specific definitions of lecithotrophic and matrotrophic oviparity and viviparity.

== See also ==
- En-caul birth
