= Embryotroph =

Nourishment of placental embryos

Embryotroph is the embryonic nourishment in placental animals.

== Formation of syncytiotrophoblast ==
On approximately the seventh day of development, the trophoblast (cells that make up the outer part of the blastocyst) divide to form two separate layers: an inner cytotrophoblast layer, and an outer syncytiotrophoblast layer. Using enzymes, the syncytiotrophoblast penetrates the tissues of the mother, then it attaches to these tissues by burrowing with long projections, breaking maternal blood vessels. The chemical reason why this process occurs is currently unknown.

== Uterine milk ==
Uterine milk is part of the embryotroph. It is a white secretion containing proteins and amino acids that nourishes the embryo during development. The uterine milk is the actual nutritional liquid that feeds the embryo, while the embryotroph is the uterine milk plus the syncytiotrophoblast.

== Malformations and embryotrophic nutrition ==
Studies have shown that when embryotrophic nutrition is interrupted for some reason or another, malformations in embryos tend to occur. This is expected, because when important proteins and amino acids are withheld, the embryo will surely be at a disadvantage. The yolk sac is the part of the embryo most likely to be malformed, leading to other malformations later on.
