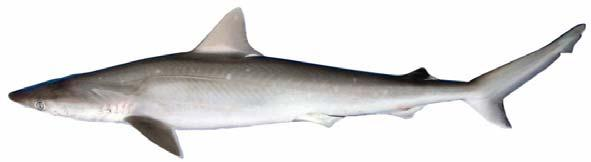

Conservation status
- Least Concern (IUCN 3.1)

Scientific classification
- Kingdom: Animalia
- Phylum: Chordata
- Class: Chondrichthyes
- Subclass: Elasmobranchii
- Division: Selachii
- Order: Carcharhiniformes
- Family: Carcharhinidae
- Genus: Rhizoprionodon
- Species: R. terraenovae

Binomial name
- Rhizoprionodon terraenovae (J. Richardson, 1836)
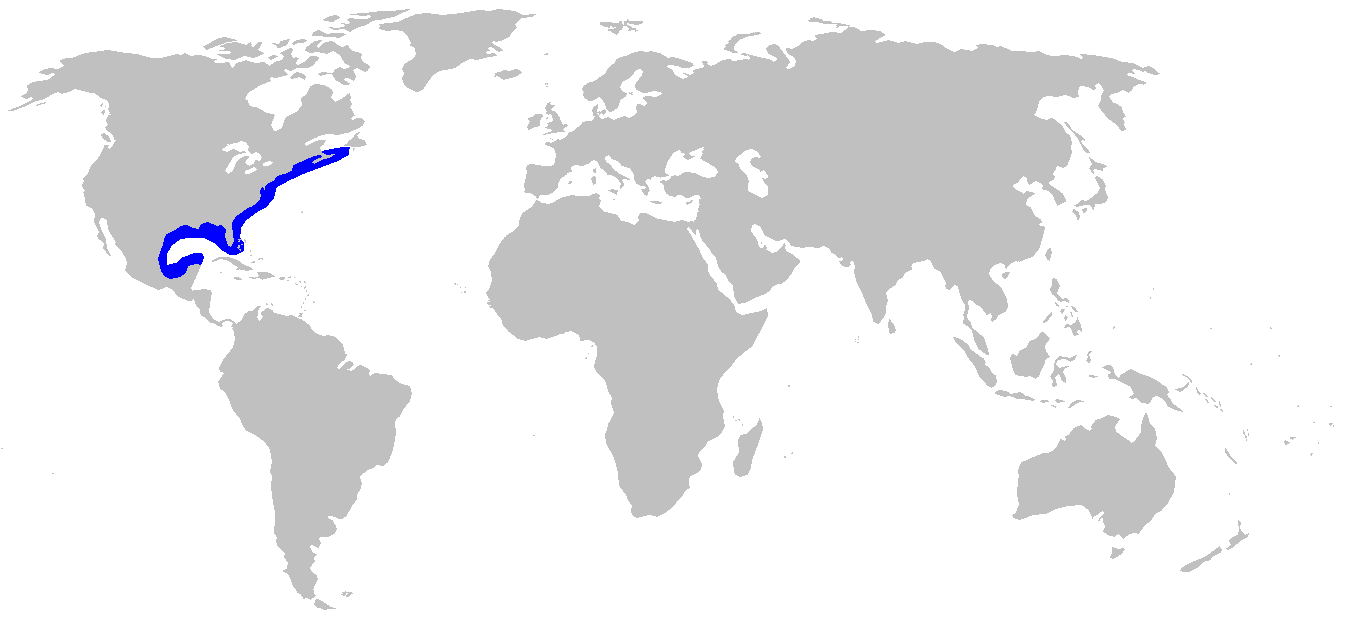
- Range of the Atlantic sharpnose shark

= Atlantic sharpnose shark =

Species of shark

The Atlantic sharpnose shark (Rhizoprionodon terraenovae) is a species of requiem shark in the family Carcharhinidae. It is found in the subtropical waters of the north-western Atlantic Ocean, between latitudes 43°N and 18°N.

== Description ==
The Atlantic sharpnose shark is a small shark in comparison to others. The Atlantic sharpnose shark's maximum species length is known to be about 110–120 cm (3.6–3.9 ft). Although its average adult size tends to be about 91.4–99 cm (3.00–3.25 ft). Reports exist of these sharks living up to 19 years in the wild. A distinctive feature is that juveniles have black edges on the dorsal and caudal fins.

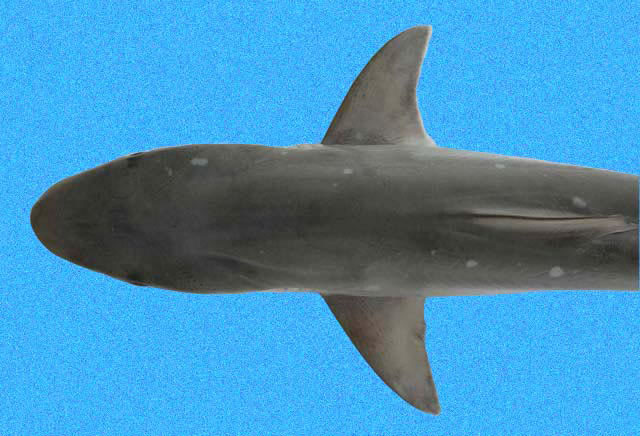
Top view

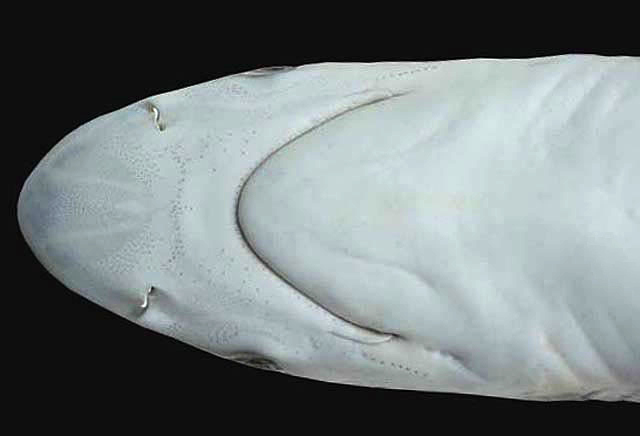
Head, bottom view

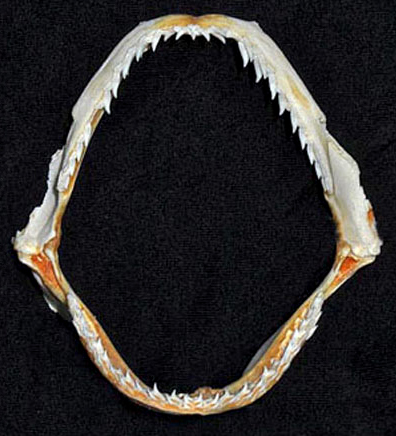
Jaws

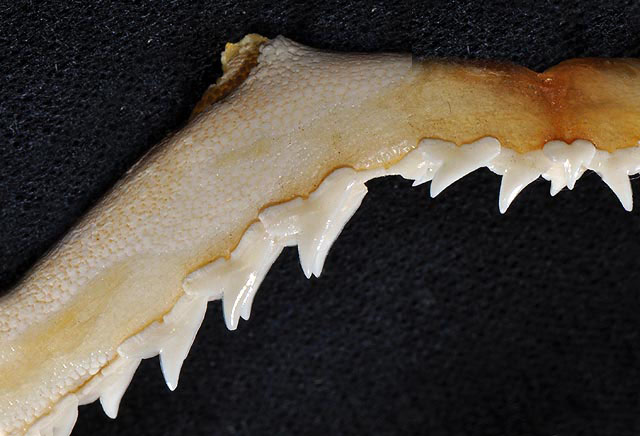
Upper teeth

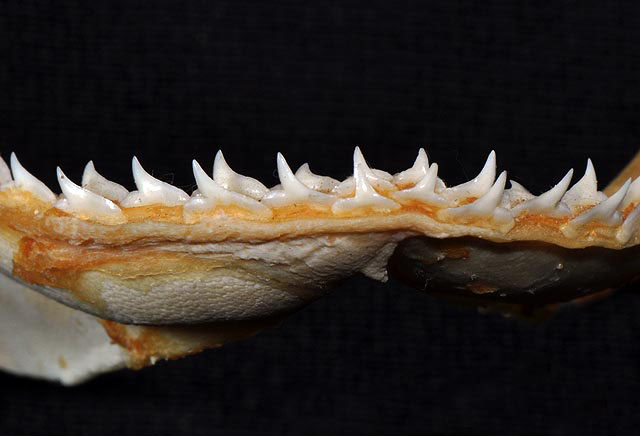
Lower teeth

== Habitat ==
Atlantic sharpnose sharks can be found as far north as New Brunswick, Canada, to as far south as the southern Gulf of Mexico. Reports of specimens from Brazil are likely being confused with the Brazilian sharpnose shark. Atlantic sharpnose sharks prefer to live in warmer, shallow coastal waters. As they are often found in waters less than 10.1 m (33 ft) deep. Although Atlantic sharpnose reportedly were found at 280 m (920 ft) deep.

== Feeding habits ==
The diet of the Atlantic sharpnose sharks mostly consists of bony fish, worms, shrimp, crabs, and mollusks. Commonly consumed fish include menhaden, eels, silversides, wrasses, jacks, toadfish, and filefish.

== Maturation ==
Atlantic sharpnose sharks are born ranging from a length of 29–37 cm (11–15 in). For the first three months after birth, they grow an average of 5 cm (2.0 in) per month. Then, in the winter and spring, the average growth rate decreases to 0.9 cm (0.35 in) per month until the shark reaches a length of 60 to 65 cm (24 to 26 in), in which the shark's growth rate increases linearly about 1.3 cm (0.51 in) per month for about a year. Males mature at the age of 2–3 years at a length of 80–85 cm (31–33 in), while females seem to mature at the age of 2.5–3.5 years old, at a length around 84–89 cm (33–35 in).

== Reproduction ==
Female Atlantic sharpnose sharks are viviparous, and tend to have a litter of four to six pups, but litter size may range from one to seven pups, after a gestation period of 10–11 months. The pups are usually born at between 29 and 37 cm (11 and 15 in) in total length. Females are found in the marine estuaries during the late spring, but they breed mostly throughout the year.

== Captivity ==
Generally, Atlantic sharpnose sharks are better suited for public aquaria, or very experienced private shark aquarists who are capable of caring for them. These sharks are highly active swimmers and require ample space. Also, these sharks tend to do best in small schools of at least three sharks. Tanks or ponds which are round or oval-shaped are best suited for these sharks. They have been reported to live at least 4 years in captivity.
