= Matrotrophy =

Form of maternal care during embryo development

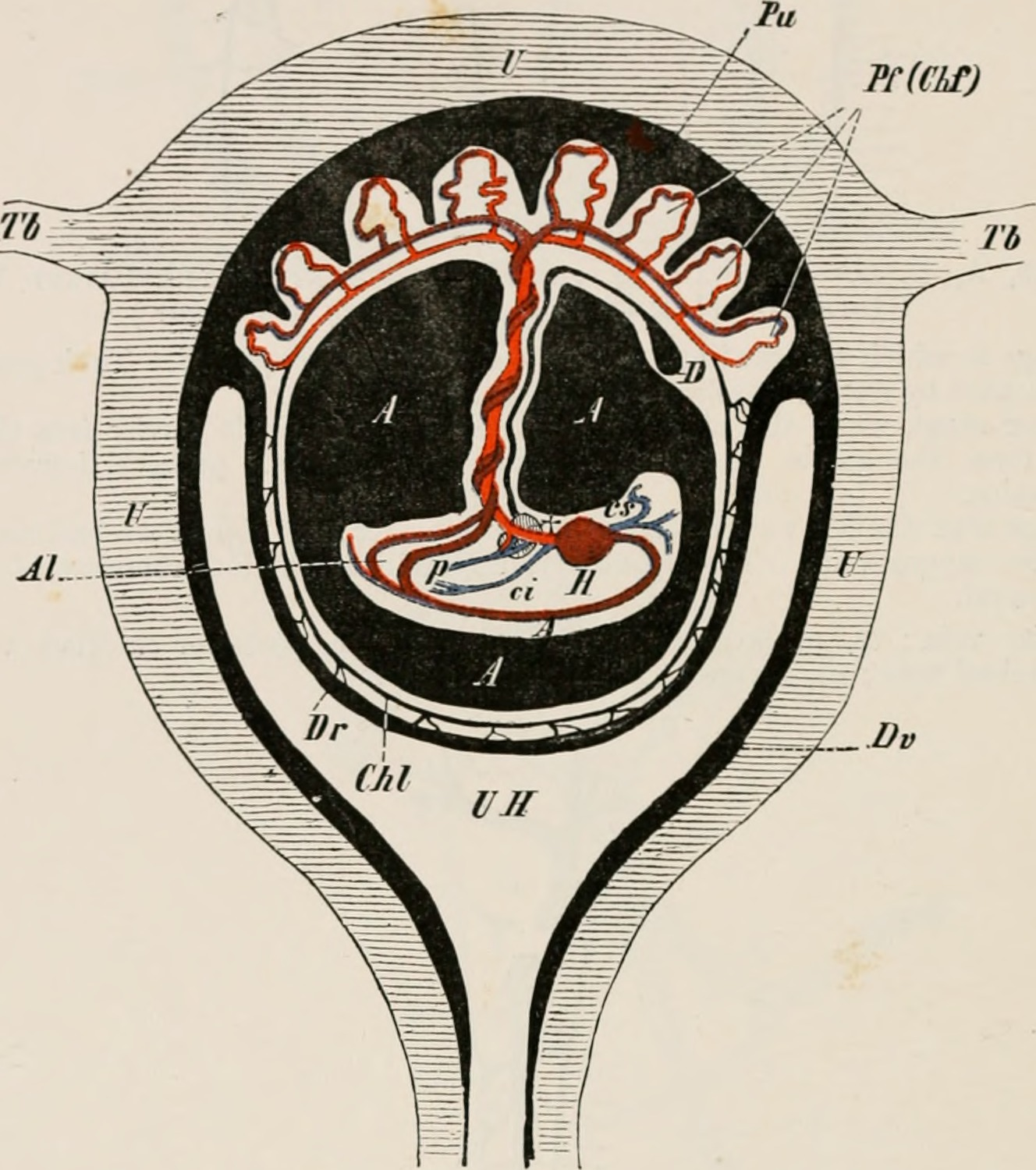
A mammal embryo (centre) is attached by its umbilical cord to a placenta (top), through which the mother provides food to the embryo while it is in her uterus.

Matrotrophy is a form of maternal care during organism development, associated with live birth (viviparity), in which the embryo of an animal or flowering plant is supplied with additional nutrition from the mother (e.g. through a placenta). This can be contrasted with lecithotrophy, in which the only source of nutrition for the embryo is yolk originally contained within its egg.

== Vegetal matrotrophy ==
In plants, matrotrophy is considered a critical evolutionary development preceding the origin of embryophytes and therefore essential to the evolution of land plants. Matrotrophy is facilitated by cytological and ultrastructural modifications on one or both sides of the generational junction, a region called the placenta. Specialization of the placental cells pertains further to their cytological and ultrastructural characteristics: the cytoplasm is often dense and rich in lipids, the vacuole is typically reduced but large in Sphagnum, the endoplasmic reticulum extensive, mitochondria numerous and large, chloroplasts numerous, often less differentiated, rich in lipid-filled globuli and sometimes filled with starch.

== Animal matrotrophy ==
While commonly associated with vertebrates and especially mammals, matrotrophy is found in 21 of 34 animal phyla, and is fairly common in 11 of those. It has arisen independently in more than 150 clades within Chordata and in more than 140 clades amongst invertebrates.

== See also ==
- Pregnancy (fish)
