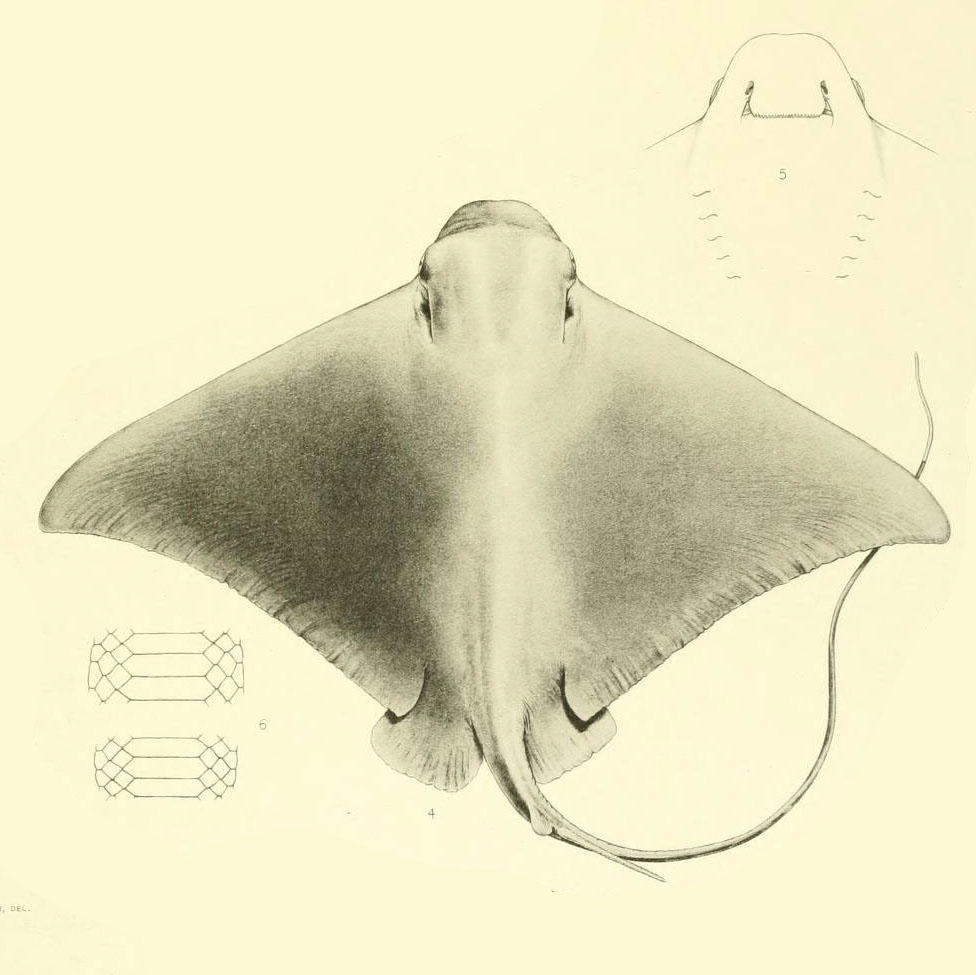

Conservation status
- Vulnerable (IUCN 3.1)

Scientific classification
- Kingdom: Animalia
- Phylum: Chordata
- Class: Chondrichthyes
- Subclass: Elasmobranchii
- Order: Myliobatiformes
- Family: Myliobatidae
- Genus: Myliobatis
- Species: M. peruvianus

Binomial name
- Myliobatis peruvianus Garman, 1913

= Peruvian eagle ray =

Species of fish

The Peruvian eagle ray (Myliobatis peruvianus) is a species of fish in the family Myliobatidae. It is found in the Pacific Ocean off Chile and Peru. It can be differentiated from the similar Chilean eagle ray (M. chilensis) by color and rostral fin form. The ray has not been extensively studied, and is ranked as Data Deficient by the IUCN. It has been recorded only in the open ocean, but is considered likely to be a benthic feeder. It is thought by scientists to be similar to other myliobatids in terms of biology, habits, and threats.
