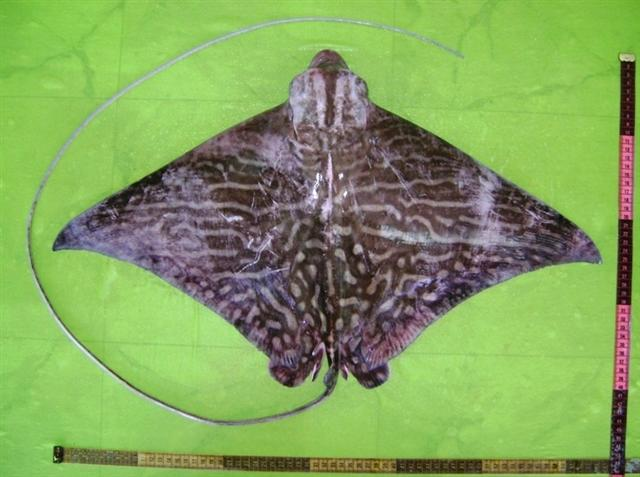

Conservation status
- Endangered (IUCN 3.1)

Scientific classification
- Kingdom: Animalia
- Phylum: Chordata
- Class: Chondrichthyes
- Subclass: Elasmobranchii
- Order: Myliobatiformes
- Family: Myliobatidae
- Genus: Aetomylaeus
- Species: A. maculatus

Binomial name
- Aetomylaeus maculatus (J. E. Gray, 1832)

= Mottled eagle ray =

Species of fish

The mottled eagle ray (Aetomylaeus maculatus) is a species of fish/pelagic rays in the family Myliobatidae. It is native to the Indo-Pacific area. The population of this animal is thought to be in the thousands, though how many are found in distinct areas can be variable.

== Description ==
The mottled eagle ray can grow up to 78 cm in disc width. Little is known about this species, but based on similar species it is expected to produce an average of four offspring per year. It has an exceptionally long spineless tail which is over six times longer than the body. You do want to be cautious when handling this creature despite it being harmless to humans, because of the sharp spine near the base of its long tail.

Mottled Eagle Rays have a very distinct pattern on their backs, making it very hard to miss them if spotted. This pattern consists of various striped and patches. It has a wide, diamond-shaped body with pointed fins on the side. It is usually dark copper or black in color on top and usually white on the ventral side. They rely on a very fast wing-flapping motion for locomotion. This is called pectoral fin oscillation.

== Range ==
It is found in China, India, Indonesia, Malaysia, Singapore, Sri Lanka, Taiwan, and Thailand. Its natural habitats are open seas, shallow seas, subtidal aquatic beds, and estuarine waters. It is quite rare in Taiwan and Vietnam. It inhabits shoreline waters that have soft sand and up to 60 meters deep.

== Naming and Etymology ==
This species was first described in 1834 by John Edward Gray as Myliobatus maculatus. The current accepted name is Aetomylaeus maculatus.

Older or alternative names that are now considered synonyms or misspellings are as follows:

- Myliobatis cyclura
- Myliobatis macroptera
- Myliobates oculeus
- Aetomylus maculatus (now considered a missplelling).

The Genus Aetomylaeus was thought to include a fourth species (Pteromylaeus), but more recent research on the group shows that they're really closely related enough to be considered the same species. This genus includes the Mottled Eagle Ray and 6 other closely related eagle ray species.

The species was officially added to the World Register of Marine Species (WoRMS) in 2002. After that, its classification has been reviewed and updated over time, with the most recent edits being made in 2008. To date, no other updates in its classification have been made.

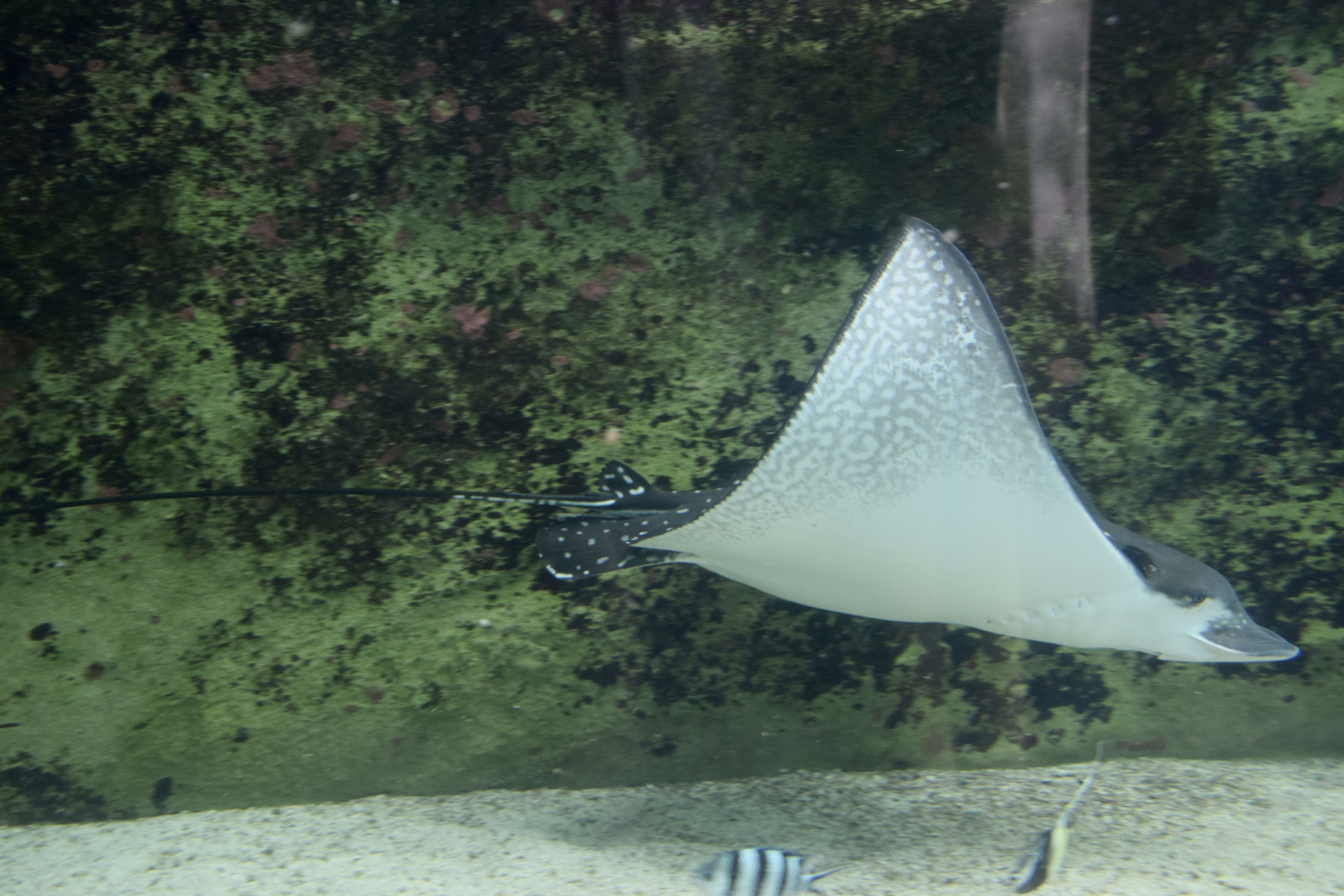
An Ocellated Eagle Ray

== Habitat and Distribution ==
This ray is naturally very rare and sticks to specific spots on the ocean floor. Most fisherman and divers often find the animal cruising over soft sandy bottoms along the coastal area. It also likes to hang out in quieter places like mangrove creeks and more shallow protected areas that don't go much deeper than 18 meters. Almost all of the Eagle Ray species tend to be found in the same area of the Western-Indian Ocean, Eastern Central Pacific Ocean, etc.

In New Caledonia, you'll find two types of eagle rays from the Myliobatidae family. There are the Spotted eagle ray (Aetobatus narinari) and the Mottled Eagle Ray (Aetomylaeus). The Mottled Eagle Ray is much rarer.

== Diet ==
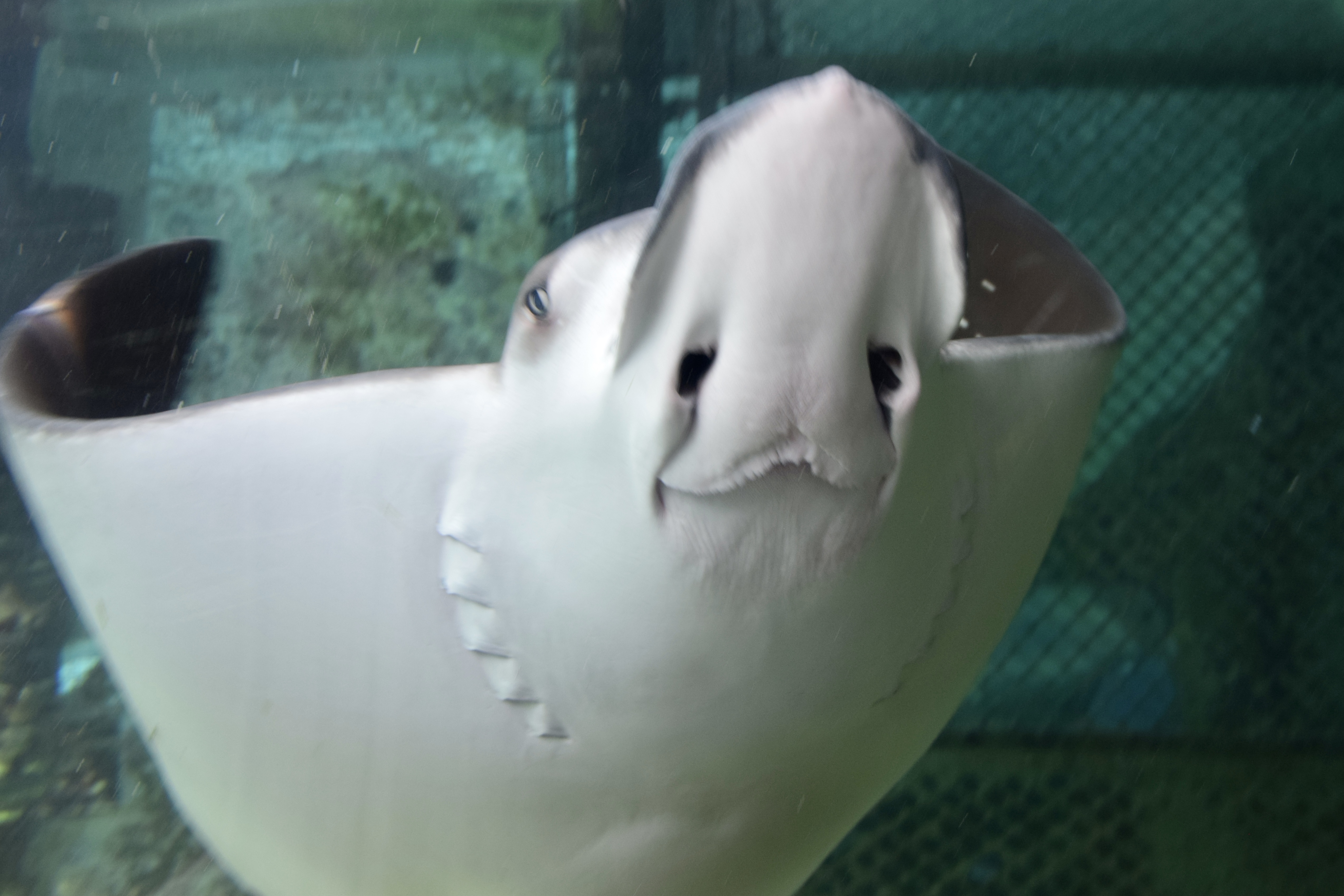
Ocellated Eagle Ray—the size of its snout that is helpful for eating.

The feeding habits of this animal are similar to that of other eagle rays in the ocean. They feed on small creatures that live on or near the seafloor—eating mostly Crustacean, mollusks, and other invertebrates. They find these animals by using their snouts to dig up through the sand.

This species exhibits ovoviviparity (or aplacental viviparity). This means that the embryos don't rely on a placenta. Instead, they start by feeding on their yolk sac. This is so they get the extra nourishment from their mother by absorbing a nutrient-rich uterine fluid through special structures.

== Threats ==
The Mottled Eagle Ray is in lots of trouble because of the way people fish in its home waters and original habitat. This fish is mainly caught as bycatch in fishing nets. Commonly in fishing, almost every method used—like dragging huge nets along the seafloor or setting up nets that trap every organism in its path—catches these animals by accident. Instead of throwing them back into the ocean, fisherman often sell them at markets. Therefore lowering the population. Many people have found them caught in various fishing nets around the ocean, like in trawls and trammel nets, for example.

This animal is in the most danger in the areas near the East and South China Seas, where fishing is so prevalent that populations of this species have crashed by over 70%, therefore leaving natives to those areas relying on smaller fish in their catches. There isn't much of a safe refuge for these animals because fishing continues to occur throughout its entire range. Recreational anglers very often target it simply for the sport aspect, but most of the release it after catching.

To help in the conservation efforts of this animal, you can choose to switch to more sustainable seafood options. Other general options would be to overall conserve more water and lower the amount of water runoff.

== Conservation ==
The assessment year from the IUCN was 2020, when it was assessed as endangered. The original classification of the Mottled Eagle Ray as an endangered species (A2d) was made due to the estimated 50-79% reduction in its population over the past 3 decades/3 generation lengths.

Very minuscule regulations have been put into place in areas near the East and South China Seas to lower the percentages of a reduction in the populations, but the enforcement is weak. Illegal fishing is also an important factor to this issue, and adds to the strain.
