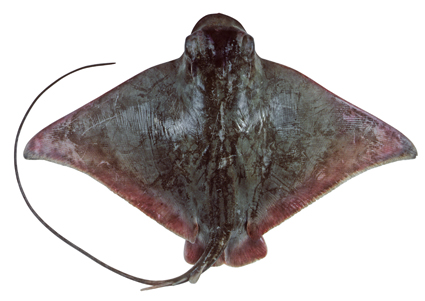

Conservation status
- Near Threatened (IUCN 3.1)

Scientific classification
- Kingdom: Animalia
- Phylum: Chordata
- Class: Chondrichthyes
- Subclass: Elasmobranchii
- Order: Myliobatiformes
- Family: Myliobatidae
- Genus: Myliobatis
- Species: M. hamlyni

Binomial name
- Myliobatis hamlyni J. D. Ogilby, 1911

= Purple eagle ray =

Species of fish

The purple eagle ray (Myliobatis hamlyni) is a species of fish in the family Myliobatidae. It was formerly considered endemic to Australia but is now known to be more widespread. Its natural habitat is the open seas where it has a patchy distribution, and the International Union for Conservation of Nature has assessed its conservation status as being "near-threatened".

== Taxonomy ==
The purple eagle ray was first described in 1911 by the Australian ichthyologist James Douglas Ogilby as Myliobatis hamlyni, being named in honour of his friend, the entomologist Ronald Hamlyn-Harris, who was director of the Queensland Museum from 1910 to 1917. This eagle ray was originally thought to be endemic to eastern Australia, with other records from the region being ascribed to the closely related Japanese eagle ray (Myliobatis tobijei). However a redescription of both species in 2016, including a molecular analysis, indicated that previous records from Western Australia, Indonesia, the Philippines, Taiwan and Japan most likely referred to the purple eagle ray rather than the Japanese eagle ray.

== Description ==
The purple eagle ray is a medium-sized species. The disc is diamond-shaped and the pectoral fins are very large and wing-like, the front edge being straight or slightly convex. The slender, whip-like tail has one or two long stinging spines at its base and has a distinctive fold on its ventral surface. There are seven rows of teeth in each jaw, the central one being the largest. An averaged sized adult has a disc-width of 540 mm (21 in), a length of 200 mm (8 in) and a tail of 250 mm (10 in). The largest males in Indonesia had a disc width of 800 mm (31 in), while the females a disc width of 1,140 mm (45 in). The dorsal surface is a uniform purplish-brown or greenish-brown without dark spotting, and the ventral surface is whitish.

== Distribution and habitat ==
This fish occurs in the tropical and subtropical west Pacific Ocean; its exact range is unclear but includes Australia, Indonesia, the Philippines, Taiwan and Okinawa (Japan). It is a deep-water species with a patchy distribution and is rarely brought to the surface with fishing gear. Its habitat is the open sea, mostly the outer continental shelf and the upper part of the continental slope at depths of between 117 and 330 m (400 and 1,100 ft).

== Status ==
Fishing is the greatest threat to the species, but it is only in Australia and Taiwan that it is often seen among the catch; in Indonesia and other areas, fishing pressure on this fish is relatively low. Overall, the International Union for Conservation of Nature has assessed its conservation status as being "near-threatened".
