= Myliobatis bothriodon =

Myliobatis bothriodon Temporal range: 48.6–40.4 Ma

Scientific classification
- Kingdom: Animalia
- Phylum: Chordata
- Class: Chondrichthyes
- Subclass: Elasmobranchii
- Order: Myliobatiformes
- Family: Myliobatidae
- Genus: Myliobatis
- Species: †M. bothriodon

Binomial name
- †Myliobatis bothriodon White, 1926

Species of extinct eagle ray

Myliobatis bothriodon is a species of extinct eagle ray that lived for 8.2 million years. It only has one occurrence, which was in Nigeria during the Eocene epoch. The specimen was found in a Lutetian marine horizon.
