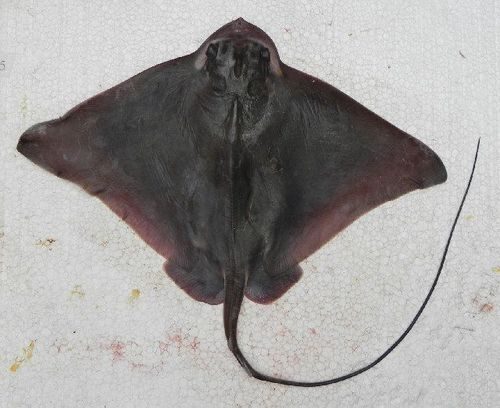
- Southern eagle ray (Myliobatis goodei)

Conservation status
- Vulnerable (IUCN 3.1)

Scientific classification
- Kingdom: Animalia
- Phylum: Chordata
- Class: Chondrichthyes
- Subclass: Elasmobranchii
- Order: Myliobatiformes
- Family: Myliobatidae
- Genus: Myliobatis
- Species: M. goodei

Binomial name
- Myliobatis goodei Garman, 1885

= Southern eagle ray =

Species of cartilaginous fish

The southern eagle ray (Myliobatis goodei), sometimes known as the southern eagle fish or the rockfish, is a ray species in the family Myliobatidae. It lives in waters just off of the Atlantic coast, from the tip of Florida down to Argentina, inhabiting estuaries or bays to give birth during spring and summer and migrating to the open sea in autumn and winter. It has an average width of 99 centimeters, and a length of 60 centimeters. It is often confused with the bullnose ray, a related species in the genus Myliobatis, due to the two species' similarities in appearance.

== Taxonomy ==
Samuel Garman described the southern eagle ray in 1885.

== Distribution and habitat ==
The southern eagle ray lives on various parts of the Atlantic coast. Sightings have been reported from the coast of Southern Mexico all the way down to Argentina, as well as on the coast of Florida. The specific countries that the Southern eagle ray is native to are Argentina, Belize, Brazil, Colombia, Costa Rica, French Guiana, Guyana, Honduras, Mexico, Nicaragua, Panama, Suriname, United States, Uruguay, and Venezuela. A sighting was also reported in the island of Maldives in August 2012, and then three more were reported in Australia.

The southern eagle ray lives in shallow waters, mostly under 100 meters, but it can live in depths of up to 200 meters. This is a significant contrast from the bullnose ray, which most commonly lives in depths of no more than 10 meters. It is benthopelagic, feeding in and inhabiting the areas just above the ocean floor, typically in brackish water. It prefers waters with a soft seabed, composed of elements such as mud, sand, or sea grass.

== Description ==
The southern eagle ray's average length is 80 cm (31.5 in), but some specimens have reached up to 125 cm (49 in). The species is somewhat wider than it is long, with its disc being an average of 99 cm (39 in) wide. It does not have spines on its disc. The southern eagle ray usually has a dark brown colored upper side, while most of its underside is a light shade of brown or white, with the outer edges often being darker.

=== Comparison with the bullnose ray ===
The southern eagle ray's appearance is similar to that of the bullnose ray, causing the two to often be confused. The following table shows the similarities and differences between the two related species:

	M. goodei (Southern eagle ray)	M. freminvillei (bullnose ray)
Image		
Dorsal fin	Located well behind the pelvic fin	Located close to the pelvic fin
Disc	Rounded corners	Sharper corners
Tail	Thin, roughly the same length as its disc	Thin, roughly the same length as its disc
Average width of disc	About 100 cm	Less than 90 cm
Average length of disc	About 80 cm	About 70 cm

== Behavior ==
The southern eagle ray is a carnivore, mostly feeding on small invertebrates, such as shrimp, crabs, and gastropods.

The southern eagle ray migrates seasonally. Adults inhabit the open sea during the autumn and winter, and return to their home location, which is usually an estuary or a bay, in the spring and summer, to give birth. The young that are born in summer usually wait until the end of the next summer before they migrate into the open waters, while those who are born in spring do this after the first summer passes. They then return to their home location again in the spring and summer to give birth themselves. Little else is known about the ecology and reproduction of the southern eagle ray.

== Reproduction ==
The southern eagle ray exhibits ovoviviparity, meaning that the eggs remain inside the mother's body until they are ready to hatch. Embryos feed on yolk when they are first developed. As they develop further, they start receiving nourishment by absorbing uterine fluid from their mother instead.

== Population, conservation, and status ==
The southern eagle ray is a rather common species, much more abundant than the bullnose ray. The species is caught by fisheries, sometimes intentionally but often as a bycatch. IUCN currently lists it as vulnerable. There are currently no conservation measures in place for this species.

The southern eagle ray is often caught intentionally in fishing nets by artisanal fisheries. It is also quite often a bycatch component for trawl fisheries, especially in Caribbean South America and parts of Brazil. It is thought that this may eventually lead to its population declining in certain regions. It is also commonly caught in Venezuela, most often as a bycatch component. The number of reported catches of this species in Venezuela has increased greatly over the years, particularly throughout the 1980s and 1990s. The Southern eagle ray is also a common bycatch of various fisheries in southern Brazil, due to intensive fishing activities. Other batoids are commonly caught in this area as well. Although the intensive fishing has caused a significant decline in many batoid species, it is unknown how this affects eagle rays.

== Parasites ==
The southern eagle ray has several parasites that infect it.

- Aberrapex arrhynchum
- Aberrapex ludmilae
- Aberrapex sanmartini
- Acanthobothrium sp.
- Caulobothrium ostrowskiae
- Caulobothrium uruguayensis
- Halysioncum megacanthum
- Mecistobothrium oblongum
- Parachristianella damiani
- Phyllobothrium myliobatidis
