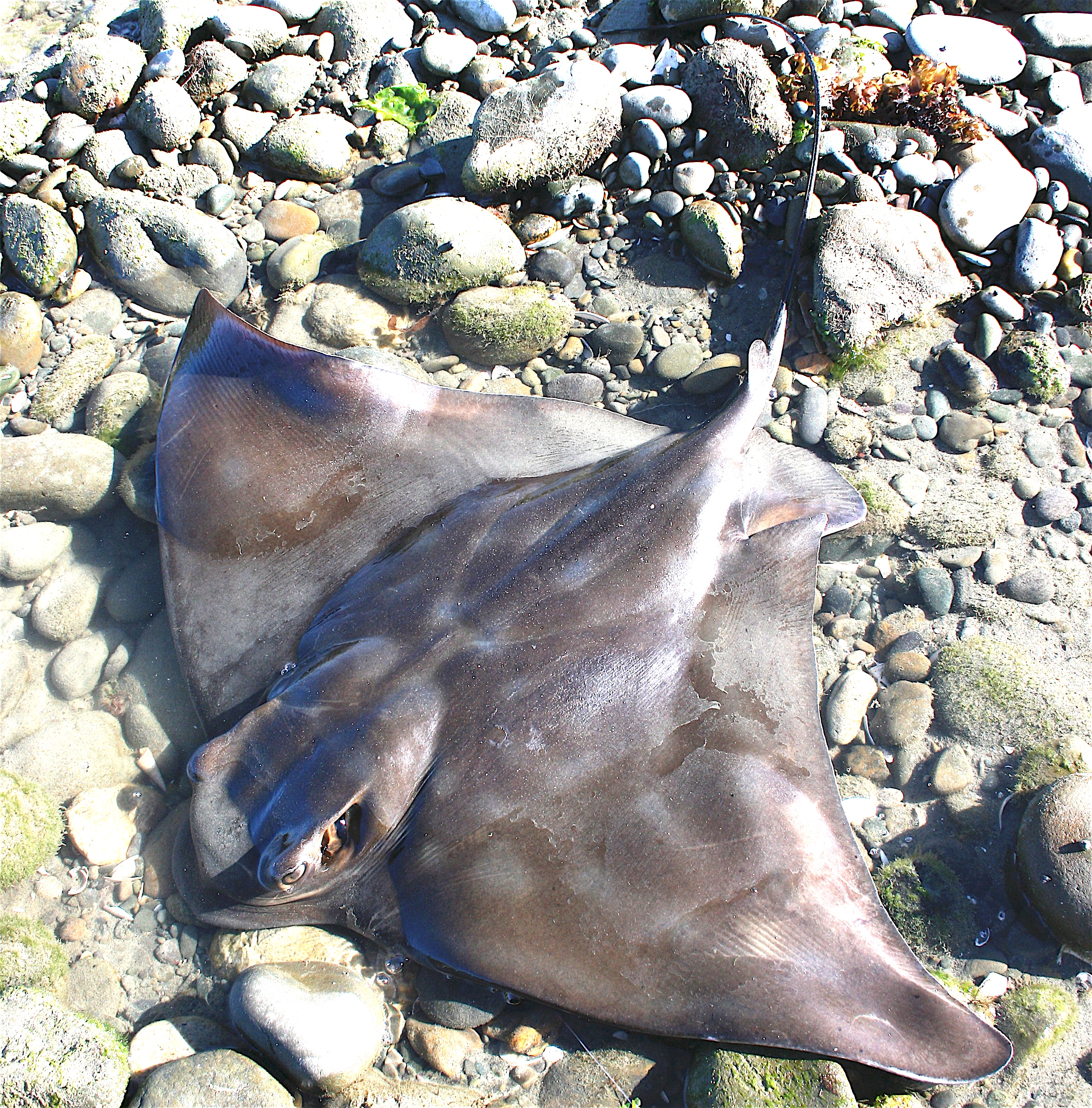

Conservation status
- Least Concern (IUCN 3.1)

Scientific classification
- Kingdom: Animalia
- Phylum: Chordata
- Class: Chondrichthyes
- Subclass: Elasmobranchii
- Order: Myliobatiformes
- Family: Myliobatidae
- Genus: Myliobatis
- Species: M. tenuicaudatus

Binomial name
- Myliobatis tenuicaudatus Hector, 1877

Synonyms
- Myliobatis australis

= New Zealand eagle ray =

Species of cartilaginous fish

The New Zealand eagle ray or Australian eagle ray (Myliobatis tenuicaudatus) is an eagle ray of the family Myliobatidae, found in bays, estuaries, and near rocky reefs around New Zealand and southern Australia on the inner continental shelf. It is a common species and the International Union for Conservation of Nature has assessed its conservation status as being of "least concern".

== Taxonomy ==
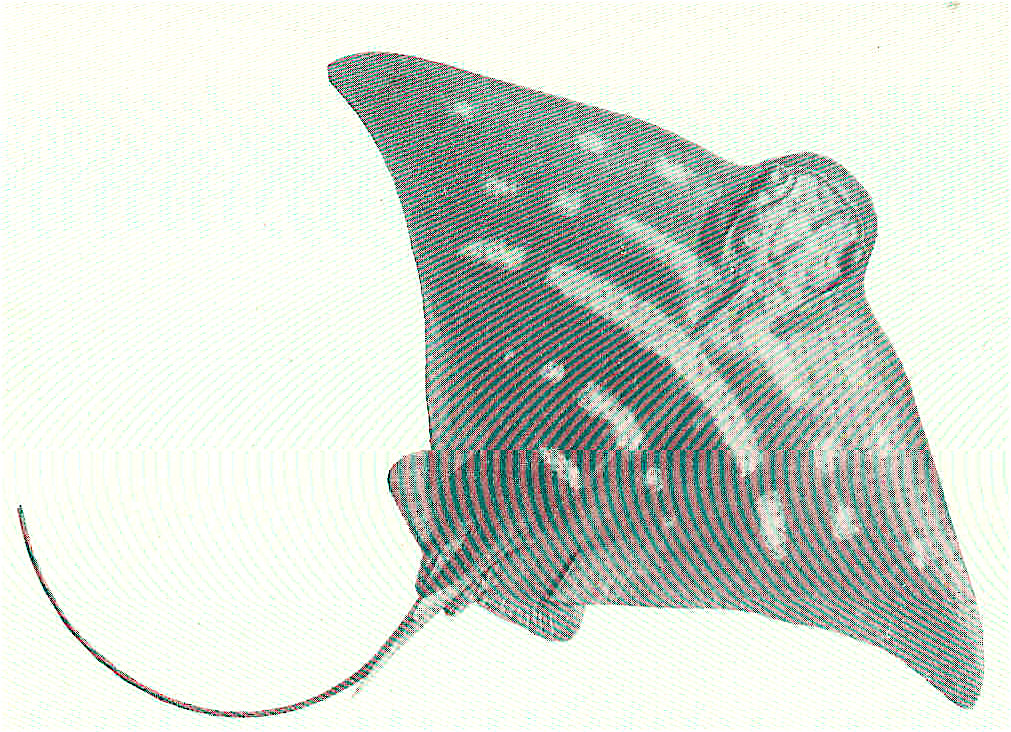

Myliobatis tenuicaudatus was first described in 1877 by the Scottish naturalist James Hector, who was director of the geological survey of New Zealand; the fish was thought to be endemic to New Zealand. Subsequently, in 1881, the Australian zoologist William John Macleay described Myliobatis australis from the waters of Southern Australia as a new species. In a generic revision in 2014, W.T. White determined that the two are synonymous, and that M. australis is a junior synonym of M. tenuicaudatus.

== Description ==
The New Zealand eagle ray is a cartilaginous fish with a roughly circular, disc-like body, a projecting, frog-like head, large, fleshy pectoral fins, and a long tail armed with a spine that is capable of injecting venom. The pectoral fins beat up and down so that the fish appears to "fly" through the water. This fish can grow to a maximum width of about 150 cm (60 in), with females being rather larger than males. The dorsal surface is olive-green, dark brown, or yellowish, with grey or pale blue markings, and the ventral surface is white.

== Distribution ==
This ray is native to the waters around both North and South Island in New Zealand, the Kermadec Islands, Norfolk Island, and southern Australia, where it occurs off Queensland, New South Wales, Victoria, Tasmania, South Australia, and Western Australia. It is usually found on the inner continental shelf, on sandy flats and seagrass meadows, in estuaries and bays, and near rocky reefs. It is usually in shallow water, but has been found as deep as 422 m (1,380 ft).

== Ecology ==
A benthopelagic species, it feeds on such invertebrates as clams, oysters, crabs, and worms that it finds on or under the seabed. The prey is crushed with the teeth and the hard fragments rejected. By means of electrosensory organs ampullae of lorenzini on the head, it is able to detect prey completely submerged in sand or mud; a jet of water is blown out of the mouth and/or gill slits, exposing the mollusc or other prey. This process leaves a deep, steep-sided pit, which may be as much as 30 cm (12 in) across, and these pits can often be seen on sandflats in New Zealand. Pits can be found year-round, although are more common in the summer and autumn.

M. tenuicaudatus exhibits matrotrophy, with embryos feeding initially on yolk, then gaining additional nourishment from uterine fluids, before live birth. Litter sizes vary between two and 20, with an average of six young. They are usually 20 to 30 cm (8 to 12 in) across the disc at birth.

== Status ==
M. tenuicaudatus is a common species and is sometimes caught as bycatch in coastal fisheries. Traditionally, such caught fish have mostly been discarded, but they are sometimes retained for human consumption. The fish seem capable of recovering when released, and numbers of fish are generally fairly stable. This fish is present in a number of marine protected areas, and the International Union for Conservation of Nature has assessed its conservation status as being of "least concern". In June 2018, the New Zealand Department of Conservation classified the New Zealand eagle ray as "not threatened" with the qualifiers "data poor" and "secure overseas" under the New Zealand Threat Classification System.
