= Longnose eagle ray =

Conservation status
- Vulnerable (IUCN 3.1)

Scientific classification
- Kingdom: Animalia
- Phylum: Chordata
- Class: Chondrichthyes
- Subclass: Elasmobranchii
- Order: Myliobatiformes
- Family: Myliobatidae
- Genus: Myliobatis
- Species: M. longirostris

Binomial name
- Myliobatis longirostris Applegate & Fitch, 1964

Species of fish

The longnose eagle ray or snouted eagle ray (Myliobatis longirostris) is a species of fish in the family Myliobatidae. It is found in the East Pacific Ocean from Baja California and the Gulf of California to Sechura, Peru, ranging from shallow water to a depth of 64 m (210 ft). This species was first described in 1964 by American ichthyologist Shelton Pleasants Applegate, who was an expert on fossil and living sharks, and American marine biologist John Edgar Fitch.

== Distribution and habitat ==
The longnose eagle ray is native to tropical and warm, temperate waters in the east-central Pacific Ocean, ranging from Mexico to Peru. It occurs on the continental shelf from the surface down to about 64 m (210 ft).

== Biology ==
Very little is known about these fish, their behaviour, or ecology. They reach sexual maturity at a disc diameter around 74 cm (29 in) for females and 54 cm (21 in) for males. Their maximum diameter is about 95 cm (37 in). Like other members of the genus, they are ovoviviparous, the young developing in the uterus and receiving nourishment from a yolk or uterine secretions.

== Status ==
Living in shallow water above the continental shelf and being a schooling fish, the longnose eagle ray is vulnerable to fishing activities; it is not a target species, but is sometimes landed as bycatch by trawling, gillnets, and longline fisheries, with the areas where it lives being subject to intensive fishing pressure. Off the coast of Mexico, it is often caught while trawling for shrimp; most of the fish caught in this way are discarded, but some are sold locally as fresh meat, or the flesh is dried or salted. Because of this vulnerability to fishing, and because these eagle rays have a low fecundity, the International Union for Conservation of Nature has assessed their conservation status as being "vulnerable".
