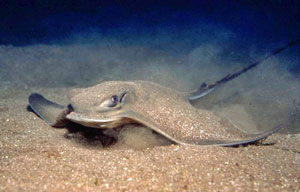

Conservation status
- Critically Endangered (IUCN 3.1)

Scientific classification
- Kingdom: Animalia
- Phylum: Chordata
- Class: Chondrichthyes
- Subclass: Elasmobranchii
- Order: Myliobatiformes
- Family: Myliobatidae
- Genus: Myliobatis
- Species: M. aquila

Binomial name
- Myliobatis aquila (Linnaeus, 1758)

Synonyms
- Leiobatus aquila (Linnaeus, 1758); Myliobatis cervus Smith, 1935; Myliobatis equila (Linnaeus, 1758); Myliobatis noctula Bonaparte, 1833; Myliobatus aquila (Linnaeus, 1758); Raia rhombus Larrañaga, 1923; Raja aquila Linnaeus, 1758

= Common eagle ray =

Common eagle ray Temporal range: 2.588–Present Ma

Species of fish

The common eagle ray or bullray (Myliobatis aquila) is a species of fish in the family Myliobatidae. It inhabits the eastern Atlantic Ocean (North Sea to South Africa), the Mediterranean Sea and the south-western Indian Ocean.

== Description ==
The common eagle ray reaches up to 183 cm (6.0 ft) in total length with a disc width up to 80 cm (2.6 ft), though most specimens are smaller. Females grow to be larger than males. The dorsal surface is brown or black while the ventral surface is white. It has a rhomboidal disc with a pair of large, triangular pectoral fins projecting on either side, and a single dorsal fin. The blunt snout is rounded and the tail is long and slender, with a large spine at its base but no tail fin. On average, males have 72 spine serrations and females have 66 spine serrations. The spine makes about 70% of the male's length and 65% of the female's length. The mid dorsal groove, which contains the glandular tissue necessary for venom injection, extends along 10–40% the tail. It has one or two excretory channels for the venom.

== Distribution and habitat ==
This species occurs in the eastern Atlantic Ocean, including the North Sea, from the British Isles to South Africa, extending to the Indian Ocean. It is also found in the Mediterranean Sea. It occurs both close to the shore and further out, at depths down to about 800 m (2,600 ft), but much of its time is spent in shallower water at less than 50 m (160 ft). It typically prefers more open sandy areas. It has also been found in a semi-enclosed lagoon on Gran Canaria Island, particularly in winter (March to April) and summer (August to October), where it was founded to prefer rocky and mixed bottoms.

== Ecology ==
=== Feeding and diet ===
Benthic invertebrates form an important part of the common eagle ray's diet. The species largely feeds on crustaceans and bivalve molluscs that it excavates from the seabed. Other items in its diet include polychaete worms, gastropod molluscs, sea pens and small fish. Larger individuals consume more fish than smaller individuals. Instead of having pointed teeth, it has flattened hexagonal bars and plates arranged in a mosaic pattern on its jaws; with these, it crushes the shells of its prey.

Mollusks and teleost fish were found to be the most important food items for individuals living in the Sea of Marmara, although polychaetas and crustaceans were also frequently found amongst the stomach contents. Calliostoma lusitanicum and Stramonita haemastoma are the most common prey species off the coast off the Azores.

=== Reproduction and development ===
This species is known to gather in groups of dozens of individuals during the reproductive period. Reproduction is oviviviparous. A clutch of three to seven young develop inside the mother, receiving nourishment at first from their egg yolks, but later from fluids secreted by their mother into her uterus. The gestation period is 6–8 months long, after which the female gives birth to between three and seven live pups. The smallest juveniles were caught around France between May and September off the coast of France. They still had a unhealed scar on the lower surface, suggesting they were neonates. A study conducted in South Africa in 1983 found juveniles in November. Juveniles were also found at Gran Canaria Island in October.

==== Female development ====
Juvenile females have whitish membranous ovaries and thread-like oviducts. The oviducal glands are inconspicuous. Sub-adults have white translucent follicles and a well differentiated genital duct. The oviducal glands are slightly rounded. Adult females captured in January and March off the coast of France were found to have developing oocytes in both ovaries. The uteri were thick and muscular. They contained uterine fluid, which is probably sectreted from the villi that cover the internal wall. Females caught in August and September in the same region had between eight and ten yolky oocytes of a similar size and mass. Both uteri were enlarged and contained uterine fluid. The villi were well-developed and formed the trophonemata, which plays an important role in stingray gestation. Fertilised eggs surrounded by a diaphanous and a yellowish capsule that tapered to a small filament at either end were found in a female captured in October. The ovary contained atretic oocytes.

==== Male development ====
Juvenile males have thread-like testes and genital ducts. The orbits have a smooth surface. Sub-adult males have no externally visible spermatocysts on the testes or sperm in the seminal vesicles. The superior surface of the orbit has a conspicuous protrusion. Adult males have elongated calcified claspers that are larger than the pelvic fins. The testes are well developed with visible external spermatocysts, a twisted genital duct and sperm in the seminal vesicles. They have well-developed conical supra-orbital vesicles.

==== Hermaphrotism ====
At least one hermaphroditic specimen has been recorded. This specimen was classified as an abnormal hermaphrodite, meaning it was unable to perform as a functioning male or female as the reproductive organs were underdeveloped.

=== Parasites ===
Several parasites live in and on this species. These include Entobdella diadema on the skin and Monocotyle myliobatis in the gills.

== Relationship with humans ==
While it does contain venom, this species is not considered to pose a risk to humans as stings typically don't have any strong effects.

=== Fishing ===
This species is sometimes caught as bycatch, including in the pelagic trawl fishery. Due to declining numbers, the levels of bycatch are not nearly as high as they were historically. A study in the Adriatic Sea showed that, on average, the fisheries in the region catch one common eagle ray every 20 hauls. About 79% of these are released alive after capture. The frequency is impacted by the depth of trawling, the season and the area being trawled. Most individuals were caught between April and September in the more northern areas at depths of 20–40 m (66–131 ft).

=== Tourism ===
This species has gained economic importance through underwater photographers and other SCUBA divers.

=== Bioaccumulation ===
A study in the Mediterranean Sea examined the mercury and methylmercury (the most common organic mercury compound) concentrations in three cartilaginous fish species. The common eagle ray was found to have lower mercury concentrations (0.67-1.01 mg/kg) than Chimaera monstrosa or Torpedo nobiliana. This is likely due to its diet as both the other two species feed on higher trophic levels (compared to the invertebrates that make up this eagle ray's diet). It also had the lowest methylmercury concentration (an average of 72%). This species does, however, appear to have higher levels of arsenic in its tissues than pelagic ray species.

== Status ==
The International Union for Conservation of Nature to rate it as "critically endangered".

The taxonomic position of this fish is unclear as populations in the Mediterranean Sea may be a different species from those in the southeastern Atlantic. In the Gulf of Lion in the northwestern Mediterranean Sea, populations declined in the 1970s, and there and elsewhere in the Mediterranean, the fish is under threat from intensive fishing. The population has also been declining in the Atlantic Ocean off the coast of Europe, where it was once one of the most common skate and ray bycatch species (which collectively made up a total of about a quarter of the total catch by mass in 1881). The species is now rare in the region.

Along the coast of West Africa it is also the subject of artisanal fishing activities but these are less intensive and populations may be steady.
