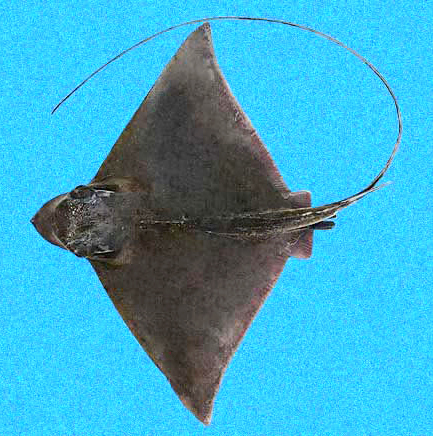

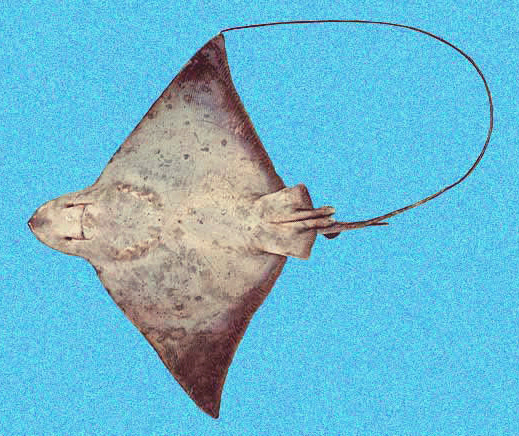

Conservation status
- Vulnerable (IUCN 3.1)

Scientific classification
- Kingdom: Animalia
- Phylum: Chordata
- Class: Chondrichthyes
- Subclass: Elasmobranchii
- Order: Myliobatiformes
- Family: Myliobatidae
- Genus: Myliobatis
- Species: M. freminvillei

Binomial name
- Myliobatis freminvillei Lesueur, 1824
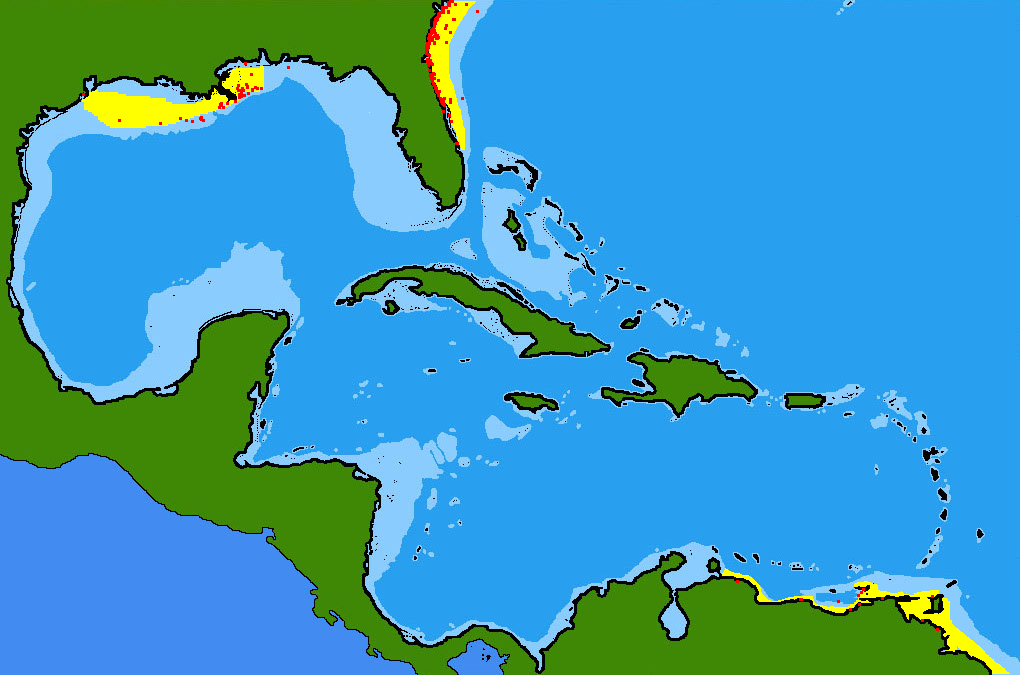

Synonyms
- Myliobatis freminvillii orth. error

= Bullnose eagle ray =

Species of cartilaginous fish

The bullnose eagle ray or bullnose ray (Myliobatis freminvillei) is species of eagle ray, which is widely distributed in the western Atlantic. It is most frequently found at a depth of 1–10 metres (3–33 ft), but can be found at the surface and up to a depth of 122 metres (400 ft). The species resides in the coastal waters and estuaries of the Eastern portions of North and South America. There are two distinct ranges for the species as it absent from Central America and the Caribbean. It is often confused with the southern eagle ray (M. goodei), due to a similarity in appearance and overlap in range. The Northern range spans from Massachusetts to Texas; the southern range spans from Venezuela to Buenos Aires, Argentina. It reaches a maximum disc width 106 cm (42 in) in disc width and gives birth to six young per litter. The bullnose ray feeds primarily on crustaceans, gastropods, and isopods.

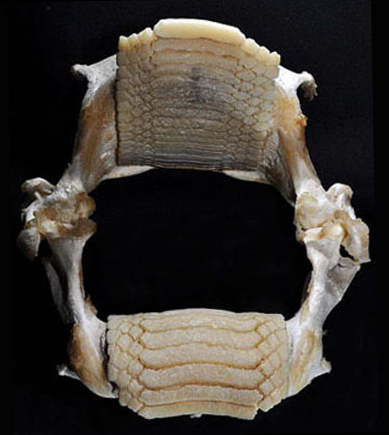
Jaws
