= Ronald Hamlyn-Harris =

English-born entomologist

Dr Ronald Hamlyn-Harris (1 September 1874 – 1953) was an English-born entomologist who spent most of his working life in Australia. Following seven years teaching science at Toowoomba Grammar School in Queensland he became Director of the Queensland Museum, later occupying several positions culminating in lecturing at the University of Queensland.

== Early life ==
Ronald Hamlyn-Harris was born in Eastbourne, England on 1 September 1874 to Hamlyn Huntingdon Harris, a retired lieutenant of the 18th Royal Hussars, and his wife, Sarah Wheeler. He was educated in England and Germany and trained as an estate manager, taking charge of his father's estates in Gloucestershire and becoming an expert on keeping bees. He studied further, first in Naples, Italy before receiving his doctorate from the University of Tübingen in Germany in 1902.

== Career ==
Hamlyn-Harris travelled to Australia the following year and took up a teaching post at Toowoomba Grammar School in Queensland. Here he revitalised the science department, organised the raising of money to build a new laboratory and gave public lectures. His enthusiasm for natural history inspired the boys, and he became president of the Field Naturalist's Club in Toowoomba. Under his auspices, the club thrived, increasing its membership greatly. He took an interest in anything that would advance the interests of Toowoomba, and was on the science committee of the Austral Association, which held an annual festival in the city.

He married Bertha Hamlyn, née Harris, in 1908; the couple had three sons and three daughters. After seven and a half years at Toowoomba, Hamlyn-Harris left in 1910 to take up the post of Director of the Queensland Museum in Brisbane where he served for seven years. Here he became friends with the Australian ichthyologist James Douglas Ogilby who was involved in fish research and was pleased to be able to pass the museum's administrative work to the new director. In 1911, Ogilby named the purple eagle ray (Myliobatis hamlyni), a fish he was describing for the first time, in honour of Hamlyn-Harris.

Hamlyn-Harris left the museum because of ill health, and after five years running a fruit farm, in 1922 he was put in charge of the government laboratory in Brisbane researching hookworms. In 1926 he became the city entomologist before becoming a lecturer at the University of Queensland in 1936. One of the students he supervised at UQ, would also pursue a career in entomology, Elizabeth Nesta Marks.

Hamlyn-Harris retired in 1942 and died in 1953.
