= Shortnose eagle ray =

Myliobatis ridens

Conservation status
- Critically Endangered (IUCN 3.1)

Scientific classification
- Domain: Eukaryota
- Kingdom: Animalia
- Phylum: Chordata
- Class: Chondrichthyes
- Subclass: Elasmobranchii
- Order: Myliobatiformes
- Family: Myliobatidae
- Genus: Myliobatis
- Species: M. ridens

Binomial name
- Myliobatis ridens Ruocco et al., 2012

Species of cartilaginous fish

The shortnose eagle ray (Myliobatis ridens) is a species of eagle ray that lives in the southwestern Atlantic Ocean off Brazil, Uruguay and Argentina.
