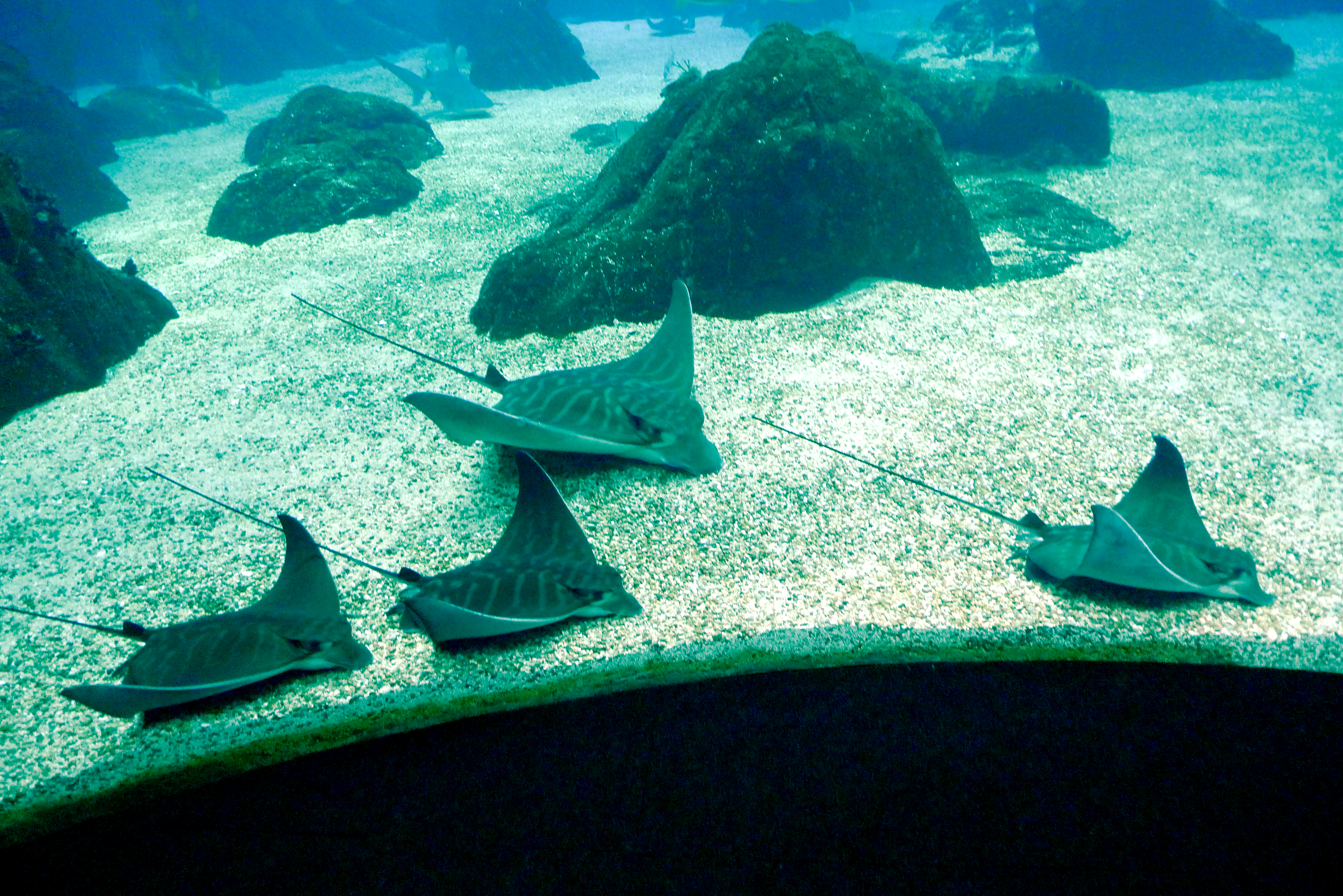
- Aetomylaeus bovinus

Scientific classification
- Kingdom: Animalia
- Phylum: Chordata
- Class: Chondrichthyes
- Subclass: Elasmobranchii
- Order: Myliobatiformes
- Family: Myliobatidae
- Genus: Aetomylaeus; Garman, 1908

Synonyms
- Pteromylaeus Garman, 1913

= Aetomylaeus =

Aetomylaeus Temporal range: 45–0 Ma Middle Eocene to Present

Genus of cartilaginous fishes

Aetomylaeus is a genus of eagle rays in the family Myliobatidae.

== Species ==
There are currently eight recognized species in this genus:

Image	Scientific name	Common name	Distribution
	Aetomylaeus asperrimus (C. H. Gilbert, 1898)	Rough eagle ray or Roughskin Bullray	Panama and the Galapagos Islands
	Aetomylaeus bovinus (É. Geoffroy Saint-Hilaire, 1817)	Bull ray	coasts of Europe and Africa.
	Aetomylaeus caeruleofasciatus W. T. White, Last & Baje, 2015	Blue-banded eagle ray	northern Australia and southern Papua New Guinea
	Aetomylaeus maculatus (J. E. Gray, 1834)	Mottled eagle ray	India to China and Indonesia.
	Aetomylaeus milvus (J. P. Müller & Henle, 1841)	Ocellate Eagle Ray	Red Sea to China, south to Indonesia.
	Aetomylaeus nichofii (Bloch & J. G. Schneider, 1801)	Banded eagle ray	Australia, Bangladesh, Brunei, Cambodia, China, India, Indonesia, Japan, North Korea, South Korea, Malaysia, Myanmar, Pakistan, Papua New Guinea, the Philippines, Singapore, Sri Lanka, Taiwan, Thailand, Vietnam, possibly Maldives
	Aetomylaeus vespertilio (Bleeker, 1852)	Ornate eagle ray	coasts of Australia, China, India, Indonesia, Malaysia, Maldives, Mozambique, Palau, Philippines, Seychelles, South Africa, Taiwan, and Thailand
	Aetomylaeus wafickii (Jabado, Ebert & Al Dhaheri, 2022)	Wafic’s eagle ray	Oman, United Arab Emirates

The recognized extinct species:

- †Aetomylaeus cojimarensis Iturralde-Vinent, Mora, Rojas & Gutierriez, 1998 (Miocene of Cuba)
- †Aetomylaeus cubensis Iturralde-Vinent, Mora, Rojas & Gutierriez, 1998 (Miocene of Cuba)
- †Aetomylaeus dixoni (Agassiz, 1843) (?early to late Eocene of England, France & Germany)
- †Aetomylaeus meridionalis (Gervais, 1852) (Pliocene of France & Mallorca, Spain)
