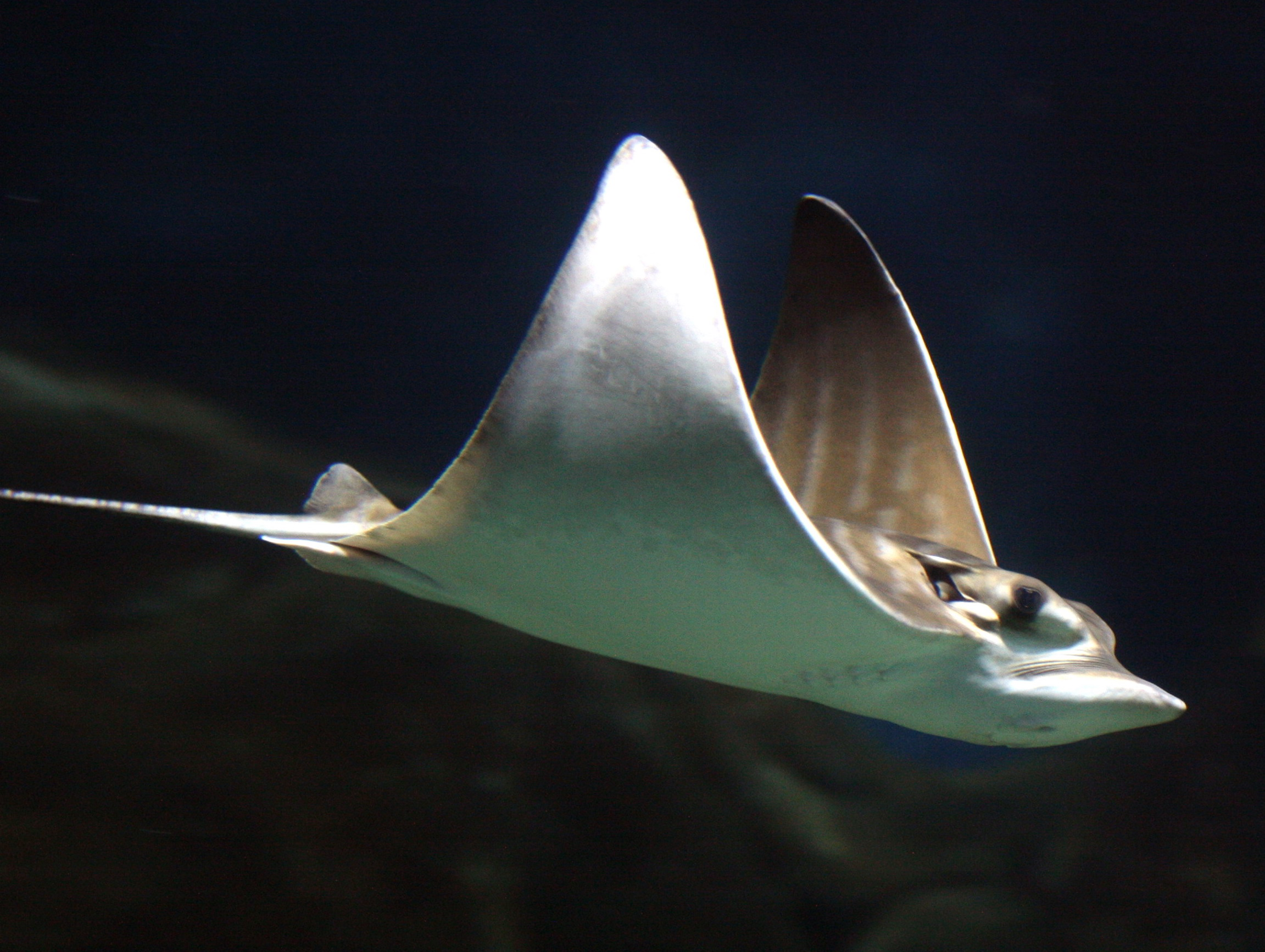

Conservation status
- Critically Endangered (IUCN 3.1)

Scientific classification
- Kingdom: Animalia
- Phylum: Chordata
- Class: Chondrichthyes
- Subclass: Elasmobranchii
- Order: Myliobatiformes
- Family: Myliobatidae
- Genus: Aetomylaeus
- Species: A. bovinus

Binomial name
- Aetomylaeus bovinus (É. Geoffroy Saint-Hilaire, 1817)

Synonyms
- Pteromylaeus bovinus Geoffroy Saint-Hilaire, 1817

= Bull ray =

Species of cartilaginous fish

Aetomylaeus bovinus, also known as the bull ray, duckbill ray, or duckbill eagle ray, is a species of large stingray of the family Myliobatidae found around the coasts of Europe and Africa.

== Biology and ecology ==
The species is ovoviviparous and reach sexual maturity at four to six years old. With a low fecundity of three to four pups per litter and a long gestation of six to 12 months (depending on the geographical zone), this species has a very sensitive life history.

Very little is known concerning the ecology and behavior of A. bovinus. However, it is part of the coastal marine megafauna, and with a maximum discal width (tip to tip) of 2.22 m (7 ft 3 in), 1.5 m (4 ft 11 in) in length and weighing up to 116 kg (256 lb), bull rays can be considered as giants of the shallow waters. Like in many elasmobranch species, females are larger and heavier than males. The species does exhibit some schooling behaviours, that are currently not understood.

Their large maximum size and general preference for shallow depth ranges of 0–30 m (0–98 ft) exposes them to various threats. Bull rays appear to be extremely rare throughout the Mediterranean region, and its current population trend is decreasing, with an estimated population decline of >80% in the last 3 generations.

This fish is named the bull ray because of the shape of its head and it is sometimes called the duckbill ray in South Africa for its long, flat, round snout.

Bull rays are "bentho-pelagic" feeders, which means that they feed on the sea floor and the water column. They feed on various invertebrates, including crabs, hermit crabs, squids, prawns, gastropod molluscs and bivalve molluscs. They often cause damage to clam and oyster farms.

The dorsal patterns of bull rays are consistent as they age, allowing for photo identification methodologies to identify specific individuals. Similar methodologies are well documented and utilised for other elasmobranch species with unique patterns such as the Whale shark and Manta ray.

== Threats ==
Aetomylaeus bovinus is facing various and numerous threats, from fisheries to habitat degradation. As it is a benthic and semi-pelagic feeder, it is by-catch by a large game of industrial or artisanal fishing gear, especially pelagic trawling, bottom trawling, trammel nets, gill nets and spearfishing.

Little information is available concerning this species in Africa. However, old literature refers to a discard of 900 t (890 long tons; 990 short tons) per year of bull rays by-caught by shrimp trawlers on the West African coast in 1988 during their late juvenile and sub/adult phase.

== Conservation and status ==
On a global scale, Aetomylaeus bovinus is classified as Critically Endangered. The bull ray is now part of the 53% of elasmobranchs native to the Mediterranean Sea that are at risk of extinction and require urgent action to conserve their population and habitats. Bull rays appear to be extremely rare throughout the Mediterranean region and their current population trend is highly suspected to be decreasing (by 80% during the last 45 years according to IUCN). There are currently no species-specific measures in place. Much research is required on the bull ray's population, size, trend, habitat, ecology, and threats. In order to protect the bull ray, its habitat needs to be protected, its harvest monitored and managed, and implementation of education and awareness programs could be beneficial.

== Distribution and habitat ==
The full distribution of the bull ray is uncertain but it is known to be found in the Mediterranean Sea, the Black Sea, the eastern Atlantic Ocean between Portugal and Guinea, the Atlantic from north of Saldanha Bay in western South Africa and round the rest of the South African coast into the Indian Ocean up to Maputo Bay in southern Mozambique, also Zanzibar and Kenya.

It is found between the surf zone and depths of 65 m (213 ft) or more and also enters estuaries and lagoons. Some of these shallow coastal habitats may function as nursery areas, such as in Malta.

The species frequents both the bottom and the surface and sometimes leaps from the water.

Various aspects of the ecology and distribution of the species remain unknown, such as population size, trends, and movement dynamics. However, like many members of the family Myliobatidae, Aetomylaeus bovinus is a migratory species, with some tagged specimens off South Africa demonstrating migrations in excess of 900 km, and seasonal Philopatry.
