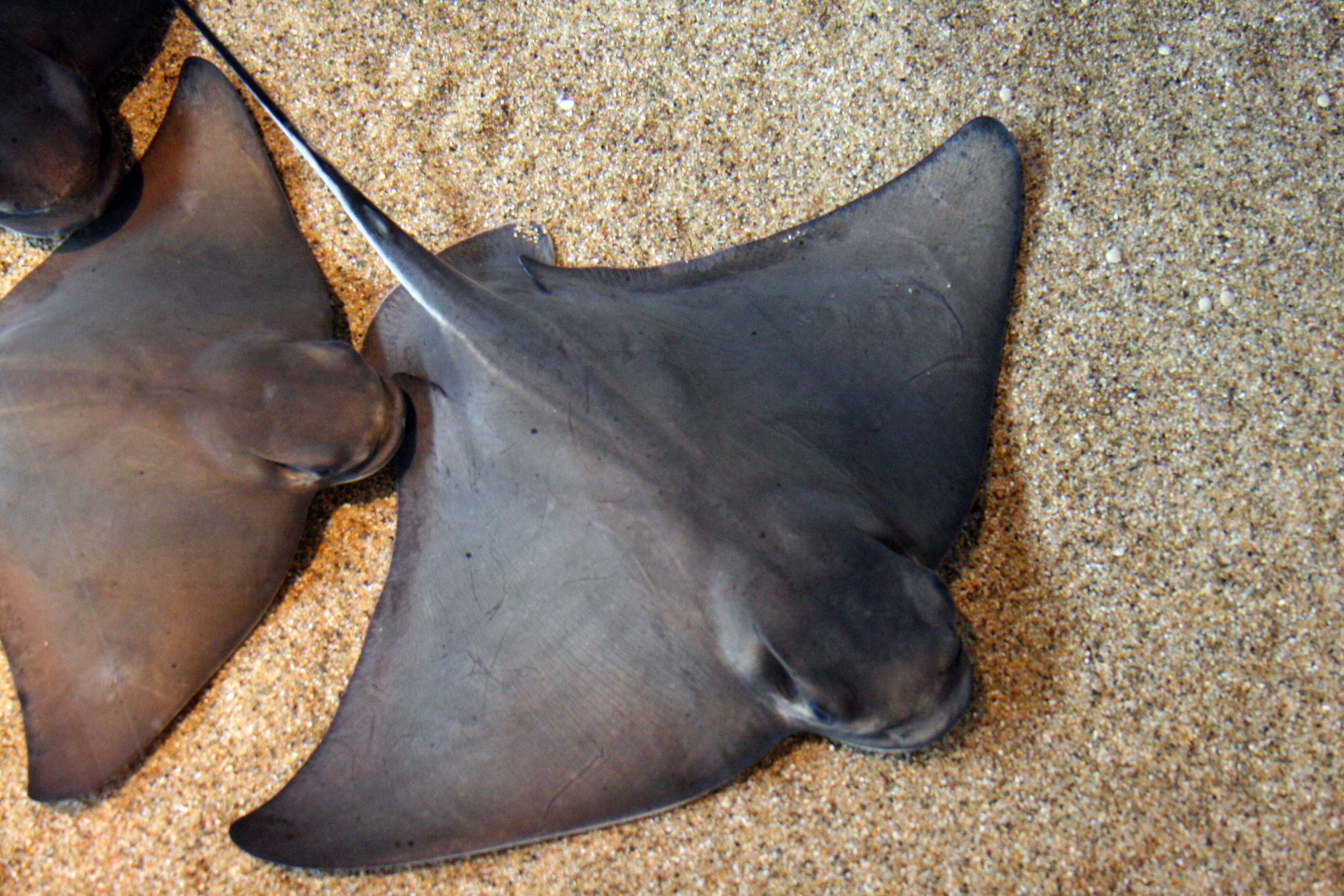
- Myliobatis californica

Scientific classification
- Kingdom: Animalia
- Phylum: Chordata
- Class: Chondrichthyes
- Subclass: Elasmobranchii
- Order: Myliobatiformes
- Family: Myliobatidae
- Genus: Myliobatis; Cuvier, 1816

Type species
- Raja aquila (Linnaeus, 1758)

Species
- See text

= Myliobatis =

Myliobatis Temporal range: 65–0 Ma Danian to present

Genus of cartilaginous fishes

Myliobatis is a genus of eagle rays in the family Myliobatidae.

== Description ==
Myliobatis species can reach a width up to about 1.8 m (6 ft). Their bodies consist of a rhomboidal disc, wider than long, with one dorsal fin. The head is broad and short, with eyes and spiracles on the sides. The tail is slender, with one or two large spines at the base, without tail fin.

The teeth are arranged in the lower and upper jaws in flat tooth plates called pavement teeth, each consisting of about seven series of plates, which are used to crush clam shells and crustaceans.

== Biology ==
Myliobatis species are ovoviviparous. Their gestation lasts about six months, and a female produces four to seven embryos. Myliobatis species mainly feed on molluscs, bottom-living crustaceans, and small fishes.

== Habitat ==
Myliobatis species live in warm, shallow waters. Adults prefer sandy shores, while juveniles can usually be encountered offshore.

== Species ==
=== Extant species ===
Currently, 11 species in this genus are recognized:

Image	Scientific name	Common name	Distribution
	Myliobatis aquila (Linnaeus, 1758)	common eagle ray	Atlantic Ocean (North Sea to South Africa), the Mediterranean Sea and the south-western Indian Ocean.
	Myliobatis californica T. N. Gill, 1865	bat eagle ray	eastern Pacific Ocean, between the Oregon coast and the Gulf of California.
	Myliobatis chilensis Philippi {Krumweide}, 1893	Chilean eagle ray	coasts of Chile and Peru
	Myliobatis freminvillei Lesueur, 1824	bullnose eagle ray	from Cape Cod down to Argentina
	Myliobatis goodei Garman, 1885	southern eagle ray	Atlantic coast, from the tip of Florida down to Argentina
	Myliobatis hamlyni J. D. Ogilby, 1911	purple eagle ray	Australia, Indonesia, the Philippines, Taiwan and Okinawa
	Myliobatis longirostris Applegate & Fitch, 1964	snouted eagle ray	Pacific Ocean from Baja California and the Gulf of California to Sechura, Peru
	Myliobatis peruvianus Garman, 1913	Peruvian eagle ray	Pacific Ocean off Chile and Peru.
	Myliobatis ridens Ruocco, Lucifora, Díaz de Astarloa, Mabragaña & Delpiani, 2012	shortnose eagle ray	southwestern Atlantic Ocean off Brazil and Argentina.
	Myliobatis tenuicaudatus Hector, 1877	Australian/New Zealand eagle ray	near rocky reefs around New Zealand and southern Australia
	Myliobatis tobijei Bleeker, 1854	Japanese eagle ray	Indonesia and the Philippines, Japan, Korea, and China.

=== Extinct species ===
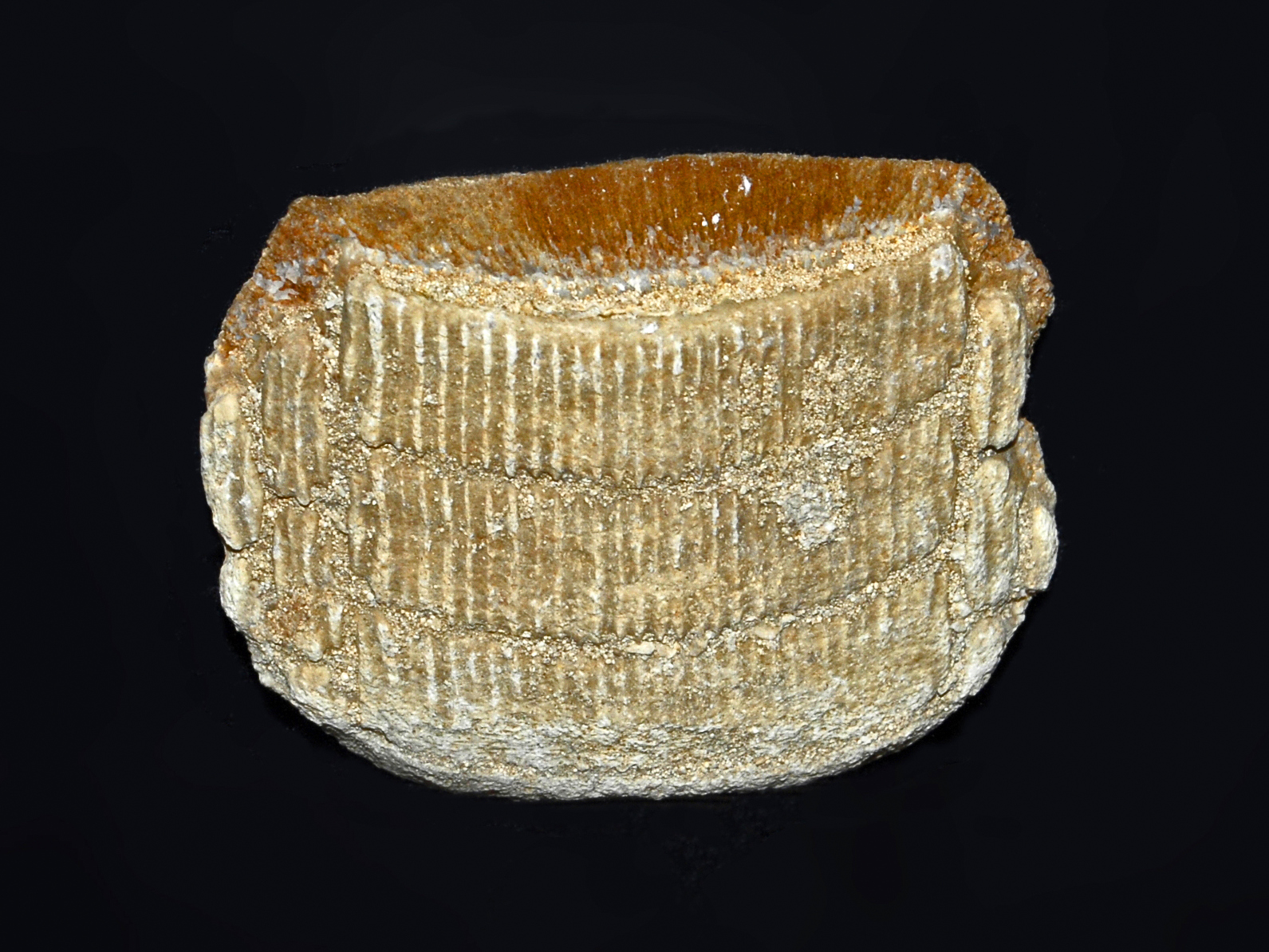
Fossil tooth or plate of M. dixoni from Khouribga (Morocco), 55-45 Mya

Extinct species within this genus include:

- †Myliobatis acutus Agassiz, 1843
- †Myliobatis affinis Chapman & Cudmore, 1924
- †Myliobatis albestii Pauca, 1929
- †Myliobatis altavillae Meschinelli, 1924
- †Myliobatis altus Davis, 1888
- †Myliobatis americanus Bravard, 1884
- †Myliobatis angustidens Sismonda, 1849
- †Myliobatis angustus Agassiz, 1843
- †Myliobatis arcuatus Davis, 1888
- †Myliobatis bellardii Issel, 1877
- †Myliobatis bilobatus Dartevelle & Casier, 1943
- †Myliobatis bisulcus Marsh, 1870
- †Myliobatis bothriodon White, 1926
- †Myliobatis canaliculatus Agassiz, 1843
- †Myliobatis colei Agassiz, 1843
- †Myliobatis crassidens Dartevelle & Casier, 1959
- †Myliobatis dimorphus Delfortrie, 1871
- †Myliobatis dispar Leriche, 1913
- †Myliobatis dixoni Agassiz, 1843
- †Myliobatis elatus Stromer, 1905
- †Myliobatis enormis Mendiola, 1999
- †Myliobatis erctensis Salinas, 1901
- †Myliobatis fastigiatus Leidy, 1876
- †Myliobatis fraasi Stromer, 1905
- †Myliobatis frangens Eastman, 1904
- †Myliobatis funiculatus Delfortrie, 1871
- †Myliobatis gigas Cope, 1867
- †Myliobatis girondicus Pedroni, 1844
- †Myliobatis goniopleurus Agassiz, 1843
- †Myliobatis granulosus Issel, 1877
- †Myliobatis haueri Penecke, 1884
- †Myliobatis holmesii Gibbes, 1849
- †Myliobatis intermedius Dartevelle & Casier, 1943
- †Myliobatis kummeli Fowler, 1911
- †Myliobatis lagaillardei Thomas, 1904
- †Myliobatis lateralis Agassiz, 1843
- †Myliobatis leidyi Hay, 1899
- †Myliobatis leognanensis Delfortrie, 1871
- †Myliobatis lepersonnei Dartevelle & Casier, 1959
- †Myliobatis llopisi Bauzá & Gomez Pallerola, 1982
- †Myliobatis marginalis Agassiz, 1843
- †Myliobatis merriami Jordan & Beal, 1913
- †Myliobatis meyeri Weiler, 1922
- †Myliobatis micropleurus Agassiz, 1843
- †Myliobatis microrhizus Delfortrie, 1871
- †Myliobatis miocenicus Böhm, 1942
- †Myliobatis mokattamensis Stromer, 1905
- †Myliobatis monnieri Cappetta, 1986
- †Myliobatis moorabbinensis Chapman & Pritchard, 1907
- †Myliobatis mordax Leidy, 1876
- †Myliobatis moutai Dartevelle & Casier, 1959
- †Myliobatis nzadinensis Dartevelle & Casier, 1943
- †Myliobatis oweni Agassiz, 1843
- †Myliobatis pachyodon Cope, 1867
- †Myliobatis pachyrhizodus Fowler, 1911
- †Myliobatis pentoni Woodward, 1893
- †Myliobatis placentinus Carraroli, 1897
- †Myliobatis plicatilis Davis, 1888
- †Myliobatis prenticei Chapman & Cudmore, 1924
- †Myliobatis raouxi Arambourg, 1952
- †Myliobatis rima Meyer, 1844
- †Myliobatis rivierei Sauvage, 1878
- †Myliobatis rugosus Leidy, 1855
- †Myliobatis salentinus Botti, 1877
- †Myliobatis semperei Mendiola, 1999
- †Myliobatis sendaicus Hatai, Murata & Masuda, 1965
- †Myliobatis serratus Meyer, 1843
- †Myliobatis sinhaleyus Deraniyagala, 1937
- †Myliobatis stokesii Agassiz, 1843
- †Myliobatis striatus Buckland, 1837
- †Myliobatis strobeli Issel, 1877
- †Myliobatis testae Philippi, 1846
- †Myliobatis tewarii Mishra, 1980
- †Myliobatis toliapicus Agassiz, 1843
- †Myliobatis transversalis Gibbes, 1849
- †Myliobatis tumidens Woodward, 1889
- †Myliobatis undulatus Chaffee, 1939
- †Myliobatis vicomicanus Cope, 1867
- †Myliobatis wurnoensis White, 1934

These eagle rays lived from the Cretaceous to the Quaternary periods (from 70.6 to 0.012 Ma). Fossils of these fishes have been found worldwide.

The extinct species Myliobatis dixoni is known from Tertiary deposits along the Atlantic seaboards of the United States, Brazil, Nigeria, England, and Germany.

== Gallery ==
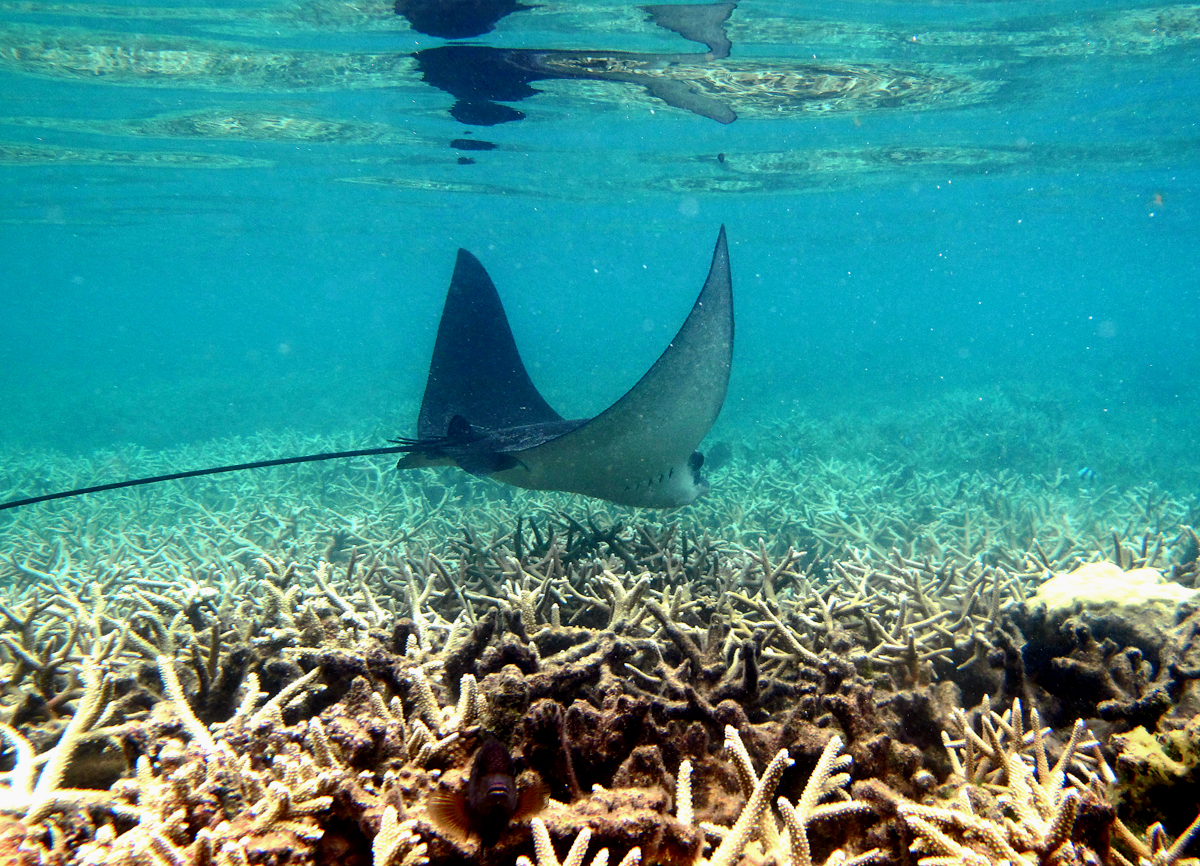
M. aquila

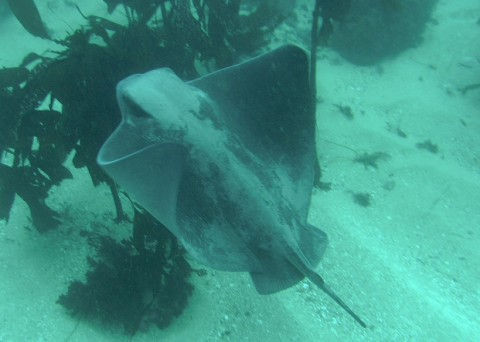
M. californica

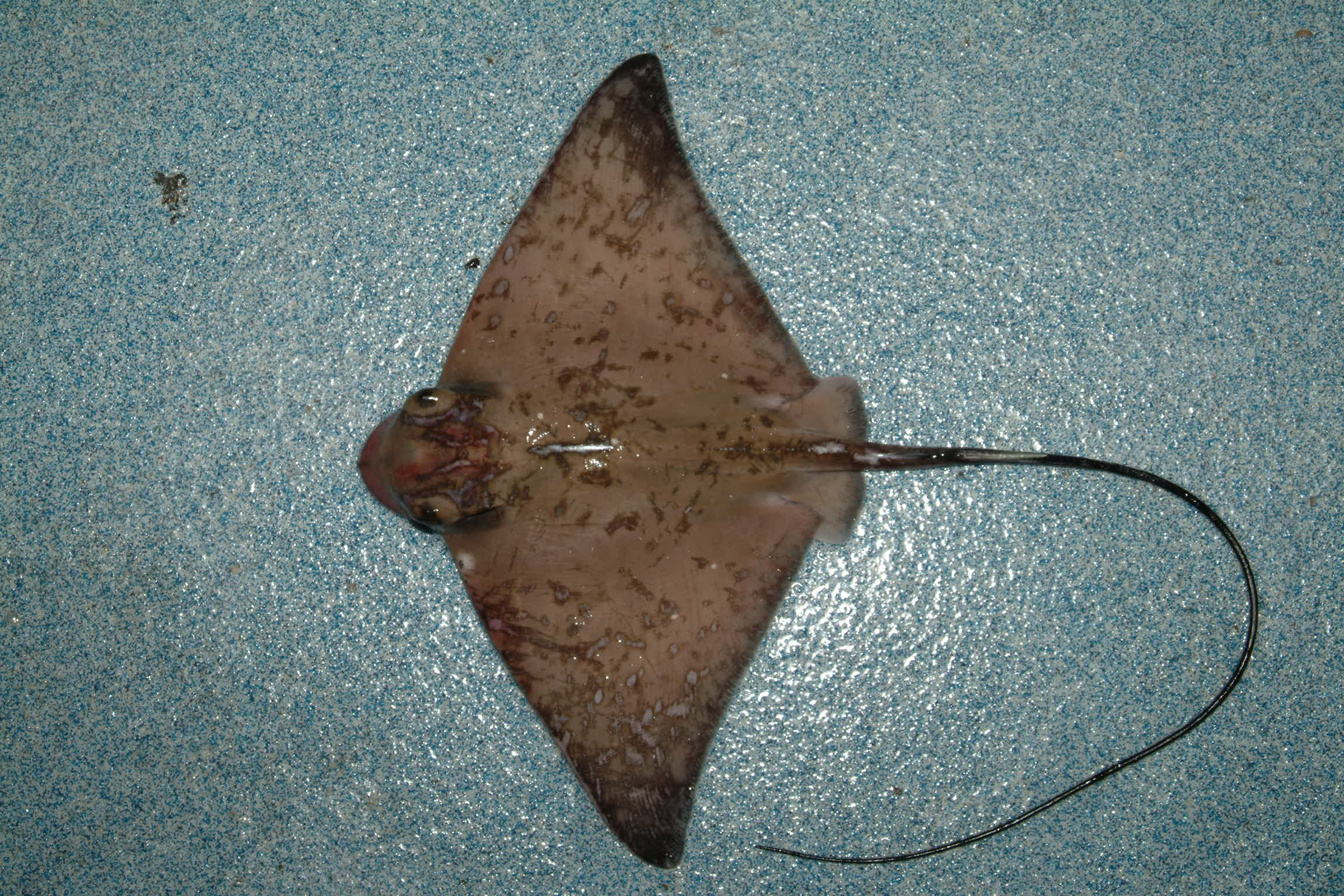
M. freminvillei

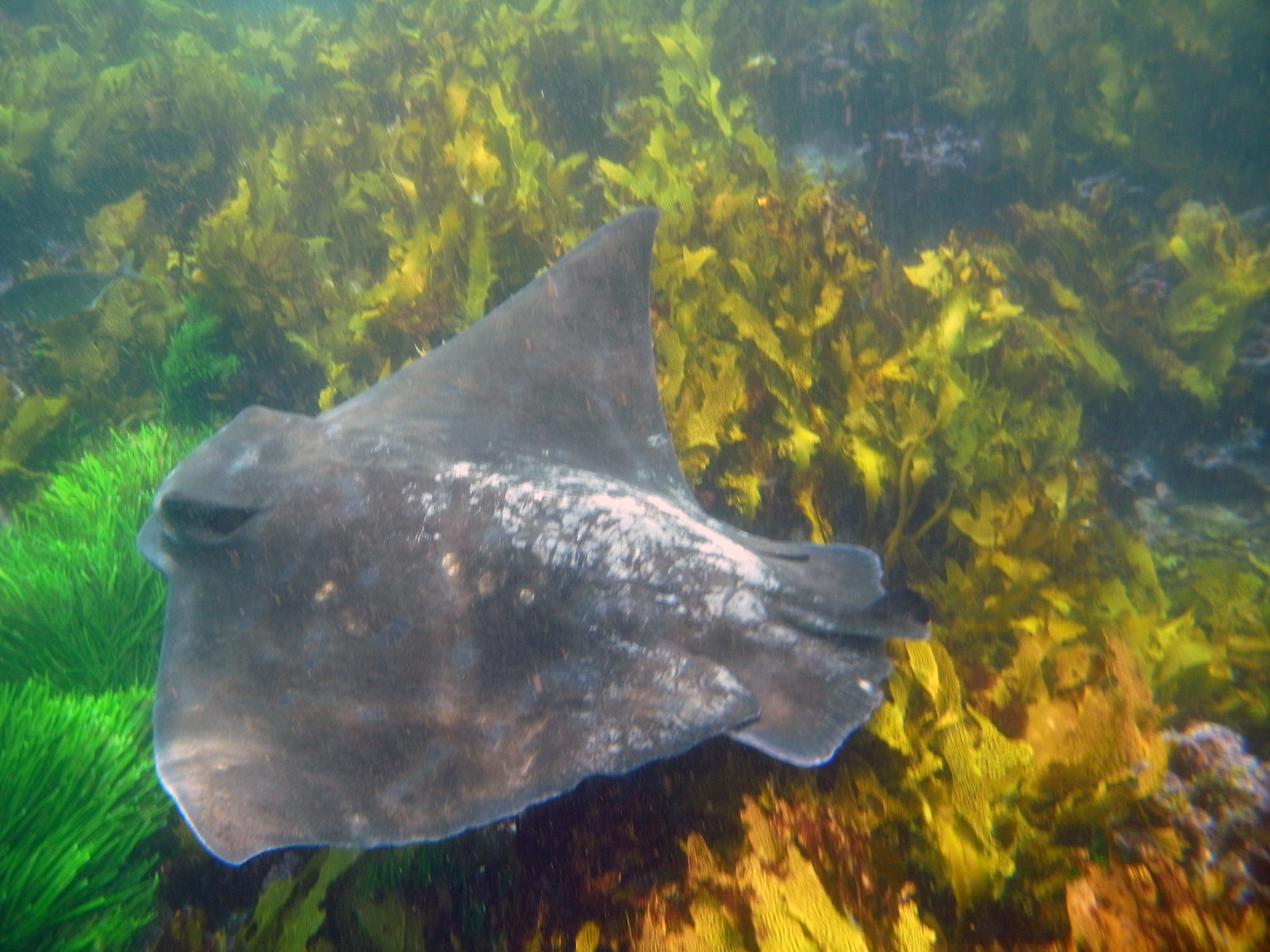
M. tenuicaudatus

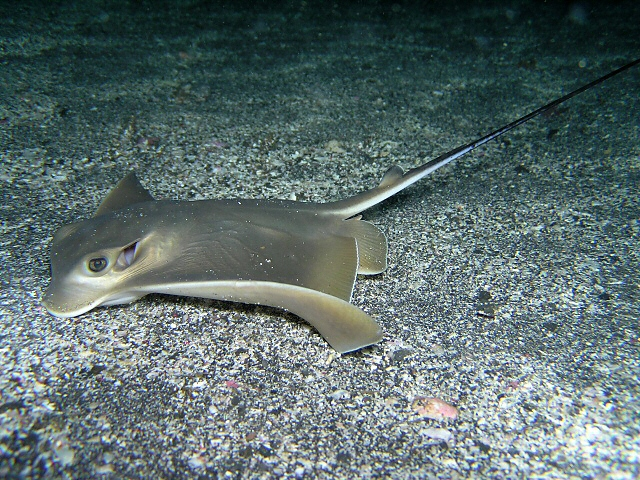
M. tobijei

== See also ==
- List of prehistoric cartilaginous fish
