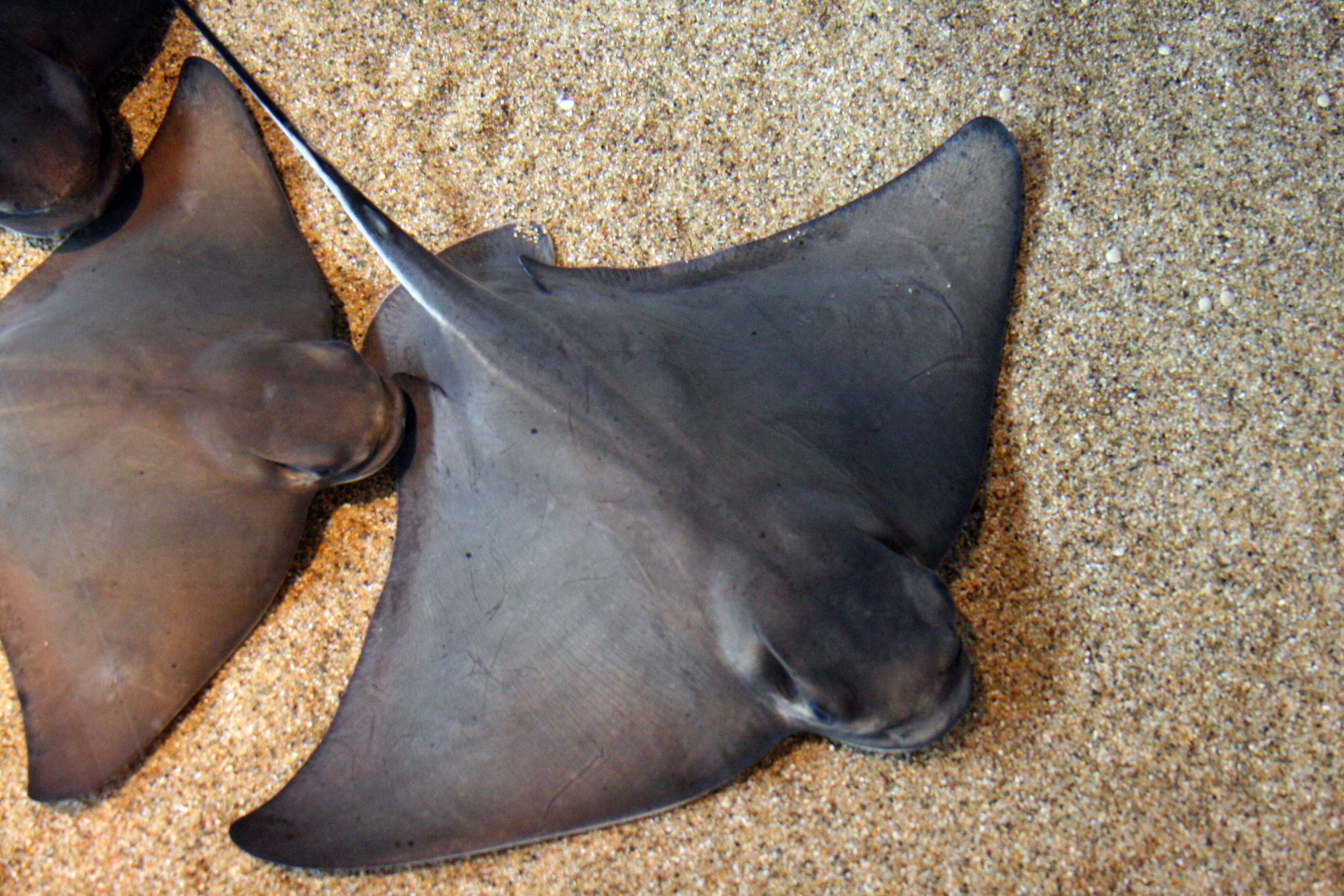

Conservation status
- Least Concern (IUCN 3.1)

Scientific classification
- Kingdom: Animalia
- Phylum: Chordata
- Class: Chondrichthyes
- Subclass: Elasmobranchii
- Order: Myliobatiformes
- Family: Myliobatidae
- Genus: Myliobatis
- Species: M. californica

Binomial name
- Myliobatis californica (T. N. Gill, 1865)
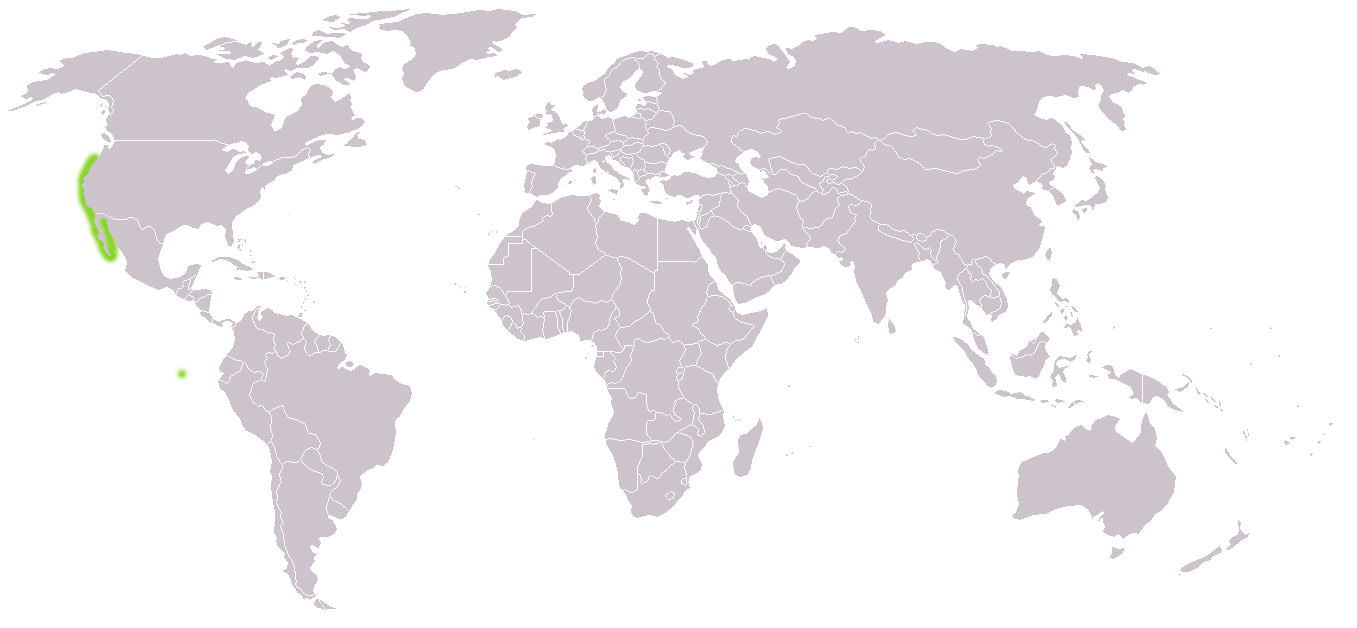
- Range map

= Bat ray =

Species of cartilaginous fish

The bat ray (Myliobatis californica) is an eagle ray that has a diamond ray-like form that consists of pectoral fins that are wing-like and end in blunt points. The head is broad and raised higher than the pectoral fins. The eyes are laterally situated on the broad head. Below the front of the head projection is a horizontal depression. This means that instead of the head being flat, there is a slight indent in the top of the head in between the eyes. The tail is whip-like and is typically incomplete with at least one venomous spine at the base of the tail. The incomplete aspect means that the tail consists of cartilage instead of bone. The dorsal side is black or a dark brown while the ventral side is white with the exception of the areas close to the tips or disk.

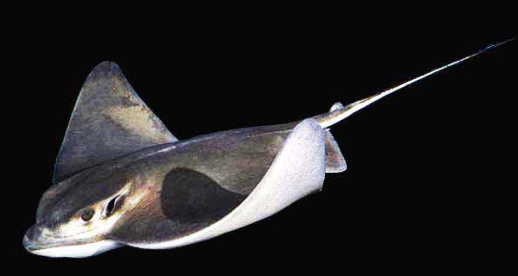
The photo shows a Bat Ray (Myliobatis californica) swimming.

The largest specimens can grow to a wingspan of 1.8 m (5 ft 11 in) and a mass of 91 kg (201 lb). There is a record of this species reaching 240 pounds, however large specimens are typically closer to 200 pounds. They typically range from 9.07–13.61 kg (20.0–30.0 lb). The size of the bat ray is dependent on many factors, such as habitat alterations and different oceanographic and environmental conditions. Some bat rays are solitary, while others form schools numbering in the thousands.

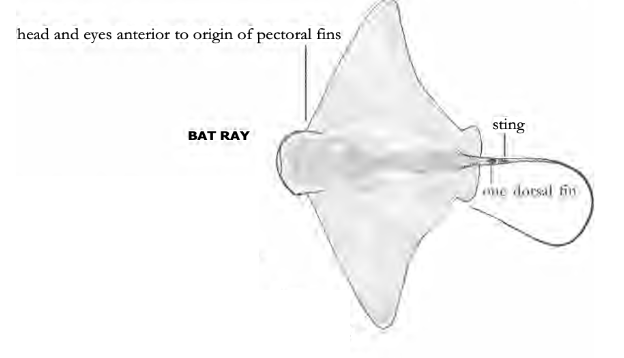
The photo shows the key anatomical features of the Bat Ray.

There has only been one record of albinism in this species during 1865 off the west coast of Baja California, Mexico.

There has been a record of an abnormal cephalic horn formation in a juvenile male on the coast of Baja California Sur, Mexico. This specimen had a total of three cephalic horns with one in the rostral middle area and two in the cephalic lobe zone. This could indicate morphogenetic plasticity in this species and could be an indication of how evolution of other species occurred. Morphogenetic plasticity is essentially the concept that organisms are able to change their physical structures due to genetic mutations or environmental factors and this can give us more information about the factors that may have caused these changes. Cephalic horns are a flexible projection from the front of the head and can be described as a modified aspect of their pectoral fins. These cephalic horns are used for pushing food into its mouth while feeding. Bat rays typically only have two cephalic horns and they are more reduced as compared to other ray species.

== Distribution ==
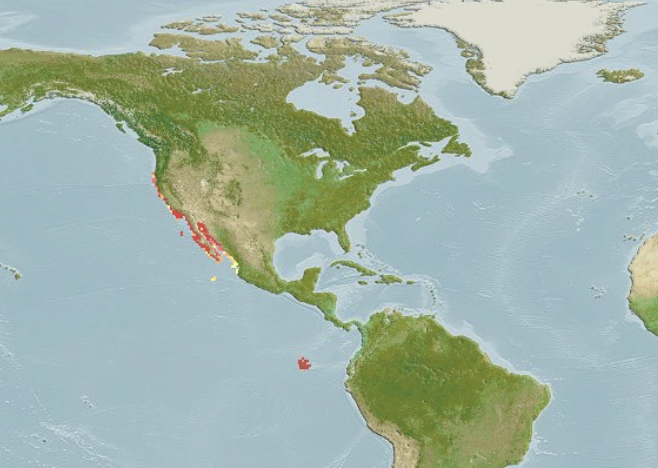
The image above is a range map of the Bat Ray with the relative probabilities of occurrence shown via a color scale.

The Bat Ray can be found in both tropical and temperate oceans from central Oregon in the USA to Mexico in the Gulf of California. The bat ray (Myliobatis californica) is found in muddy or sandy sloughs, estuaries and bays, kelp beds and rocky-bottomed shoreline. It is also found in the area around the Galápagos Islands. This species can typically be found in flat sections of water with a sand patch in between rocks or with a rocky bottom. They are commonly found in bays and sloughs within the shore area. They can be commonly found around offshore islands including San Clemente, Anacapa, and Santa Rosa. They have been observed during the summer and spring at San Clemente. During March and April they are common in the shallow waters of Santa Rosa. During the summer, they are common in the shallow water around Anacapa Island. Bat rays can live anywhere from the surface to up to 150 feet below the surface and are primarily concentrated within 8 to 100 feet below the surface.

== Biology ==
=== Reproduction ===
Bat ray reproduction is ovoviviparous. This means that the eggs are retained by the female and hatch inside of the female in a process that resembles a live birth. They mate annually, in the spring or summer, and have a gestation period of nine to twelve months. After this gestation period finishes, the pups are born. Litter sizes range from two to ten — pups emerge tail first with their pectoral fins wrapped around the body, and the venomous spine is flexible and covered in a sheath which sloughs off within hours of birth. Bat rays live up to 23 years.

Bat rays copulate while swimming with synchronized wingbeats—the male under the female. The male inserts a clasper into the female's cloaca, channeling semen into the orifice to fertilize her eggs.

The sexual maturity size of the female Bat Ray (Myliobatis california) is often greater than the male one. They have histotrophic viviparity with the embryo number in pregnant females ranging from two to five pups. Histotrophic viviparity is when the embryos inside the oviduct get their nutrition from uterine secretions instead of a yolk sac in order to grow throughout gestation without the need of a placenta.

For males, sexual maturity occurs at a disc width of 622 mm and a weight of about 3.7 kg around 2–3 years of age. Disc width is from tip to tip of each of the wings. These rays will have an abrupt transition in the clasper and disc width relationship once reaching sexual maturity. This causes 2–6 cartilaginous elements to grow at the distal end of the clasper near the end of the clasper.

For females, full sexual maturity is reached when at 63% of the asymptotic disc width at approximately 5–6 years of age. This ray has an essentially nonfunctional right ovary in addition to a right and left uteri that are able to function normally. Females can carry four size classes of ova. Larger bat rays will have an increased size and number of eggs. Bat rays have a low fecundity.

Size at birth can range from 220–305 mm. The bat ray breeds during the summer and follows an annual reproductive cycle. The approximate gestation period is 9–12 months.

Breeding behavior has been observed in August in Baja California. This behavior took place 20 feet below the surface on a rock reef with a sandy bottom. Two small males followed under a medium size female while pushing the genital region. This same behavior has also been seen in August at the Scripps Institute of Oceanography in a depth of 15 feet. In these areas, young are born in the late summer/early fall and subadults are most abundant during the summer close to the shore.

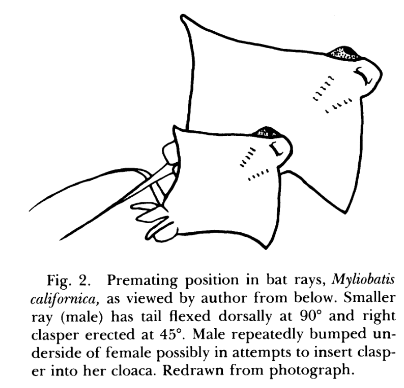
One particular breeding position consisted of the male being positioned slightly behind and below the female (who is larger than the male) while swimming in a synchronized manner at a slow pace.

One particular breeding position consisted of the male being positioned slightly behind and below the female (who is larger than the male) while swimming in a synchronized manner at a slow pace. The male's tail was dorsally positioned at a 90 degree angle while a clasper was dorsally extended at a 45 degree angle. The male moved repetitively back and forth in order to get closer to the underside of the female to insert the clasper into her cloaca.

=== Age/Growth ===
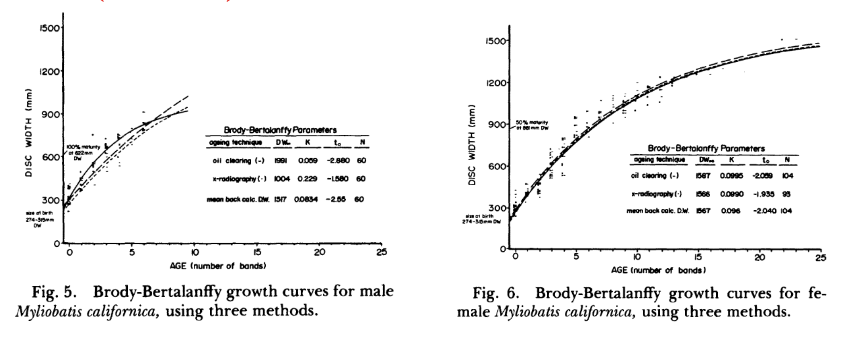
These graphs show the correlation between age and disc width for male and female Bat Rays.

Bat Rays cannot be aged using traditional aging methods due to their lack of structures that are calcified. Age can be determined by analyzing the growth bands on the vertebral centra. Narrow translucent bands are formed during the winter and opaque bands form in the summer months. Both oil-clearing and x-ray can be used; however, each is more precise in a different sex. Oil-clearing utilizes a dissection microscope and fiber optic light to examine a prepared centrum face in order to view the bands. To age males, x-radiography technique produces a more realistic growth curve. To age females, oil-clearing produces the best results. Female bat rays are able to have a larger asymptotic size at a disc width of 1587 mm when compared to males who only reach about 1004 mm. In addition, males have a greater growth rate at k=0.229 in comparison to females (k=0.0995).

== Diet ==
Bat rays feed on mollusks, crustaceans and small fish on the seabed, using their winglike pectoral fins to move sand and expose prey animals. They may also use their snout to dig trenches up to 20 cm deep to expose buried prey, such as clams. Bat rays create pits by excavating the substrate in order to feed upon invertebrates and small fish. These pits can be up to 20 cm deep and 4 m long. By digging up invertebrates, small fish are often attracted to take the chance to opportunistically prey upon these organisms. Bat rays are considered opportunistic generalists which means that they consume the food that is most available to them. These rays are most likely using a type of suction mechanism in order to obtain their smaller prey from the substrate. Bat rays commonly feed upon shellfish, but also feed on clams, polychaetes, crabs, shrimp, Echiuran worms, sea cucumbers, gastropods, ophiuroids, and teleost fishes. Larger rays tend to feed on a wider variety of prey items and also consume a greater amount of large prey items. In Humboldt Bay, clams are the primary food source for bat rays. Echiuran worms are only consumed by adult rays. Clams and crabs are more important food sources for female sub adult rays while polychaetes and shrimp are more important for sub adult males.

Bat ray teeth are flat and pavementlike, forming tightly-packed rows that are used for crushing and grinding prey—the crushed shells are ejected and the flesh consumed. As with all elasmobranchs, these teeth fall out and are replaced continuously. Prey with shells are broken with teeth and then these hard shell parts are spit out while the softer pieces are swallowed. During squid spawning season, they also eat dead or dying squid.

Feeding habits can be altered due to climate shifts or anomalies. When the sea surface temperature increased, Bat Rays in Baja California Sur, Mexico were found to consume more pelagic crabs and peanut worms as compared to their typical crabs and stomatopods. This was due to the increased presence of pelagic crabs in the area which was caused by the increase in water temperature.

== Conservation status ==
This species is currently listed as least concern by the IUCN Red List of Endangered Species. Bat rays are not actively regulated according to the Pacific Fishery Management Council. While there are some overarching restrictions on the type of gear that can be used, these rays still have to deal with predators. Predators of the bat ray include California sea lion, great white sharks and broadnose sevengill sharks. To keep themselves safe from predators, bat rays camouflage in the sand.

== Relationship with humans ==
While the bat ray, like other stingrays, has a venomous spine in its tail (near the base), it is not considered dangerous and uses the spine only when attacked or frightened. Humans can avoid these spines by shuffling their feet when traversing shallow sand.

Currently, the bat ray is fished commercially in Mexico but not the United States. Prehistorically, native tribes on the California coast (probably Ohlone), especially in the San Francisco Bay area, fished bat rays in large numbers, presumably for food.

Commercial growers have long believed bat rays (which inhabit the same estuarine areas favored for the industry) prey on oysters and trapped them in large numbers. In fact, crabs (which are prey of bat rays) are principally responsible for oyster loss. Bat rays are not considered endangered or threatened.

Bat rays are popular in marine parks, and visitors are often allowed to touch or stroke the ray, usually on the wing.

== Relationship with other animals ==
The holes that bat rays leave behind after digging with their snouts allow smaller fish to eat the organisms hidden in the sand that they otherwise would not be able to retrieve themselves. These holes can be as large as 4 meters long and 20 centimeters deep.

== Gallery ==
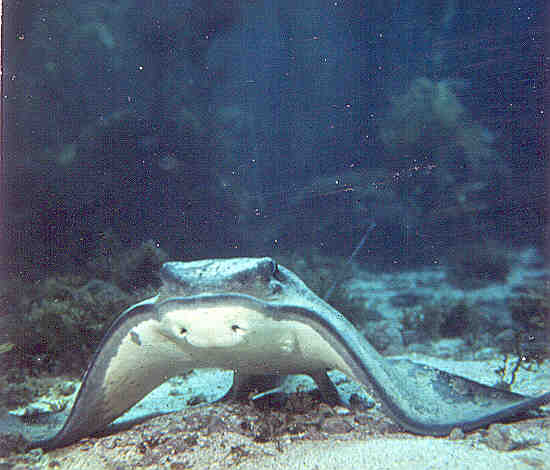
Bat ray adopting a feeding posture.

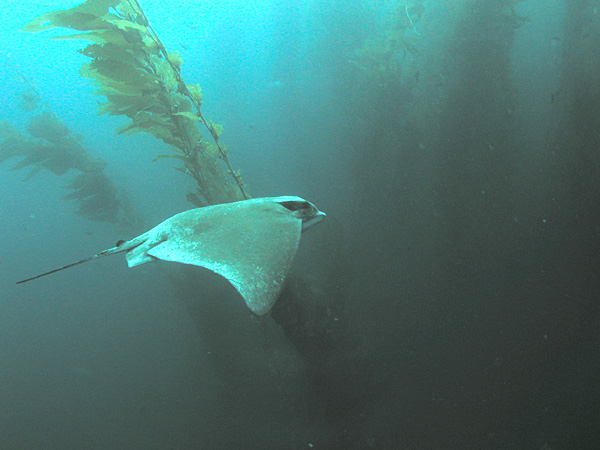
Bat ray in kelp forest, San Clemente Island.

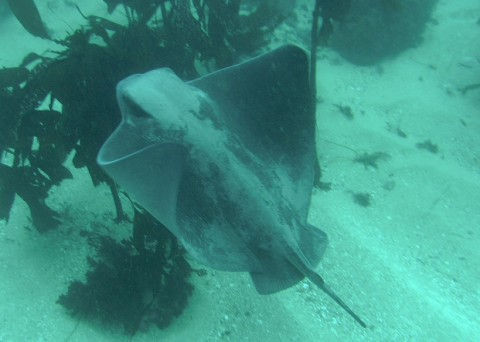
Bat ray off Pt. Lobos.

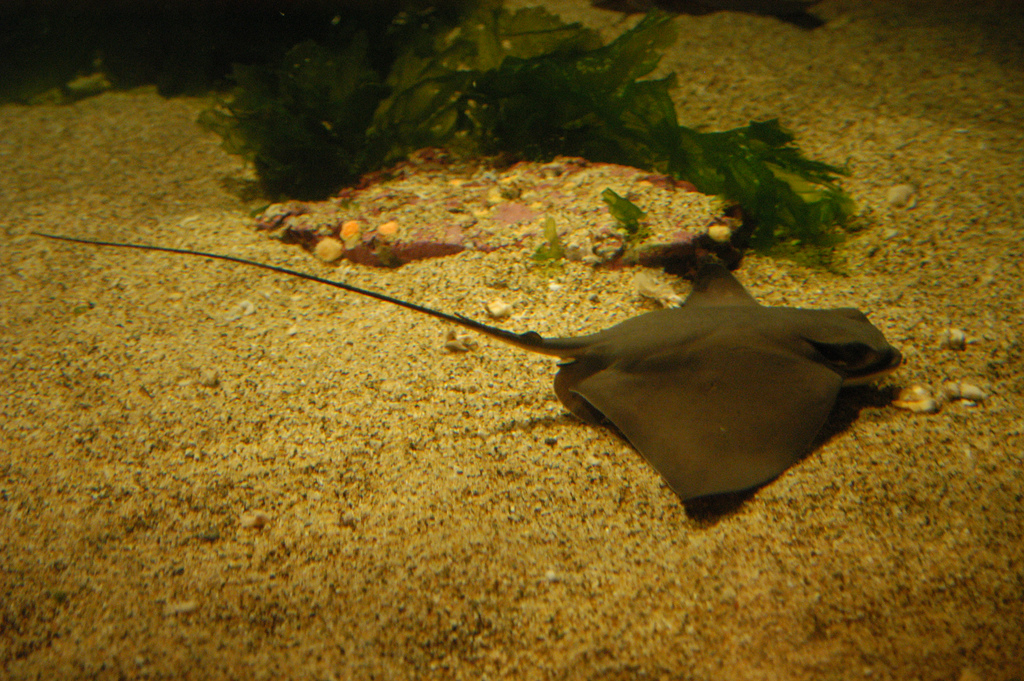
Bat ray at the Monterey Bay Aquarium.
