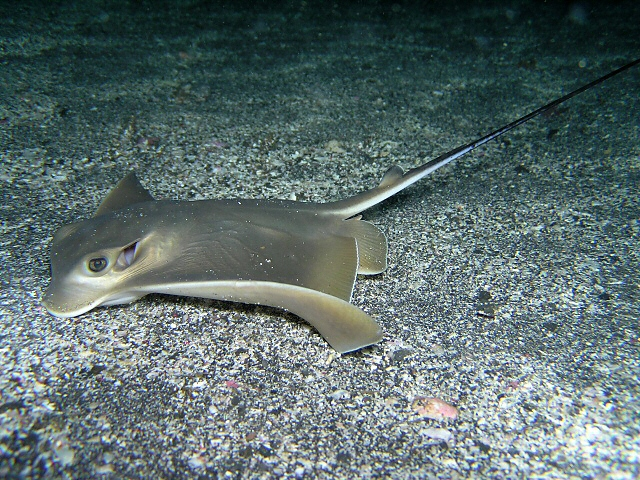
- Japanese eagle ray (Myliobatis tobijei)

Conservation status
- Vulnerable (IUCN 3.1)

Scientific classification
- Kingdom: Animalia
- Phylum: Chordata
- Class: Chondrichthyes
- Subclass: Elasmobranchii
- Order: Myliobatiformes
- Family: Myliobatidae
- Genus: Myliobatis
- Species: M. tobijei

Binomial name
- Myliobatis tobijei Bleeker, 1854

Synonyms
- Mobula tobijei; Myliobatis tobije

= Japanese eagle ray =

Species of cartilaginous fish

The Japanese eagle ray (Myliobatis tobijei), also known as the cowhead eagle ray or kite ray is a ray species in the family Myliobatidae.

== Description ==
The Japanese eagle ray grows to be up to 150 centimeters long and has a disc at least 114 centimeters wide. It is yellow-brown in color, and usually contains darker spots. It has rather long stinging spines, and its claspers are less than one-tenth the width of its disc. Each jaw of the species contains seven rows of teeth.

== Behavior ==
The Japanese eagle ray is demersal, usually inhabiting sea floors and feeding on benthic animals. In particular, it is known to eat crustaceans, fish, and sometimes benthic plants. Like all mylobatids, the species is ovoviviparous. Embryos initially feed on yolk. They later receive nourishment by indirectly absorbing uterine fluid from their mother. Little else is known about the biology of this species.

== Distribution, threats, and conservation ==
The Japanese eagle ray lives in the waters of East Asia, particularly in Japan, Korea, and China. It is also found in Indonesia and the Philippines. It is a tropical marine species, and lives in depths of over 220 meters.

The species is sometimes caught as a bycatch. It is also sometimes caught intentionally for its meat, as well as for its cartilage. Little else is known about its population and threats. There are currently no conservation measures taking place for this species, and it is listed as Vulnerable by IUCN.

== Parasites ==
The Japanese eagle ray is the host of the following parasitic species:

- Caulobothrium tobijei
- Raphidascaroides myliobatum
- Mawsonascaris myliobatum
