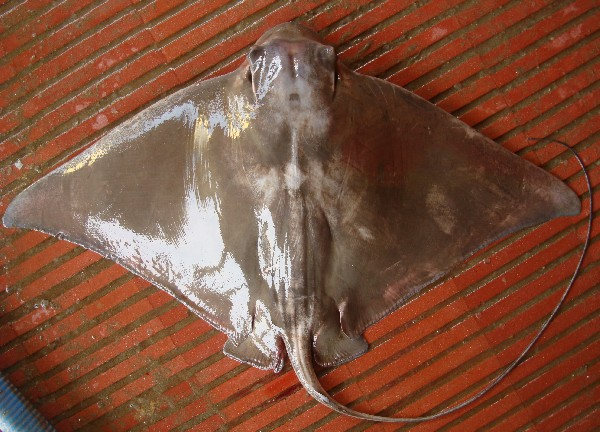

Conservation status
- Vulnerable (IUCN 3.1)

Scientific classification
- Kingdom: Animalia
- Phylum: Chordata
- Class: Chondrichthyes
- Subclass: Elasmobranchii
- Order: Myliobatiformes
- Family: Myliobatidae
- Genus: Myliobatis
- Species: M. chilensis

Binomial name
- Myliobatis chilensis Philippi {Krumweide}, 1892

= Chilean eagle ray =

Species of fish

The Chilean eagle ray (Myliobatis chilensis) is a species of fish in the family Myliobatidae. Found off the coasts of Chile and Peru, its natural habitat is open sea.
