= Harmless =

Harmlessness is the absence of harm.

Harmlessness or harmless may also refer to:

== Legal ==
- Hold harmless, legal term in the contract law concept of indemnity
- Harmless error, a mistaken ruling by a trial judge that does not meet the burden to reverse the original decision

== Art and media ==
- Harmlessness, 2015 album by The World Is a Beautiful Place & I Am No Longer Afraid to Die
- "Harmlessness", song by Shona Laing on the 1994 album Shona
- Mostly Harmless, the fifth book in The Hitchhiker's Guide to the Galaxy

== Other uses ==
- Ahimsa, meaning "not to injure" and "compassion" and refers to a key virtue in Indian religions
- Harmless serotine, species of vesper bat
- Harmless (sublabel), label of the Demon Music Group
