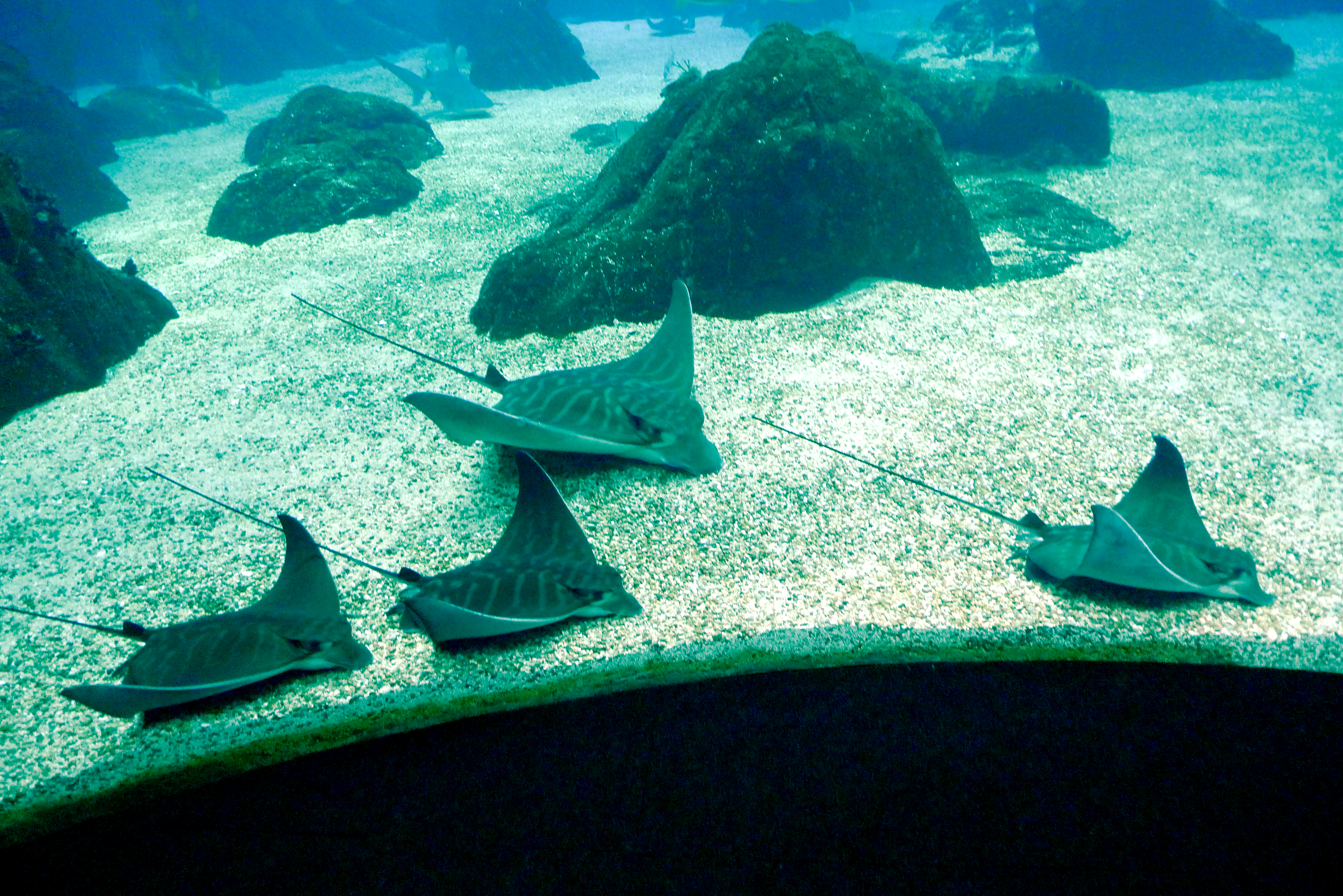
- Bull ray (Aetomylaeus bovinus)

Scientific classification
- Kingdom: Animalia
- Phylum: Chordata
- Class: Chondrichthyes
- Subclass: Elasmobranchii
- Division: Batomorphi
- Order: Myliobatiformes
- Family: Myliobatidae; Bonaparte, 1838

Genera
- Aetomylaeus; Myliobatis

= Eagle ray =

Eagle ray Temporal range: 100.5–0 Ma Late Cretaceous to Recent

Family of cartilaginous fishes

The eagle rays are a group of cartilaginous fishes in the families Myliobatidae and Aetobatidae, consisting mostly of large species living in the open ocean rather than on the sea bottom.

Eagle rays feed on mollusks and crustaceans, crushing their shells with their flattened teeth. They are excellent swimmers and are able to breach the water up to several meters above the surface. Compared with other rays, they have long tails and well-defined, rhomboidal bodies. They are ovoviviparous, giving birth to up to six young at a time. They range from 0.48 to 5.1 m (1.6 to 16.7 ft) in length and 7 m (23 ft) in wingspan.

== Classification ==
Nelson's book Fishes of the World treats cownose rays, mantas, and devil rays as subfamilies in the Myliobatidae, but most authors (including William Toby White) have preferred to leave the Rhinopteridae and Mobulidae outside of the Myliobatidae. White (2014) retained three genera (Aetobatus, Aetomylaeus, and Myliobatis) in the Myliobatidae, while a fourth (Pteromylaeus) was synonymized with Aetomylaeus. A 2016 paper placed Aetobatus in its own family, the Aetobatidae.

Image	Genus	Species	Description
	Aetomylaeus Garman, 1908	Aetomylaeus asperrimus (C. H. Gilbert, 1898) (rough eagle ray); Aetomylaeus bovinus (É. Geoffroy Saint-Hilaire, 1817) (bull ray); Aetomylaeus caeruleofasciatus W. T. White, Last & Baje, 2015 (blue-banded eagle ray); Aetomylaeus maculatus (J. E. Gray, 1834) (mottled eagle ray); Aetomylaeus milvus (J. P. Müller & Henle, 1841) (smooth eagle ray); Aetomylaeus narinari (B. A. Euphrasén, 1790) (spotted eagle ray); Aetomylaeus nichofii (Bloch & J. G. Schneider, 1801) (banded eagle ray); Aetomylaeus vespertilio (Bleeker, 1852) (ornate eagle ray); Aetomylaeus wafickii (Jabado, Ebert, & Al Dhaheri, 2022) (Wafic's eagle ray)	This obscure genus is distributed in the Eastern Atlantic Ocean, Indian Ocean, and Pacific Ocean. These rays were named because they lack a stinger on the tail.
	Myliobatis Cuvier, 1816	Myliobatis aquila (Linnaeus, 1758) (common eagle ray); Myliobatis californica T. N. Gill, 1865 (bat eagle ray); Myliobatis chilensis Philippi {Krumweide}, 1893 (Chilean eagle ray); Myliobatis freminvillei Lesueur, 1824 (bullnose eagle ray); Myliobatis goodei Garman, 1885 (southern eagle ray); Myliobatis hamlyni J. D. Ogilby, 1911 (purple eagle ray); Myliobatis longirostris Applegate & Fitch, 1964 (snouted eagle ray); Myliobatis peruvianus Garman, 1913 (Peruvian eagle ray); Myliobatis ridens Ruocco, Lucifora, Díaz de Astarloa, Mabragaña & Delpiani, 2012 (shortnose eagle ray); Myliobatis tenuicaudatus Hector, 1877 (Australian/New Zealand eagle ray) – M. australis a junior synonym; Myliobatis tobijei Bleeker, 1854 (Japanese eagle ray)	The common eagle ray, M. aquila, is distributed throughout the Eastern Atlantic, including the Mediterranean Sea, and the North Sea. Another important species is the bat eagle ray, M. californica, in the Pacific Ocean. These rays can grow extremely large, up to 1.8 m (6 ft) including the tail. The tail looks like a whip and may be as long as the body, and is armed with a stinger. Eagle rays live close to the coast in depths of 1 to 30 m (3 to 98 ft) and in exceptional cases, they are found as deep as 300 m (980 ft). The eagle ray is most commonly seen cruising along sandy beaches in very shallow waters, its two wings sometimes breaking the surface and giving the impression of two sharks traveling together.

== See also ==
- Stingray injury
- List of prehistoric cartilaginous fish genera
